= Dead mall =

Deteriorating or largely vacant shopping mall

Former Sears wing of the Century III Mall, located in West Mifflin, Pennsylvania. It was the world's third-largest shopping mall at the time of its opening, and would later become the world's largest abandoned mall before its demolition.

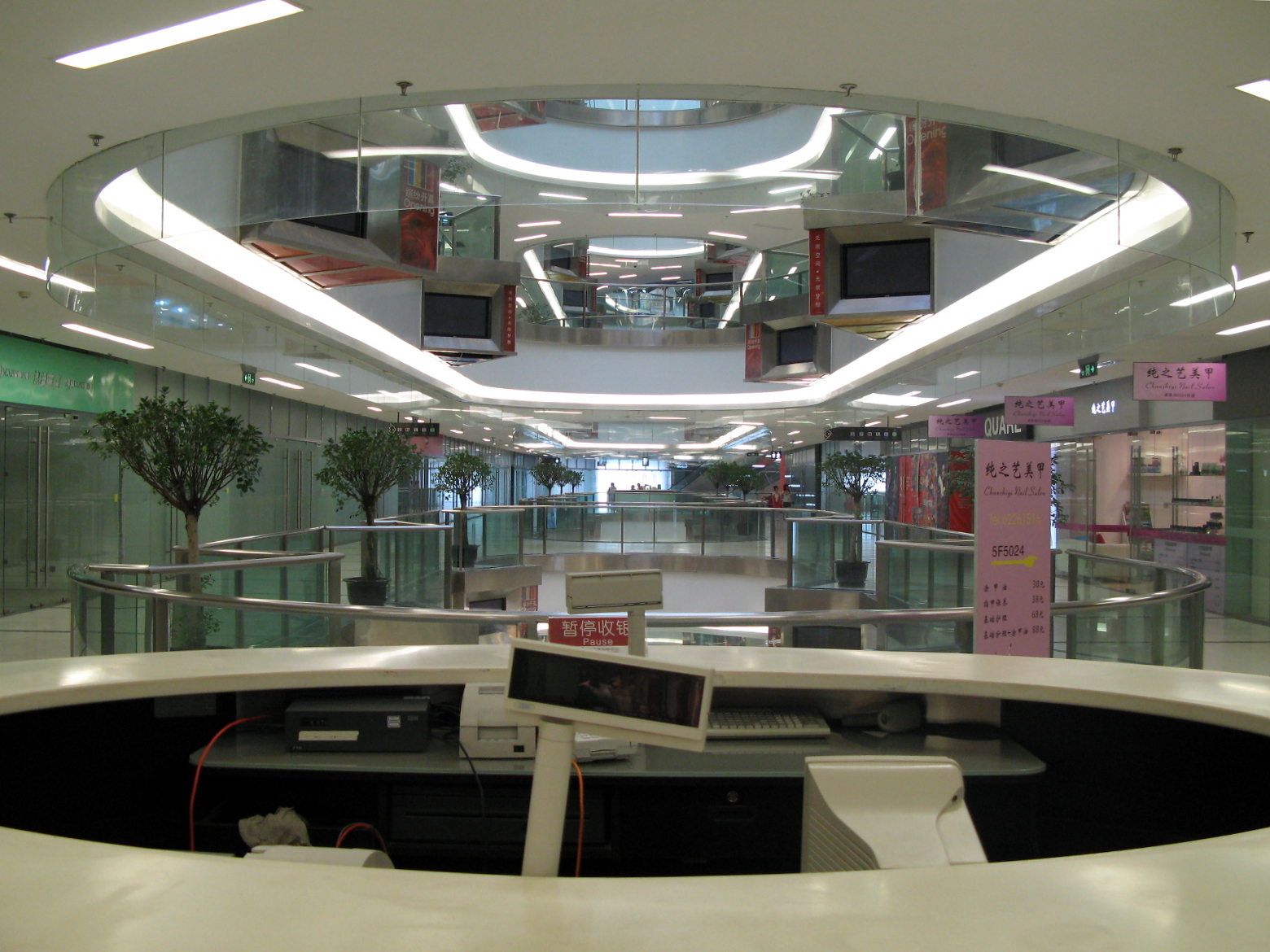
A "dead" wing of the Shanghai Summit Shopping City in Shanghai, China, in 2007

A dead mall, also known as a ghost mall or zombie mall, is a shopping mall that has low consumer traffic or is deteriorating in some manner.

Many malls in North America are considered "dead" when they have no surviving anchor store or successor that could attract people to the mall. Without the pedestrian traffic that department stores previously generated, sales volumes decline for almost all stores and rental revenues from those stores can no longer sustain the costly maintenance of the malls.

== Changes in the retail climate ==
Structural changes in the department-store industry have also made survival of these malls difficult. These changes have contributed to some areas or suburbs having insufficient traditional department stores to fill all the existing larger-lease-area anchor spaces. A few large national chains have replaced many local and regional chains, and some national chains are defunct.

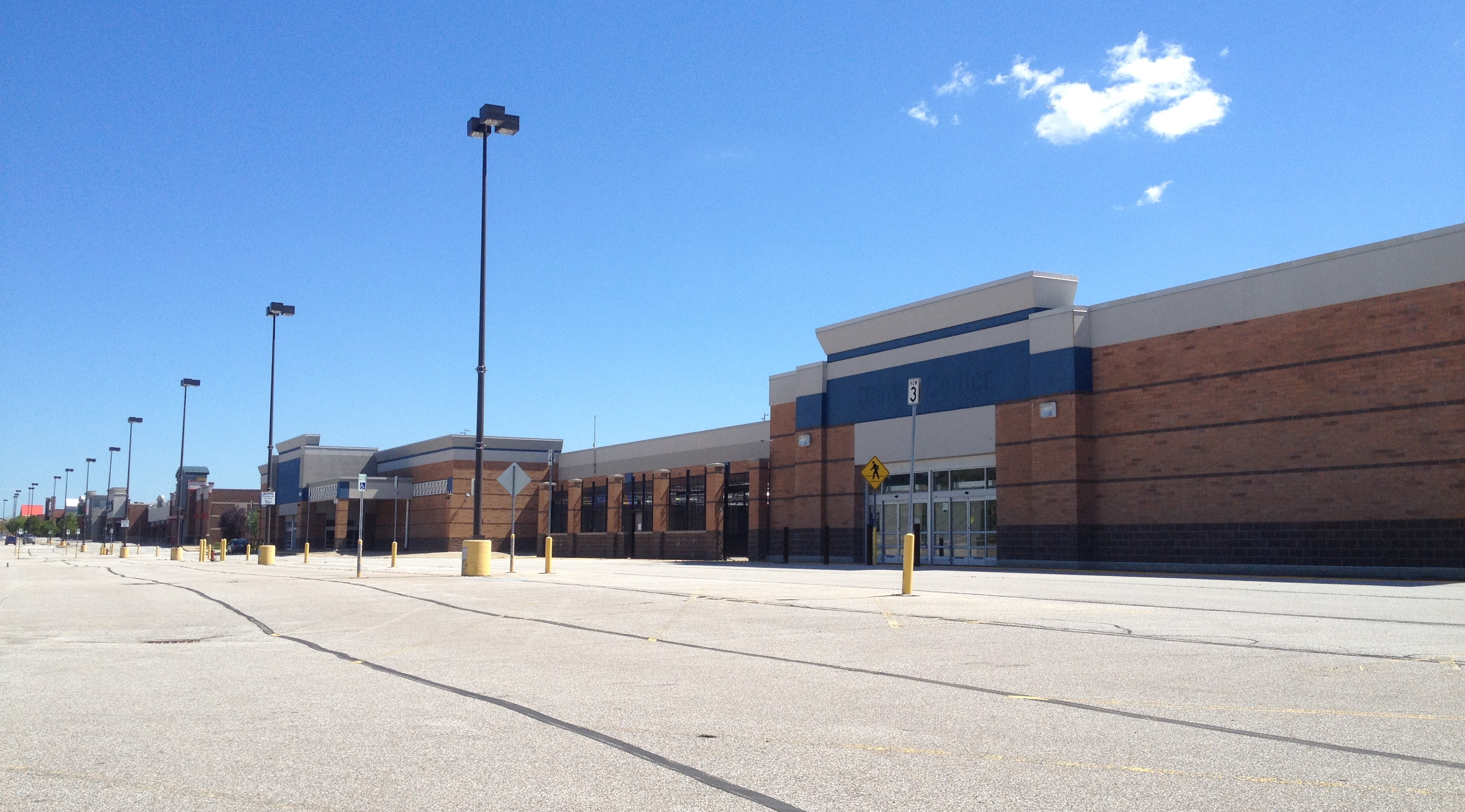
The City View Center is a dead plaza in Garfield Heights, Ohio.

In the U.S. and Canada, newer "big box" chains (also referred to as "category killers") such as Walmart, Target Corporation and Best Buy normally prefer purpose-built free-standing buildings rather than using mall-anchor spaces. Twenty-first-century retailing trends favor open air lifestyle centers; these centers resemble elements of power centers, big box stores, and strip malls; and (most disruptively for storefronts) online shopping over indoor malls. The massive change led Newsweek to declare the indoor mall format obsolete in 2008. The year 2007 marked the first time since the 1950s that no new malls were built in the United States. Most Canadian malls still remain indoors after renovations due to the harsh winter climate throughout most of the country; however, the Don Mills Centre was turned into an open-air shopping plaza. Attitudes about malls have also been changing. With changing priorities, people have less time to spend driving to and strolling through malls and, during the Great Recession, specialty stores offered what many shoppers saw as useless luxuries they could no longer afford. In this respect, big box stores and conventional strip malls have a time-saving advantage.

=== Demolition by neglect and failed redevelopment ===
Another cause for dead malls in the U.S. is "demolition by neglect" (DBN) which refers to allowing a mall to sit without any form of maintenance, redevelopment, or filling in vacant spaces until they are forced to sell the mall or if it no longer makes a profit, and such actions can not only lead to vacancies but also significant disrepair like failed HVAC, a non-functional fire sprinkler system, and broken escalators. In severe cases, DBN can justify demolition of a mall, making renovations no longer viable for it (and potentially prohibitively expensive).

Some developers, such as General Growth Properties and Simon Property Group, are accused of neglecting underperforming malls only to focus on "Class-A" premier malls. Support for this accusation surfaced in 2011, when GGP, recently emerging from bankruptcy, spun off 30 underperforming properties to a new company: Rouse Properties, which gets its name from The Rouse Company. The new company would not redevelop failing malls, and instead would let them sit until they can no longer make a profit, like Collin Creek Mall in Plano. Simon also spun off 44 underperforming properties in a new company: Washington Prime Group.

The most notable companies accused of DBN include Ashkenazy Acquisition Corporation for lack of maintenance and adequate security, Namdar Realty Group and Mason Asset Management for financial exploitation and letting properties deteriorate, Kohan Retail Investment Group for also allowing properties to deteriorate, and Moonbeam Capital Investments for cutting costs by disabling important safety components in their properties, such as HVAC, sometimes leading to fire suppression system failures. Notable cases of malls that have become dead or defunct due to DBN include Harborplace Festival Marketplace in Baltimore, Maryland, Marley Station Mall in Glen Burnie, Maryland, Burlington Center Mall in Burlington Township, New Jersey, and Faneuil Hall Marketplace in Boston, Massachusetts.

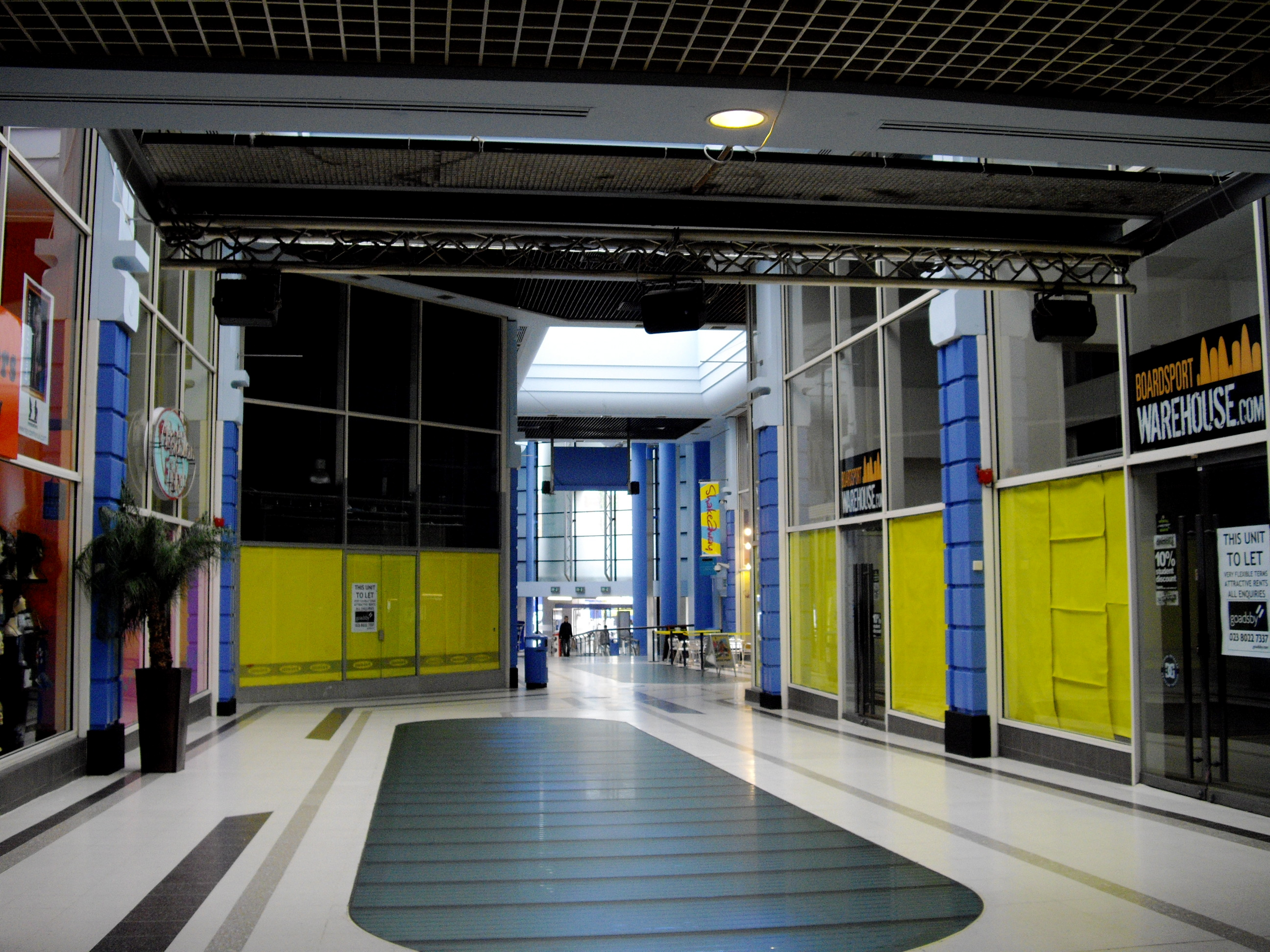
Between early 2013 and November 2017, the Bargate Centre in Southampton, England, was empty.

The number of dead malls has increased significantly because the economic health of malls across the United States has been in decline, with high vacancy rates in many of these malls. From 2006 to 2010, the percentage of malls that are considered to be "dying" by real estate experts (have a vacancy rate of at least 40%), unhealthy (20–40%), or in trouble (10-20%) all increased greatly, and these high vacancy rates only partially decreased from 2010 to 2014. In 2014, nearly 3% of all malls in the United States were considered to be "dying" (40% or higher vacancy rates) and nearly one-fifth of all malls had vacancy rates considered "troubling" (10% or higher).

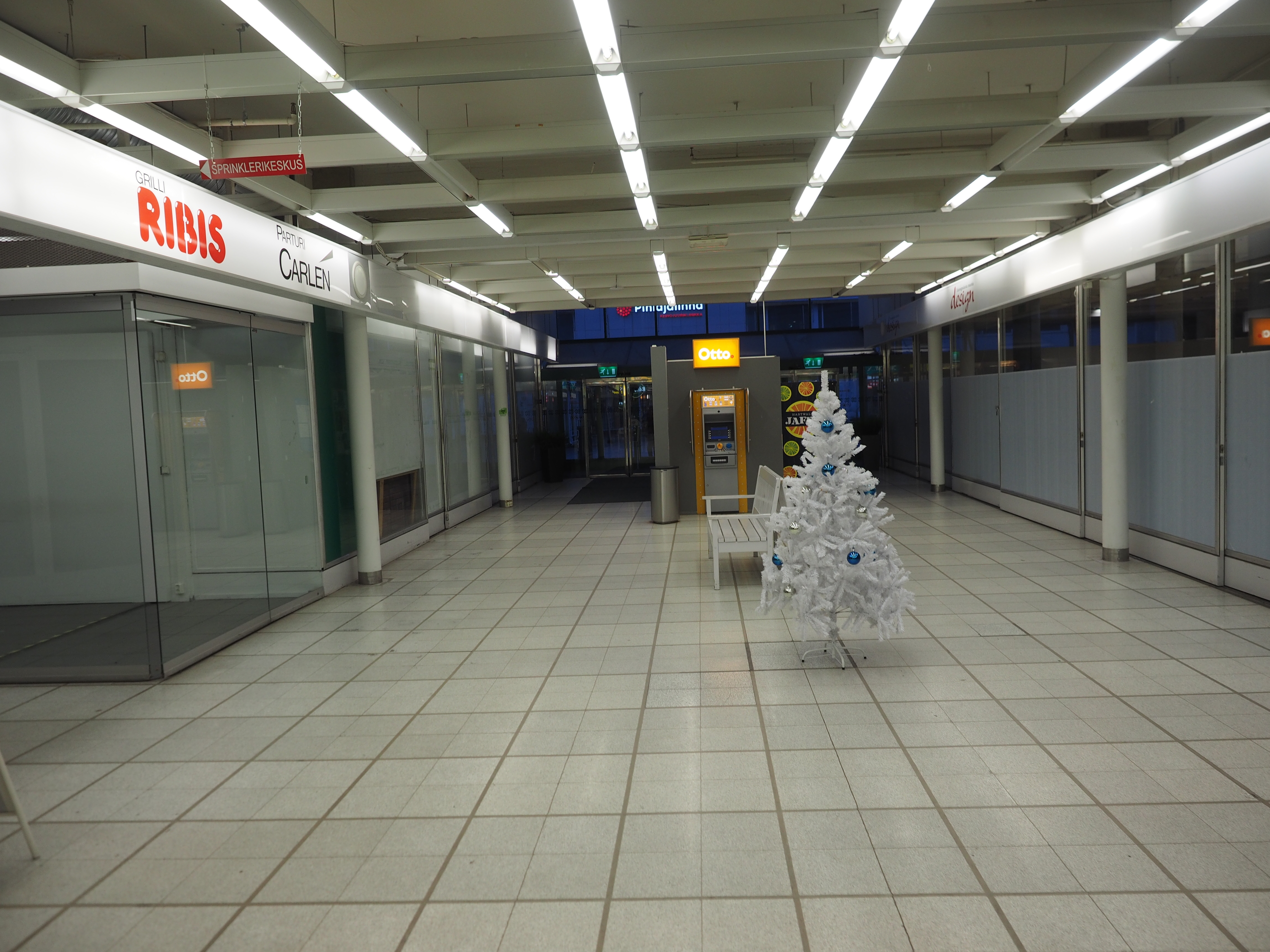
Heikintori, the first shopping mall in Finland, started to decline in the late 2010s.

Some real estate experts say the "fundamental problem" is a glut of malls in many parts of the country creating a market that is "extremely over-retailed". Cowen Research reported that the number of malls in the U.S. grew more than twice as fast as the population between 1970 and 2015; Cowen also reported that shopping center "gross leasable area" in the U.S. is 40 percent more shopping space per capita than Canada and five times more than the U.K.

Some malls have maintained profitability, particularly in areas with frequent inclement weather (or otherwise weather undesirable for outdoor activities, such as shopping in an open-air shopping/lifestyle center) or large populations of senior citizens who can partake in mall walking. Combined with lower rents, these factors have led to companies like Simon Malls enjoying high profits and occupancy averages of 92%. Some retailers have also begun to re-evaluate the mall environment, a positive sign for the industry.

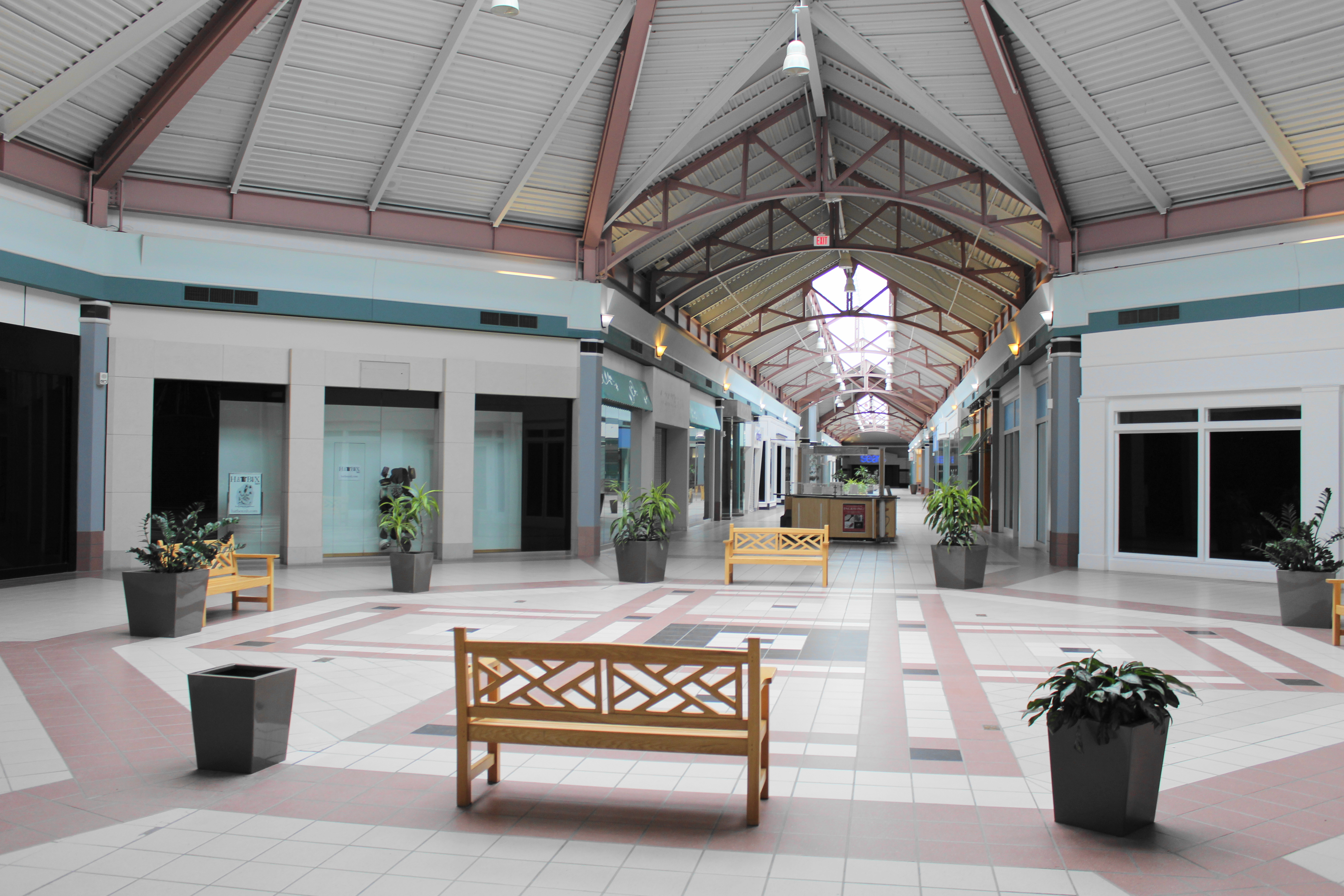
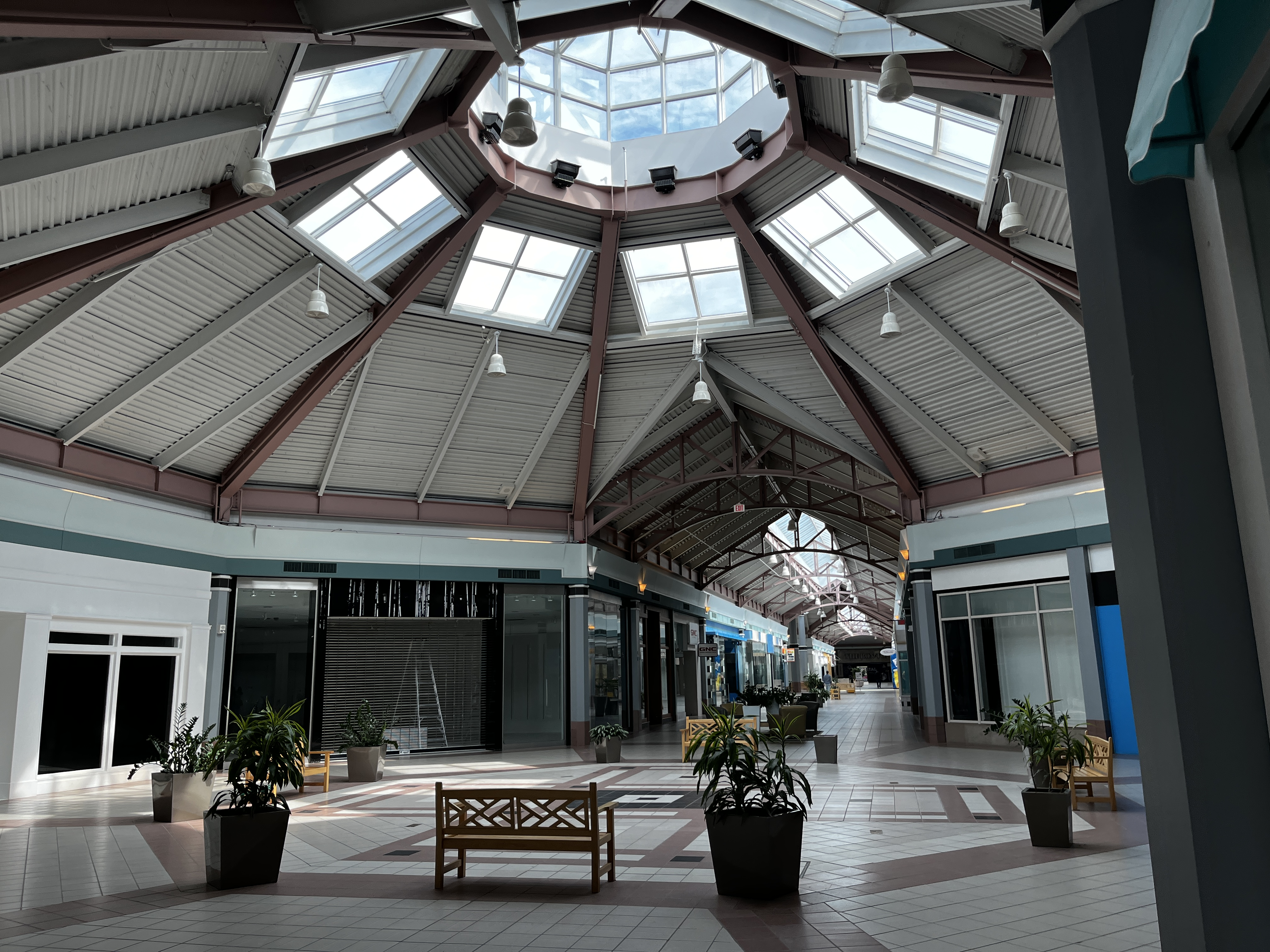
Steeplegate Mall in Concord, New Hampshire suffered a decline after peaking as the largest taxpayer in the city in 2010. These photos of its center atrium were taken six days before the mall interior closed in 2022. As of 2026, only three businesses, a JCPenney from opening day and two non-traditional occupants, still operate out of three of the mall's anchor spaces due to long-term leases.

A retail apocalypse that started in the 2010s made the dead mall situation even more noticeable. This is due to the complete closing of several retailers, as well as anchor tenants Macy's and JCPenney closing many locations and the sharp decline in Sears Holdings. The trend was particularly noticeable when Pittsburgh Mills, a mall once worth as much as $190 million, was sold at a foreclosure sale for $100, with the mall itself being purchased by lien holder Wells Fargo.

== Demographic change ==
It has been suggested that some malls die when the surrounding neighborhoods undergo a demographic change or socio-economic decline.

== COVID-19 pandemic ==
The COVID-19 pandemic exacerbated many issues affecting malls. During the COVID-19 pandemic, many malls closed temporarily due to stay-at-home orders. A number of notable retailers filed for bankruptcy during the pandemic including Ascena Retail Group, Brooks Brothers, GNC, JCPenney, Lord & Taylor, and Neiman Marcus.

North American malls that have permanently closed citing the pandemic as a precipitating factor include Northgate Mall in Durham, North Carolina, Cascade Mall in Burlington, Washington, and the Metrocenter in Phoenix, Arizona.

== Redevelopment ==
Dead malls are occasionally redeveloped. Leasing or management companies may change the architecture, layout, decor, or other component of a shopping center to attract more renters and draw more profits. Several dead malls have been significantly renovated into open-air shopping centers.

Redevelopment can involve a switch from retail usage to office or educational use for a building, such as in the case with Eastgate Metroplex in Tulsa, Oklahoma, Park Central Mall in Phoenix, Eastmont Town Center in Oakland, California, Windsor Park Mall in San Antonio (which became the global headquarters of Rackspace Technology), Global Mall at the Crossings in Nashville, Tennessee, and the Coral Springs Mall in Florida. Allegheny Center Mall, a retail mall just north of downtown Pittsburgh, Pennsylvania, closed as a retail mall in the early 1990s. The mall was redeveloped into office space with much of the space taken by telecommunications carriers, data center operators, and Internet service providers, and became a major carrier hotel serving southwestern Pennsylvania. Another use for a former mall occurred in Lexington, Kentucky, where Lexington Mall was partially demolished and converted into a satellite worship center for a local megachurch.

Conversion from a shopping mall into an open-air, mixed-use area may entail the demolition of parts of or all of the former shopping mall. An example of this came from Fairfax County, Virginia, where the former Springfield Mall was converted into Springfield Town Center, a mixed-use development that includes a twelve-screen movie theatre, shops, and restaurants with outdoor seating and entrances. When the structures are demolished completely, it is known as a greyfield site. In jurisdictions such as Vermont (with a strict permitting process) or in major urban areas (where open fields are long gone), this greyfielding can be much easier and cheaper than building on a greenfield site. An example of this type of redevelopment is Prestonwood Town Center in Dallas and Voorhees Town Center in Voorhees Township, New Jersey. Also, in Boardman, Ohio, the Southern Park Mall demolished the former Sears building to construct DeBartolo Commons, named after Edward J. DeBartolo Sr founder of the Edward J. DeBartolo Corporation.

Amazon, FedEx, DHL, UPS and the United States Postal Service have acquired the sites of some former malls and converted them to fulfillment centers. A proposal called "Re-Habit" uses portions of struggling malls, particularly vacated big box space, for homeless housing. As an example of this concept, the vacant Macy's in the Landmark Mall of Alexandria, Virginia, has been converted into a temporary homeless shelter for the Carpenter's Shelter.

Some major healthcare systems such as Vanderbilt Health and the University of Rochester (UR) Health have converted several dying malls into new "health malls" or "mall to medicine". The large spaces allow for the easy conversion of space-intensive activities such as ambulatory surgical centers, while the multiple storefronts facilitate "one stop shopping" for all of health related needs. Roughly half of 100 Oaks Mall in Nashville, Tennessee, became part of Vanderbilt University Medical Center. Following the model, it is expanding to other dead or dying malls throughout its region, while University of Rochester Medical Center has converted roughly one-third of The Marketplace Mall in Henrietta, New York.

== See also ==
- Dan Bell – creator of Dead Mall documentary series
- Bright Sun Films – creator of Abandoned, Bankrupt, and Cancelled documentary series
- Jasper Mall – 2020 American documentary film
- Liminal space (aesthetic)
- Deadmalls.com
- Modern ruins
- Demolition by neglect
- Mixed-use development
