= Midland Commons =

- Coordinates: 41.7199°N 71.4811°W
- Address: 650 Bald Hill Road, Warwick, Rhode Island, US
- Opened: October 1967; 59 years ago
- Closed: April 30, 2011; 15 years ago (mall interior)
- Developer: Homart Development Company
- Owner: Eastern Development
- Num. of anchor tenants: 7 (was 2 from 1967-1997 and 3 from 1997-2016)
- Floor area: 579,499 square feet (53,837 m^{2})
- Floors: 2

Midland Commons (formerly Midland Mall from 1965–1985 and Rhode Island Mall from 1985–2011) is an outdoor power center in Warwick, Rhode Island. It previously existed as a two-story, enclosed shopping mall. The property opened as the Midland Mall in October 1967; for several years, it co-existed with the nearby Warwick Mall that opened in 1970. The mall was renamed the Rhode Island Mall in March 1985, and experienced rapid decline as tenants relocated to the Warwick Mall in the 1990s. It was considered a dead mall by the 2000s, and the interior of the mall was closed permanently in April 2011. The property was sold in 2012 and has been under redevelopment into its current configuration as a power center since 2016.

The mall was originally anchored by Sears and Shepard's. The latter eventually became G. Fox, and later Filene's, before being divided into Kohl's and Walmart. The former was converted into At Home and Raymour & Flanigan. The interior of the mall was turned into Burlington, Dick's Sporting Goods, and Planet Fitness.

== Operations as shopping mall ==
The land on which the mall sits was pasture land when Homart Development Company (the mall building subsidiary of Sears) purchased it in 1963. To accommodate the mall, a hill was leveled and the course of the Pawtuxet River was altered. The Midland Mall opened October 2, 1967, included 60 shops, and anchors Sears and Providence based Shepard's department store. Homart sold the mall to MetLife in 1981 for $20 million. It was officially renamed the "Rhode Island Mall" in March 1985.

In 1988, May Department Stores acquired Boston-based department store chain Filene's. May merged its previously owned G. Fox division into Filene's in 1993, and converted all of its stores, including the Rhode Island Mall location, to the Filene's name. Filene's closed their Rhode Island Mall location four years later, in favor of the existing store at Warwick Mall. After the closure of Filene's, nearly one-third of the mall (including both the former Filene's and the Food Court) was demolished for a two-level anchor, featuring Kohl's on one level and Walmart on the other. Neither the Kohl's nor the Wal-Mart had interior entrances in the mall. The walled-off anchor spaces and Food Court removal were detrimental to the health of the interior mall. Vacancy rates climbed as interior foot traffic decreased. The one driver of foot traffic in the mall was a Rhode Island Department of Motor Vehicles (DMV) express location. As a cost-cutting measure, RI DMV closed the branch on August 7, 2010.

Many of the mall's vacant spaces were leased by Royal Ahold, owners of the Stop & Shop supermarket franchise. Maintaining vacant retail space was a tactic by Royal Ahold to block Wal-Mart from opening a superstore concept with a full grocery department in the mall.

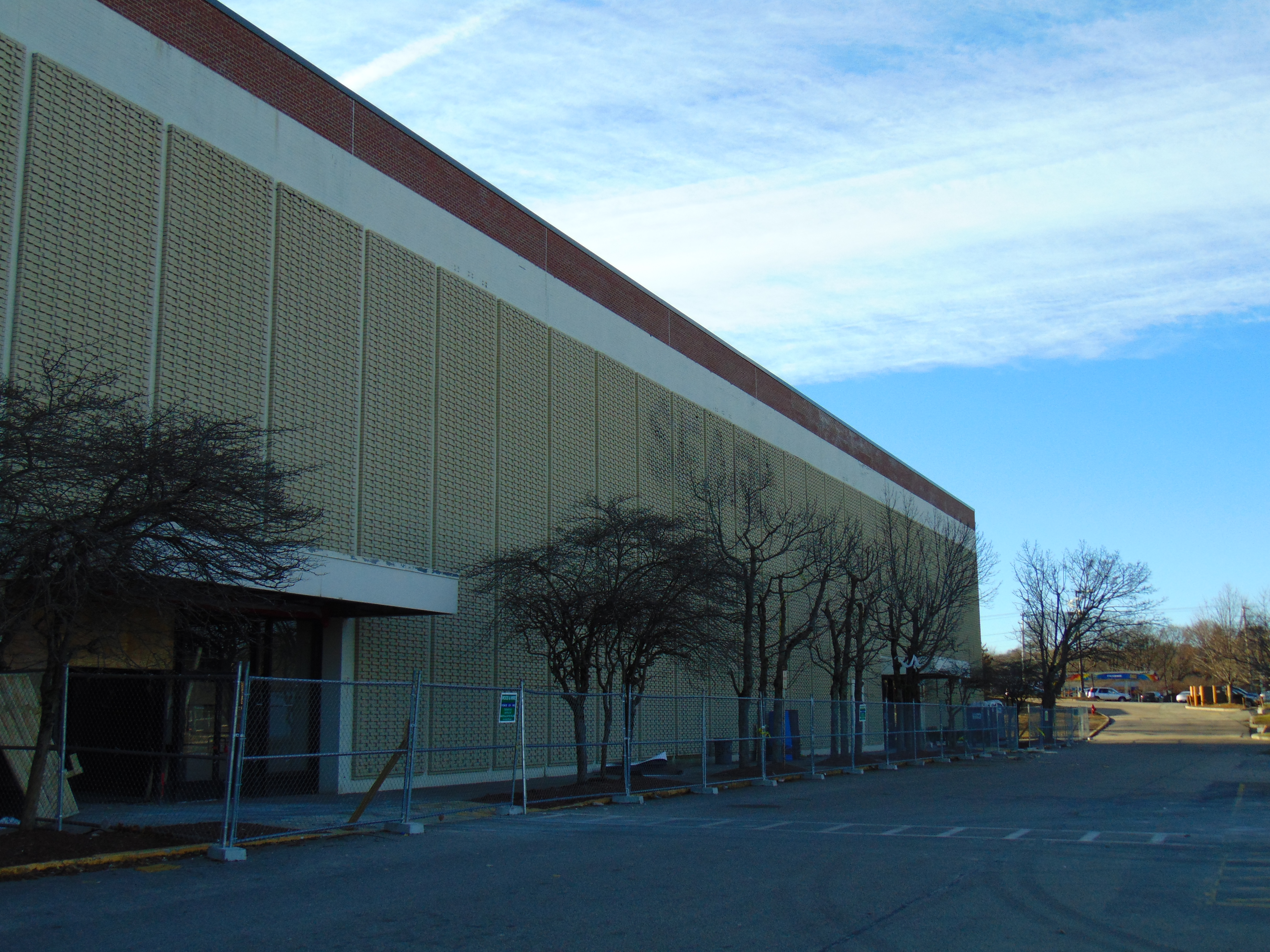
The closed Sears in the Rhode Island Mall. (January 2018) This location closed in September 2017.

=== 2011 closure ===
Rhode Island Mall was a dead mall, and has been listed on Deadmalls.com. Its anchors are Kohl's, Walmart, and Sears. Sears was the last anchor to open into the mall interior, but began leaving their gates down permanently in early 2011, finally closing access off via a partition wall in March 2011.

Rhode Island Mall also has five detached buildings in the parking lot occupied by Toys "R" Us (closed in 2018), Wendy's, Chuck E. Cheese, On the Border Mexican Grill & Cantina and Sears Automotive. Sears Automotive closed in 2015. Despite the lack of storefronts in the mall, the fountain in the center of the mall, as well as the elevator and escalators, continued to operate on a daily basis. The mall also continued to staff a maintenance and custodian crew as well as a 24-hour security detail provided by IPC International Security. In April 2011 mall management closed access to the mall's interior. The only three stores still open in the interior of the mall by the time it closed were First Place Sports, a local sporting goods store, LensCrafters and GNC.

== Operations as power center ==
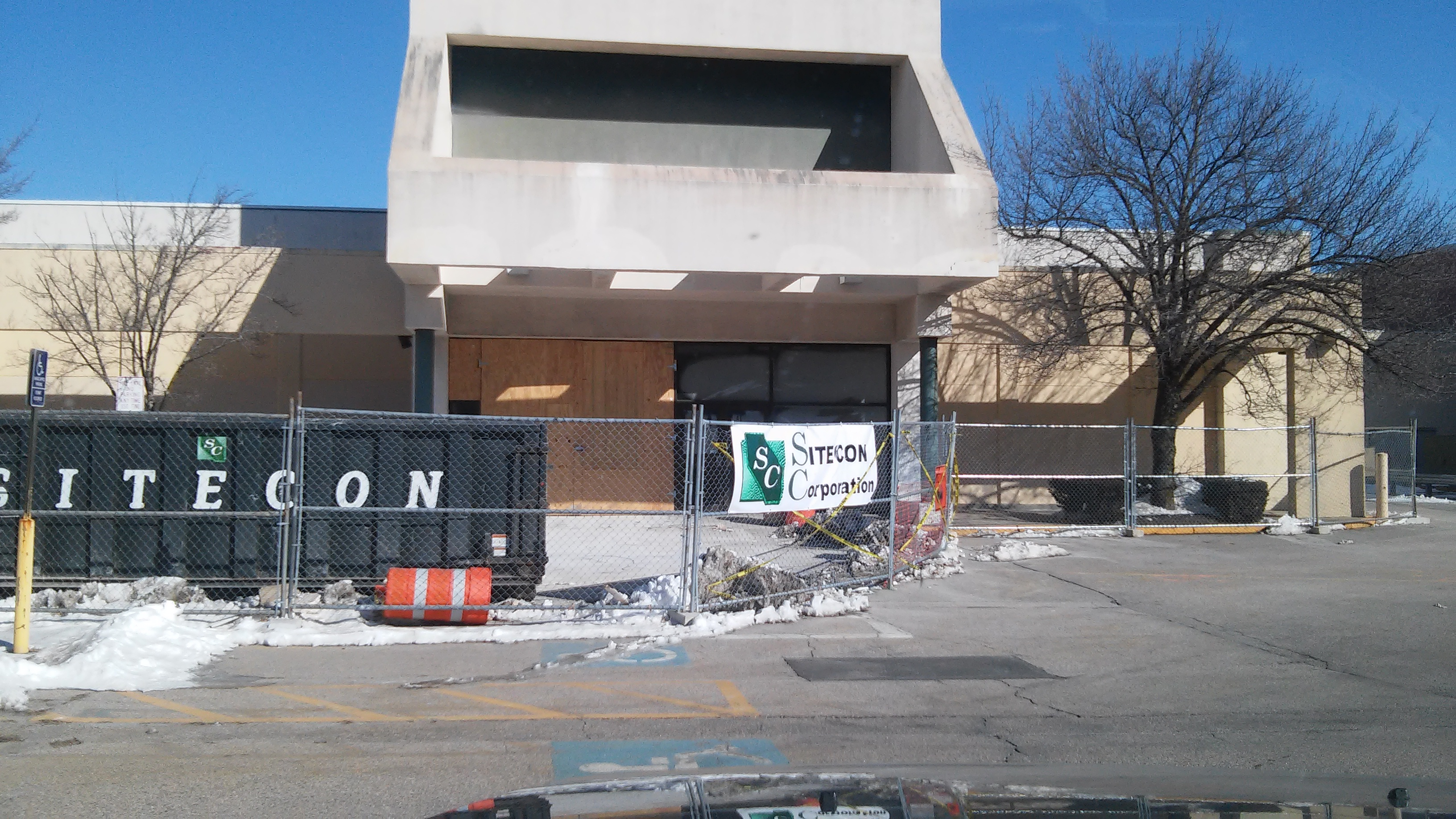
The mall undergoing redevelopment in February 2016.

On November 14, 2012, Winstanley Enterprises, LLC. of Concord, MA and Surrey Equities, LLC. of New York, NY announced they had purchased the mall for $38 million. A formal statement released by Adam Winstanley, a Principal of Winstanley Enterprises said, "There is a rich history with this property, and we are very excited to breathe new life into the development by putting together a plan that will once again position the mall as a vibrant part of Warwick's retail hub."

A plan was announced in late 2014 to redevelop the mall as an outlet center, while retaining Kohl's, Walmart, and Sears.

In 2015, Sears Holdings spun off 235 of its properties, including the Sears at Rhode Island Mall, into Seritage Growth Properties.

As of February 2016 the mall has undergone construction to create space for four "big box" style tenants instead of the original outlet style plan. Burlington Coat Factory has been confirmed as one of the leasees. Construction was slated to be finished by September 2016, although the remaining three rental spaces have yet to be filled.

It was announced that Dick's Sporting Goods and Planet Fitness will be relocating to the mall from their original locations. BJ's Brewhouse announced that they would be opening their first Rhode Island (and New England) location there as well.

In September 2017, Sears closed its store as it was one of 20 stores to close nationwide.

It was announced in October 2017 that Raymour & Flanigan will be relocating to the mall from its original location, taking over the first floor of the former Sears. At Home will also relocate from its original location to the mall, taking over the second floor of the former Sears, due to a lawsuit they had with Home Depot, which is in the same plaza as the original At Home location. Portions of the former Sears Auto Center are now BJ's Restaurants and Hook & Reel. Wendy's, On the Border, and Chuck E. Cheese are also outparcels on the Seritage site.

In July 2018, Toys R Us closed as a result of the company's Chapter 11 bankruptcy filing. BJ's Market took over the building in May 2022 and is still operating as of June 2024.
