= Windsor Park Mall =

Former shopping mall in San Antonio, Texas

- Location: Windcrest, Texas, (Note: The former mall was located in San Antonio from 1976 to 2007; the property was transferred to Windcrest as part of the redevelopment) United States
- Coordinates: 29.5076°N 98.3939°W
- Address: 5000 Walzem Road
- Opened: July 29, 1976
- Closed: August 31, 2005
- Developer: Melvin Simon and Associates (as mall); Rackspace (as office); Industrial Commercial Properties (as business park)
- Architect: Gordon Sibeck and Associates
- Num. of stores: 135
- Num. of anchor tenants: 5
- Floor area: 1,200,000 square feet (110,000 m^{2})
- Floors: 2

Windsor Park Mall was a shopping mall located on the northeast side of San Antonio, Texas, off Interstate 35 and Walzem Road. It was opened by Melvin Simon and Associates in 1976 as San Antonio's first four-anchor shopping center, adding a fifth anchor space in 1985. After Simon opened Rolling Oaks Mall in 1988 and the mall experienced a series of crime incidents in the 1990s, it declined. All of its anchors closed between 2001 and 2005, with the mall itself closing along with Mervyn's in 2005.

In 2007, the building, of which ownership was transferred to the suburb of Windcrest, Texas, became the new corporate headquarters of Rackspace, a Web hosting company. Their redevelopment of the mall structure, now known as "The Castle", sparked a redevelopment of the surrounding area. Rackspace remained in the area through 2022, when it announced its intention to vacate the property, which was underutilized due to increased remote work. In early 2024, the building was sold to Industrial Commercial Properties LLC, becoming known as the Windcrest International Business Park.

== History ==
=== 1976–2007: Windsor Park Mall ===
Melvin Simon and Associates announced their development plans for the mall in January 1974, with Montgomery Ward, JCPenney, and Dillard's announced as anchor tenants. A fourth anchor was provided for in the mall plan, which was announced as Joske's in June. The mall's construction followed the growth of residential construction in northeast San Antonio; Simon touted the center as the largest enclosed mall in the market and the only one with four major anchors. Windsor Park Mall and Dillard's and Joske's opened to the public on July 29, 1976; its other anchor stores opened at various other times (Montgomery Ward in October 1975, JCPenney in June 1976). In addition to the anchors, it housed 115 stores and services, among them a five-screen United Artists movie theater. In 1979, Simon opened Ingram Park Mall, which like Windsor Park was designed by Gordon Sibeck and Associates of Dallas and had a similar appearance.

In 1984, construction began on an expansion to the mall to add Mervyn's, building its first San Antonio store. In 1987, Dillard's bought Joske's. It opted to return space in the Joske's stores at Windsor Park and Ingram Park to Simon for the construction of food courts, retaining a level to operate as a home store. The upper level was turned into a food court with space for twelve restaurants as well as additional retail space at a cost of $8 million ($22.7 million in 2025 dollars). Simon opened Rolling Oaks Mall, 10 minutes away and also in northeast San Antonio, in July 1988; in conjunction with the new mall, Simon renovated Windsor Park between 1987 and November 1990. The second phase of renovations eliminated an outdated interior and gave the mall a Southwestern theme, adding skylights, octagon-shaped stage, marble floors, and new fountains. At this time, Windsor Park had 135 tenants and an occupancy rate of 97 or 94 percent.

In the 1990s, crime rose at Windsor Park Mall. In February 1991, a 20-year-old man was stabbed with a knife and killed at the mall's VIA Metropolitan Transit park and ride. In January 1992, a teenager trying to shoot a rival gang member instead killed a 64-year-old woman when she came between the two at the mall's bus stop. The incidents resulted in Simon terminating the leases of the VIA transit facilities at Windsor Park and its other San Antonio malls. In September 1994, a drive-by shooting in September damaged windows on the exterior of Montgomery Ward, and that December an altercation inside the mall disrupted holiday shoppers when two teenagers got into an argument that escalated into gunshots; the victim died of his injuries. In 1995, the Bexar County Sheriff's Department announced it was opening an annex at the mall. The crime and resulting safety concerns damaged the mall's reputation and began to take their toll on the success of Windsor Park, and by 2001, Simon considered using the mall as an incubator for small businesses. In addition, retail traffic shifted from the Walzem Road area and Windsor Park to The Forum at Olympia Parkway, a lifestyle center.

The national closure in 2001 of one of the more successful anchors of the mall, Wards, marked the beginning of the end of Windsor Park's life as a shopping mall. Dillard's closed in January 2002, a year in which mall occupancy dipped to 45 percent and the mall was sold by Simon to Whichard Real Estate of North Carolina. Government agencies, social organizations, churches, a nightclub, and a "bazaar" flea market were tenants in the mall's dying days; meanwhile, Whichard entertained the idea of converting Windsor Park to an outlet mall, commissioning Bruce Targoff, formerly of the Mills Corporation, to present a redevelopment plan. JCPenney closed in 2004 in favor of opening at Rolling Oaks, and Mervyn's, the last anchor, shut its doors on August 31, 2005, as part of that chain's closure of 62 stores, heralding the mall's closure.

In 2004, Bayview Loan Services served a notice of foreclosure to Whichard. The vacant Montgomery Ward, then owned by Graham Weston, the chairman and co-founder of Rackspace, was used in 2005 to shelter 3,300 victims of Hurricane Katrina and some 3,000 refugees of Hurricane Rita.

=== 2007–2024: Rackspace ownership ===
Rackspace was rapidly outgrowing its newly leased corporate headquarters, which were in a building formerly used by Datapoint on the northwest side of San Antonio; seeking even more space, Rackspace bought the mall for $27 million in 2007. As part of its acquisition of Windsor Park, the city boundaries of San Antonio were modified to place 221 acres (89 ha) of land, including the former mall, into the suburb of Windcrest; that city had lost $100,000 in taxes each year since the mall's closure in 2005. Rackspace hired architect and urban planner Andrés Duany and renovated the former mall (now known as "The Castle") for more than $100 million, having received a $22 million grant from the state of Texas. Renovations also added environmentally friendly features such as a rainwater cistern and dual flush toilets; in 2009, The Castle received LEED Gold certification. By 2012, 3,200 employees worked at the former mall site. The redevelopment of Windsor Park has attracted retail and multi-family residential development geared to the higher incomes of Rackspace employees (on average $69,000 a year, compared to $37,000 a year, the local average), and Rackspace developed a neighborhood park around the site.

Among the features of The Castle were a two-story slide, 80 conference rooms, cable car-type gondolas repurposed from the closed Sky Ride at Brackenridge Park, a coffee shop and fitness center and art installations. The Castle also integrates the neon Food Court sign from the mall that was added in the 1987 renovations. As of 2013, 525,000 square feet (48,800 m^{2}) of the 1,200,000 square feet (110,000 m^{2}) former mall has been renovated. In addition, in one of the escalator wells, there is a word search that held the Guinness World Record for world's largest word search at the time of its creation. The perimeter road around the center, which was added by Rackspace on a new route, was known as Fanatical Place (in reference to the company's value of "Fanatical Support"); another access road was named Racker Road, after the nickname for Rackspace employees.

=== 2024–present: Windcrest International Business Park ===
The shift to remote working induced by the COVID-19 pandemic reduced Rackspace's need for office space. In 2022, Windcrest mayor Dan Reese was given a tour by Rackspace; he told San Antonio Report that "there were, in essence, 20 people in the building". Shortly after, the company opted to relocate to smaller headquarters. Rackspace paid a $9 million lease termination fee, which the North East Independent School District contended was owed half under the 2007 agreement that brought Rackspace to the site, but the city of San Antonio claimed it was the sole beneficiary of that amount.

In early 2024, the building was sold to Industrial Commercial Properties LLC, becoming known as the Windcrest International Business Park. The firm, which had experience in converting malls and office campuses, received a tax exemption as part of a sale deal with the city of Windcrest and Bexar County.
