= Aptum Technologies =

Managed services provider

- Type: Subsidiary
- Industry: Cloud Computing, Hosting
- Founded: 1996
- Headquarters: Toronto, Ontario, Canada
- Parent: Digital Colony Partners
- Website: aptum.com

Aptum Technologies, formerly Cogeco Peer 1, is a provider of services for data centers and cloud computing. The company is headquartered in Toronto, Ontario, Canada.

== History ==
Peer 1 Network Enterprises was founded in 1996 in Vancouver, British Columbia, and funded in 2003. In 2004, Peer 1 acquired ServerBeach for about US$7.5 million. ServerBeach was based in San Antonio, Texas, founded in January 2003 by Rackspace co-founder Richard Yoo. ServerBeach had hosted video site YouTube until December 2007. In 2005, Peer 1 acquired Interland, Inc. assets in the USA for about US$14 million, and an investment of US$ 36 million, led by Celerity Partners, of Menlo Park, California. By 2010 Peer 1 was doing business as Peer 1 Hosting, listed as a public company on the Toronto Stock Exchange with symbol PIX, reporting yearly revenues of about CDN$98 million. In 2012, Peer 1 acquired UK hosting provider NetBenefit for 25 million pounds, from Group NBT Limited.

Cogeco Cable purchased Peer 1 Hosting in December, 2012. It formed Cogeco Peer 1 specializing in managed hosting, dedicated servers, cloud services and colocation.

On February 27, 2019, Cogeco agreed to sell Cogeco Peer 1 Inc. to the investment firm Digital Colony. The deal closed on May 1, 2019.

In August 2019, Cogeco Peer 1 changed its name to Aptum Technologies. Susan Bowen was chief executive at the time.

The Canadian co-location business was sold to eStruxture in May 2021.

In June 2021, the parent of Digital Colony, Colony Capital, based in Boca Raton, Florida, announced it would rebrand itself to be called DigitalBridge.

In January 2023, Aptum acquired CloudOps, a Montreal-based cloud consulting, managed services and software company focused on open source, cloud native platforms, networking and DevOps.
