= Rackspace Technology =

American managed cloud computing company

Rackspace Technology, Inc.
- Type: Public
- Traded as: Nasdaq: RXT
- Industry: Cloud computing
- Founded: 1996; 30 years ago (as Cymitar Technology Group)
- Headquarters: San Antonio, Texas, US
- Key people: Gajen Kandiah (CEO)
- Services: Cloud computing
- Revenue: ▼US$2.69 billion (2025)
- Net income: ▲ −US$226 million (2025)
- Number of employees: c. 4,250 (2026)
- Website: rackspace.com

Rackspace Technology, Inc. is an American information technology cloud computing company based in San Antonio, Texas. It also has offices in Reston, Virginia, as well as in Australia, Canada, United Kingdom, India, Dubai, Switzerland, the Netherlands, Germany, Singapore, Mexico, Toronto and Hong Kong. Its data centers are located in Amsterdam (Netherlands), Virginia (US), Chicago (US), Dallas (US), London (UK), Frankfurt (Germany), Hong Kong (China), Kansas City (US), New York City (US), San Jose (US), Shanghai (China), Queenstown (Singapore) and Sydney (Australia).

== History ==
=== 1990s ===
Rackspace was founded in 1996 by Richard Yoo, Dirk Elmendorf and Patrick Condon. Two years later, Graham Weston and Morris Miller provided seed capital and began managing the company. The company began after Yoo dropped out of Trinity University and launched Cymitar Technology Group out of a garage, through which the company sold internet access to his former classmates. In 1998, the company was renamed Rackspace. That year, Weston became CEO.

=== 2000s ===
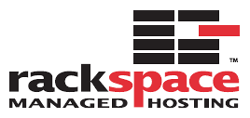
Pre-2008 logo

Lanham Napier entered the company in 2000 as its chief financial officer. In 2006, Yoo left Rackspace and Napier was named chief executive officer (CEO). Weston stepped down as CEO and that year, he was named chairman.

In 2008, Rackspace moved its headquarters to the then-unoccupied Windsor Park Mall in Windcrest, Texas. Rackspace's Chairman, Graham Weston, owned the Montgomery Ward building in the mall until 2006 when it was sold to a developer In 2005, following Hurricane Katrina, Rackspace employees volunteered to refurbish the Montgomery Ward into a shelter for 1,300 people.

The revitalization of the mall lead to development in the surrounding area, including the creation of Racker Road and the frontage road Fanatical Way, inspired by the company's trademark "Fanatical Support". "Fanatical support" was the company's motto to describe its customer service. This consisted of the disuse of voicemail, live customer support, and London-based customer service representatives always accessible, which at the time news reports attribute to giving Rackspace an "edge" in the web hosting industry. Later, Rackspace's Fanatical Support would be used to describe a service of providing customer representatives when businesses were implementing cloud hosting.

In 2008 Rackspace opened for trading on the New York Stock Exchange under the ticker symbol "RAX" after its initial public offering (IPO) in which it raised $187.5 million. The initial public offering included 15,000,000 shares of its common stock at a price of $12.50 per share. The IPO did not do well in the public market and lost about 20% of its initial price almost immediately.

At around 3:45 PM CST December 18, 2009, Rackspace experienced an outage for customers using its Dallas–Fort Worth data center – including those of Rackspace Cloud.

=== 2010s ===
In 2010, Rackspace announced it would discontinue hosting the website for Dove World Outreach Center after pastor Terry Jones said he planned to burn the Qur'an on the anniversary of 9/11. Jones called the move an "indirect attack on our freedom of speech." Business Insider also criticized Rackspace's decision.

In 2014, Napier stepped down as CEO and Weston was named the interim CEO. Taylor Rhodes was named president and later that year replaced Weston as CEO.

In August 2016, it was confirmed that the American private equity firm, Apollo Global Management, had reached an agreement to buy the company for $4.3 billion. The sale was completed in November 2016 and Rackspace officially ended trading on the New York Stock Exchange on November 3, 2016.

In May 2017, CEO Taylor Rhodes announced he was leaving the company, and was replaced by Joe Eazor. Eazor was replaced in 2019 by Kevin Jones.

=== 2020s ===
In June 2020 it changed its name to Rackspace Technology.

In August 2020 Rackspace Technology opened for trading on the Nasdaq under the ticker symbol "RXT" after its initial public offering (IPO). The Initial public offering of 33,500,000 shares of its common stock at an initial public offering price of $21.00 per share.

In September 2022 the company named Amar Maletira as its new CEO.

In December 2022 Rackspace suffered a major service outage which affected all its hosted Exchange users (customers who bought email services from Rackspace that involved instances of Microsoft Exchange hosted on Rackspace's servers). After initial investigation Rackspace declared the incident a 'security incident' and said it had powered down its servers to protect customer data which some commentators speculated might be indicative of a ransomware incident, a theory that was lent further credence by Rackspace's decision to recommend that customers migrate to Microsoft 365 rather than wait to have their Exchange-based solutions restored. On Monday December 5, 2022, the first full day of trading after the incident (which started on the previous Friday), Rackspace's shares were down as much as 16% ($0.75).

A class action lawsuit against Rackspace Technology, Inc. was filed on December 12, 2022, by Cole & Van Note for tens of thousands of businesses who lost access to their emails and services due to ransomware users. Stephenson, et al. v. Rackspace Technology, Inc. This class action was dismissed by the judge in San Antonio in May, 2023.

In June 2023, Rackspace launched Foundry for Generative AI by Rackspace (FAIR), a practice offering consulting and deployment services for generative AI.

In January 2024, Rackspace moved its San Antonio Global Headquarters from Windcrest (The Castle) to the RidgeWood Plaza II office building, located in north-central San Antonio.

Rackspace recorded large non-cash impairment charges in the mid-2020s as its market capitalisation fell: $681 million in 2022, $761 million in 2023, and a further $593 million in the first quarter of 2024 alone. The company reported a net loss of $863 million for 2024 on revenue of about $2.74 billion, with revenue declining in both of its business units. Revenue fell a further 2% in 2025, to $2.69 billion, while the net loss narrowed to $226 million.

In September 2025 the company named Gajen Kandiah as its new CEO, replacing Amar Maletira.

On June 10, 2026, the executive committee of Rackspace's board approved a workforce realignment plan cutting about 15% of the company's global staff, roughly 750 employees. The company said it expected one-time charges of $14–19 million in 2026 and annualised savings of $75–85 million, and described the cuts as a move away from certain legacy service-delivery functions, chiefly in its Public Cloud unit, in order to redeploy resources towards enterprise artificial intelligence services.

== Acquisitions ==
Rackspace's first acquisition was Webmail.us, an email hosting firm in Blacksburg, Virginia, bought in September 2007 and rebranded as Mailtrust. In October 2008 the company announced two purchases on the same day: Slicehost, a St. Louis provider of virtual private servers, and Jungle Disk, an online backup service. The pair were bought for a reported $11.5 million in cash and stock, with up to $16.5 million more contingent on performance, and were presented as a move to compete with Amazon Web Services.

Smaller purchases followed as Rackspace built out its cloud platform and its work on OpenStack. These included the server-monitoring company Cloudkick, the OpenStack development firm Anso Labs, the transactional email service Mailgun, the managed MongoDB provider ObjectRocket, Exceptional Cloud Services and ZeroVM. In February 2012 it also bought SharePoint911, a Microsoft SharePoint consultancy based in Cincinnati. and in September 2017 it announced the purchase of Datapipe, a Jersey City managed hosting company.

Later acquisitions were consultancies working on platforms other than Rackspace's own infrastructure: the Salesforce consultancy RelationEdge in September 2018, the AWS specialist Onica in November 2019, and Just Analytics, a Singapore-based cloud data, analytics and artificial intelligence firm, in January 2022.

=== Divestitures ===
Rackspace sold or spun off several of the businesses it had acquired as it refocused on managed cloud services. It sold ServerBeach, a low-cost dedicated-server brand it had launched in 2003, to Peer 1 Hosting in October 2004 for $7.5 million. Mailgun was spun out as an independent company in 2017 in a transaction led by the investment firm Turn/River Capital; Thoma Bravo acquired a majority stake in 2019, and the business was later bought by Sinch. Jungle Disk and Exceptional Cloud Services were also divested.

== Other business activities ==
Rackspace launched ServerBeach in San Antonio in January 2003 as a lower-cost alternative for dedicated servers designed for technology hobbyists who want flexibility and reliability. Richard Yoo was a catalyst in the startup of ServerBeach. It was sold to Peer 1 Hosting, now Cogeco Peer 1, in October 2004. Peer 1 Hosting entered the UK managed hosting market in January 2009 and the ServerBeach brand now competes directly with the UK arm of Rackspace, run by Dominic Monkhouse, former managing director of Rackspace Limited.

In October 2006, Mosso Inc. was launched, which experimented with white-labeling hosting services. Eventually, the division became the foundation for the Rackspace Cloud Computing offering.

The Webmail.us business was branded as Mailtrust and in May 2009 became part of a newly formed Cloud Office division.

On October 1, 2007, Rackspace acquired Webmail.us, a private e-mail hosting firm located in Blacksburg, VA. Originally branded as Mailtrust on May 20, 2009, it became part of the newly formed Cloud Office division of Rackspace.

On October 22, 2008, Rackspace acquired Slicehost, a provider of virtual servers and Jungle Disk, a provider of online backup software and services.

Rackspace announced on March 8, 2017, plans for an expansion to its portfolio to include managed service for the Google Cloud Platform. The program began beta testing on July 18, 2017, with a planned full offering in late 2017. Rackspace partnered with Google in Customer Reliability Engineering, a group of Google Site Reliability Engineers, to ensure cloud applications "run with the same speed and reliability as some of Google's most widely-used products".

== OpenStack ==
In 2010, Rackspace contributed the source code of its Cloud Files product to the OpenStack project under the Apache License to become the OpenStack Object Storage component.

In April 2012, Rackspace announced it would implement OpenStack Compute as the underlying technology for its Cloud Servers product. This change introduced a new control panel as well as add-on cloud services offering databases, server monitoring, block storage, and virtual networking. In 2015, two Rackspace executives were elected to the board of the OpenStack Foundation. In a February 2016 interview, CTO John Engates stated that Rackspace uses OpenStack to power its public and private cloud.

== Recognition ==
Fortune's "Top 100 Best Companies to Work For 2008" placed Rackspace as No. 32. In 2011 and 2013, the company was named as one of the top 100 places to work by Fortune.
