= Datapipe =

- Type: Subsidiary
- Industry: IT Services
- Founded: 1998
- Headquarters: Jersey City, New Jersey, United States
- Area served: Worldwide
- Parent: Rackspace
- Website: www.datapipe.com

Datapipe was a provider of managed hosting services and data centers for information technology services and cloud computing with data centers in Somerset, New Jersey, San Jose, California, the United Kingdom, and China. The company was founded in 1998 and is headquartered in Jersey City, New Jersey. Since 2011, more data centers have been added, including in Ashburn, Virginia, Moscow, and Singapore.

== History ==
In 1998, Robb Allen founded Datapipe with three employees. Originally based in Hoboken, NJ, the company started out providing both website design and hosting services. The company soundly weathered the dot.com bust, posting double digit growth every quarter. As the company grew, it focused on providing managed hosting services and began to expand its office space and data center facilities in the U.S., Europe, and Asia. Today the company claims to provide services to over 1000 clients, in industries including healthcare, pharmaceuticals, finance, SaaS, advertising, retail, media, and entertainment.

On September 11, 2017, Rackspace announced its intention to acquire Datapipe. The acquisition was completed on November 17, 2017.

== Services ==
Under the umbrella of Datapipe Managed Cloud, the company offers managed services for Amazon Web Services including Elastic Compute Cloud (EC2), CloudFront, S3, and Relational Database Service (RDS). Datapipe established partnerships with technology companies. Datapipe provides application management, hosting, professional services and security services for mid- to large-sized organizations. These services include monitoring, diagnostics, and problem resolution; enabling of software as a service to independent software vendors; custom application management, and remote infrastructure management.

The company is a member of the PCI Security Standards Council, a Microsoft Gold Certified Partner, and an EPA Green Power Partner. Datapipe’s San Jose and Somerset One Data Centers complete an annual SAS 70 Type II (Statement on Auditing Standards No. 70) Audit.

In August 2007, Datapipe announced that it opened offices in Shanghai, China. This followed the opening of its Hong Kong office in December 2005.

In September 2007, Datapipe relocated its corporate headquarters to 10 Exchange Place, Jersey City, NJ.

In July 2008, Datapipe announced that it received $75 million in combined credit and equity financing led by Goldman Sachs. The company said it plans to use the money to support future growth and data center expansions.

In October 2009, Datapipe added more data center capacity in central New Jersey.

In April 2010, Datapipe announced that their Somerset data center would run on 100 percent renewable electricity, by purchasing Green-e Energy certified Renewable Energy Certificates through Constellation NewEnergy’s NewMix Wind energy program. The company touts energy conservation measures and powers its London data center on alternative energy.

On November 17, 2010, Datapipe announced Datapipe Managed Cloud for Amazon Web Services. In 2015 Datapipe opened an additional office in Singapore to further address growing demand for multi-platform services in Asia.
