= Richard Yoo =

American businessman

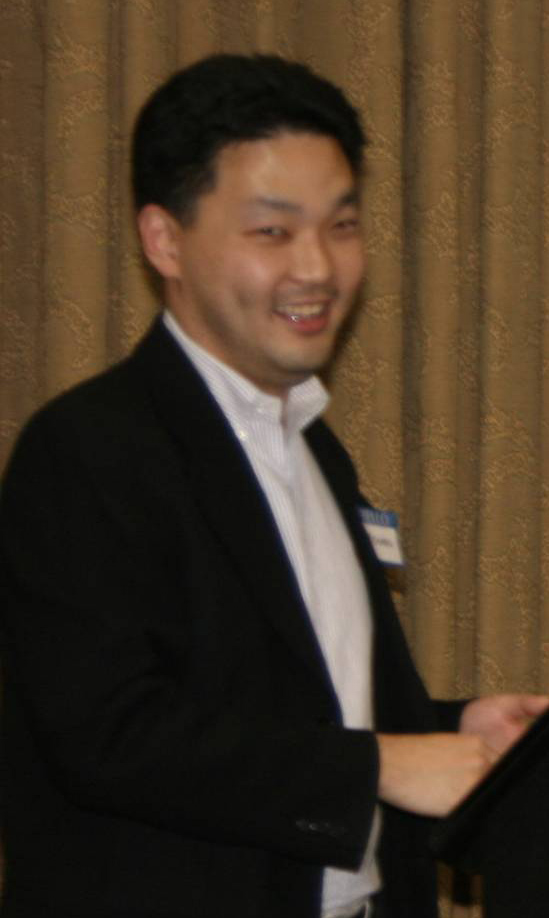
- Richard Yoo speaking at AIR Houston 2007 as chair
- Born: Houston, Texas, United States
- Occupation: Retired
- Website: www.richardyoo.com

Richard Yoo is an American entrepreneur, the co-founder and former CEO of the web hosting company Rackspace, and the founder and former CEO of web hosting company ServerBeach. Richard Yoo was born in Houston, Texas.

== Life ==
Born in Houston, Texas, Yoo graduated from Alief Hastings High School in Houston and attended Trinity University as a pre-med student in San Antonio, Texas. Although he did not graduate from Trinity, he operates as an advisor to the university's computer science department.

Cymitar Network Systems was Yoo's first start-up. The small Internet service provider was launched in 1996 and was run out of his garage apartment while attending college. Yoo co-founded Rackspace in 1998 and initially operated as its CEO.

In 2003, Yoo was recognized with San Antonio Business Journal’s Annual 40 Under 40 Award. The following year, he founded ServerBeach.

Yoo attended a TED conference in California in 2005.

Yoo is an advisor for Inventables in Chicago, Illinois and is a mentor for I/O Ventures in San Francisco, California. Additionally, he operates as a judge in the Rice University Business Plan Competition (RBPC), was a Chair for the Accessibility Internet Rally for Houston, and is an advisory board member of the Children's Museum of Houston.

Yoo spoke at the South by Southwest (SXSW) Conference.

Yoo invested in Perceptual Networks located in Philadelphia, Pennsylvania.
