= Warwick Mall =

Shopping mall in Warwick, Rhode Island, United States

Coordinates: 41°43′26.8″N 71°28′34.7″W

- Address: 400 Bald Hill Road, Suite 100; Warwick, Rhode Island, US 02886
- Opened: October 2, 1970
- Developer: Bliss Properties
- Owner: Warwick Mall LLC
- Num. of stores: 80+
- Num. of anchor tenants: 8
- Floor area: 1,000,000 square feet (93,000 m^{2})+
- Floors: 1 with partial upper level (2 in JCPenney, Jordan's Furniture, and Macy's)
- Website: warwickmall.com

Warwick Mall is an enclosed American shopping mall in Warwick, Rhode Island, on the north side of Interstate 295 near the junction with Interstate 95. Composed of more than 1,000,000 square feet (93,000 m^{2}) of retail space, it features more than 80 stores and a food court. The mall opened for business in 1970, with Boston-based Filene's and Jordan Marsh alongside Providence-based Peerless and The Outlet, and national chain Woolworth as initial anchors, JCPenney being later added as a sixth anchor.

Since then, all the anchor stores and the interior of the mall have changed as a result of business closings and consolidations. Today, the mall has seven main anchors: Macy's on the northern side, Old Navy and JCPenney on the western side, Jordan's Furniture and Nordstrom Rack on the eastern side, and Target, Off Broadway Shoes, and Golf Galaxy on the southern side. The mall also has a large food court, complete with a carousel, in the former Peerless anchor space.

The mall was largely flooded on March 30, 2010, during historic flooding of the nearby Pawtuxet River. The mall closed for five months after the flooding, with its "Preview" beginning in August and the Grand Reopening in October. The mall's final anchor, Macy's, reopened on March 16, 2011, and just over a month later, Jordan's Furniture announced on April 20, 2011, that it will open a new store in the vacated Old Navy and Caldor anchor space on the east side of the mall.

== History ==
=== Early years ===
Warwick Mall opened October 2, 1970, 3 years to the day after the nearby Midland Mall (later renamed Rhode Island Mall) opened. The mall opened with Filene's as its north anchor, and Jordan Marsh as its south anchor. Inline along the east side of the mall were anchors, from north to south, Providence-based Peerless and The Outlet, and national chain Woolworth.

By the early 1980s, the mall expanded and JCPenney opened as a sixth anchor along the west side of the mall. Caldor would replace The Outlet Company in 1982. This six-anchor arrangement began to negatively affect the mall, however, as it could only have 70 inline stores. Rhode Island Mall had gained an edge over Warwick Mall by the late 1980s, with its addition of a food court and more store space. In 1990, Peerless vacated its anchor spot.

=== 1990s ===
In 1991, the mall received a major renovation. Many of the vintage elements of the mall were removed; and today's arched ceilings and arches at the entrance were added, along with a new fire alarm system. The clock existing in the middle of the mall today is a remnant of the old design. The renovation also converted the vacant Peerless anchor space into a food court. These renovations positioned the mall over the Rhode Island Mall as the dominant mall in the area.

Rhode Island Mall received a major blow in 1992 after May Department Stores closed its G. Fox & Co. anchor, in favor of its Filene's at Warwick Mall, which it expanded. In 1996, the Jordan Marsh was rebranded as a Macy's by Federated Department Stores. Woolworth closed in 1997, and its anchor space was then leased by Limited Brands. The space was divided among a combined Express, Bath & Body Works, and Structure, which still have their own exterior entrance. Caldor went bankrupt in 1999, but Old Navy quickly filled the first level of the anchor spot, with the second floor remaining vacant. Also in 1999, the Providence Place Mall opened in nearby Providence; however, the mall saw very little impact from this.

=== 2000s ===
In the early 2000s, a Showcase Cinemas opened on one of the mall's outlots, joining several other outlet stores. In 2006, as a result of the Federated Department Stores buyout of May Department Stores, Macy's moved from the south anchor (former Jordan Marsh) space to the north anchor (former Filene's) space. As a result of Macy's move, the south anchor space was left vacant. By 2009, Target opened a store on the ground floor of the south anchor space, and Sports Authority opened in half of the second floor of the same space. The other half of the second floor and the third floor of the south anchor space remained vacant.

=== 2010s ===
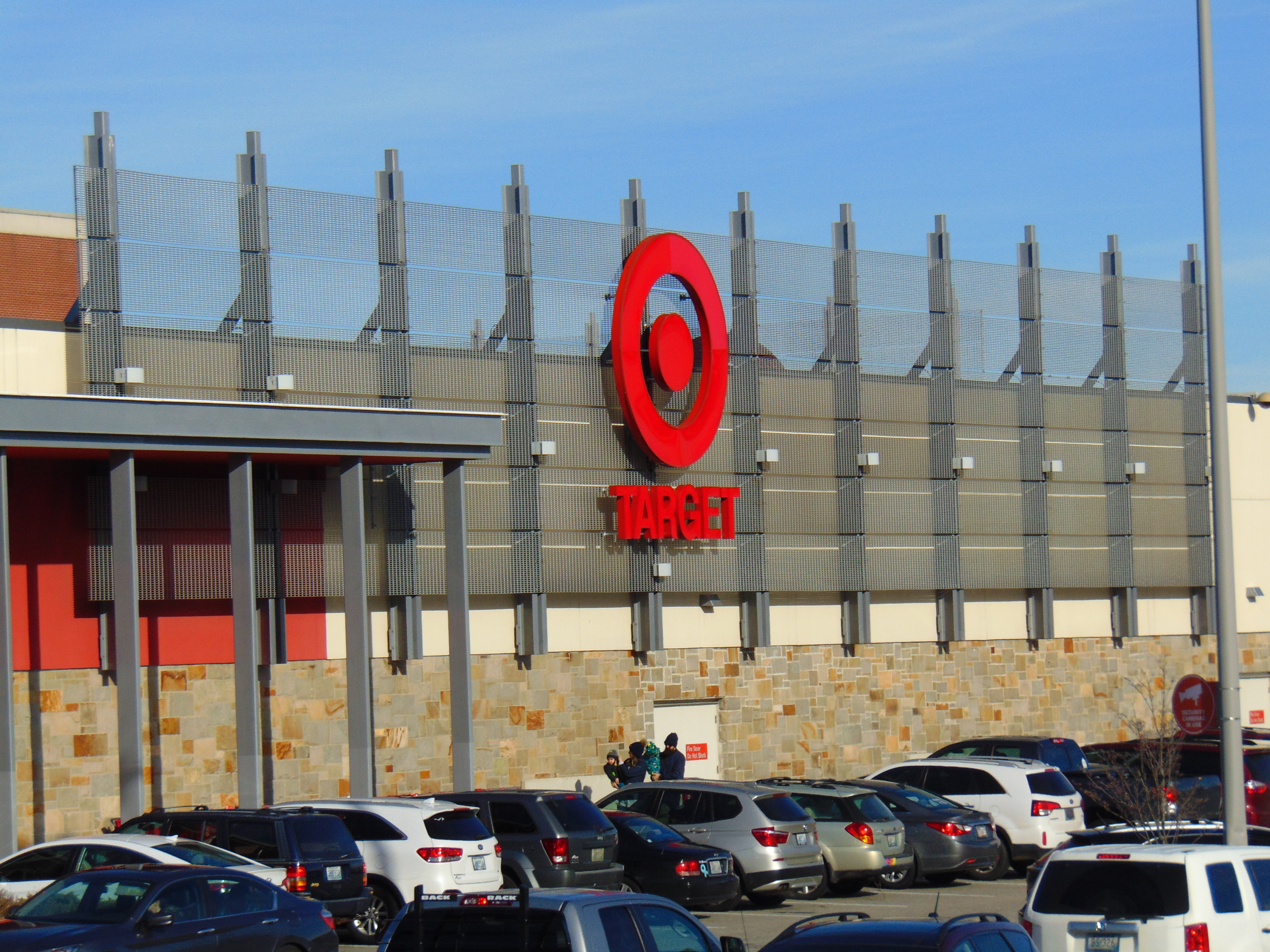
The Target located in the Warwick Mall.

On March 30, 2010, catastrophic flooding from the nearby Pawtuxet River left the Warwick Mall under several feet of water. A mall security guard had to be rescued by boat because of the rising waters. The mall received national TV attention, highlighting the extreme flooding in Rhode Island on that date. Six to ten inches (250 mm) of rain fell in the area on March 29–30 in addition to the 3+ inches of rain the area received a week earlier on the 23rd.

By April 3, 2010, the floodwaters had receded. Most stores had to be completely gutted and all inventory declared a loss.

The main portion of the mall had to be completely gutted up to four feet from the floor, due to water damage. The mall concourse received a new design, its first makeover since the 1991 renovation. New flooring was installed at the end of June, with porcelain tiles imported from Italy. Other changes in the mall decor include new topiaries and gardens within the mall concourse. The characteristic carousel was salvaged and restored, soft seating areas were added and a new flat screen television was purchased for the food court, along with the installation of new public washbasins.

The businesses on outparcels of the mall, Longhorn Steakhouse, Showcase Cinemas, and Firestone were able to reopen by the start of May 2010. Sports Authority, despite being located on the second level, above the flooded area, was unable to reopen until May 17, 2010, due to repair work required for the escalators and elevator. The first business to reopen on the ground level of the mall was Liberty Travel, which reopened on June 14, 2010. Target reopened on July 11, with the next opening being Old Navy. When the Warwick Mall reopened on August 20, 2010, 25 stores were in operation. Various other stores had reopening dates in September, October and November. The last anchor store, Macy's, reopened on March 16, 2011 (a "soft-opening" was held the previous Saturday, March 13). The reopening was nearly one year after the flood.

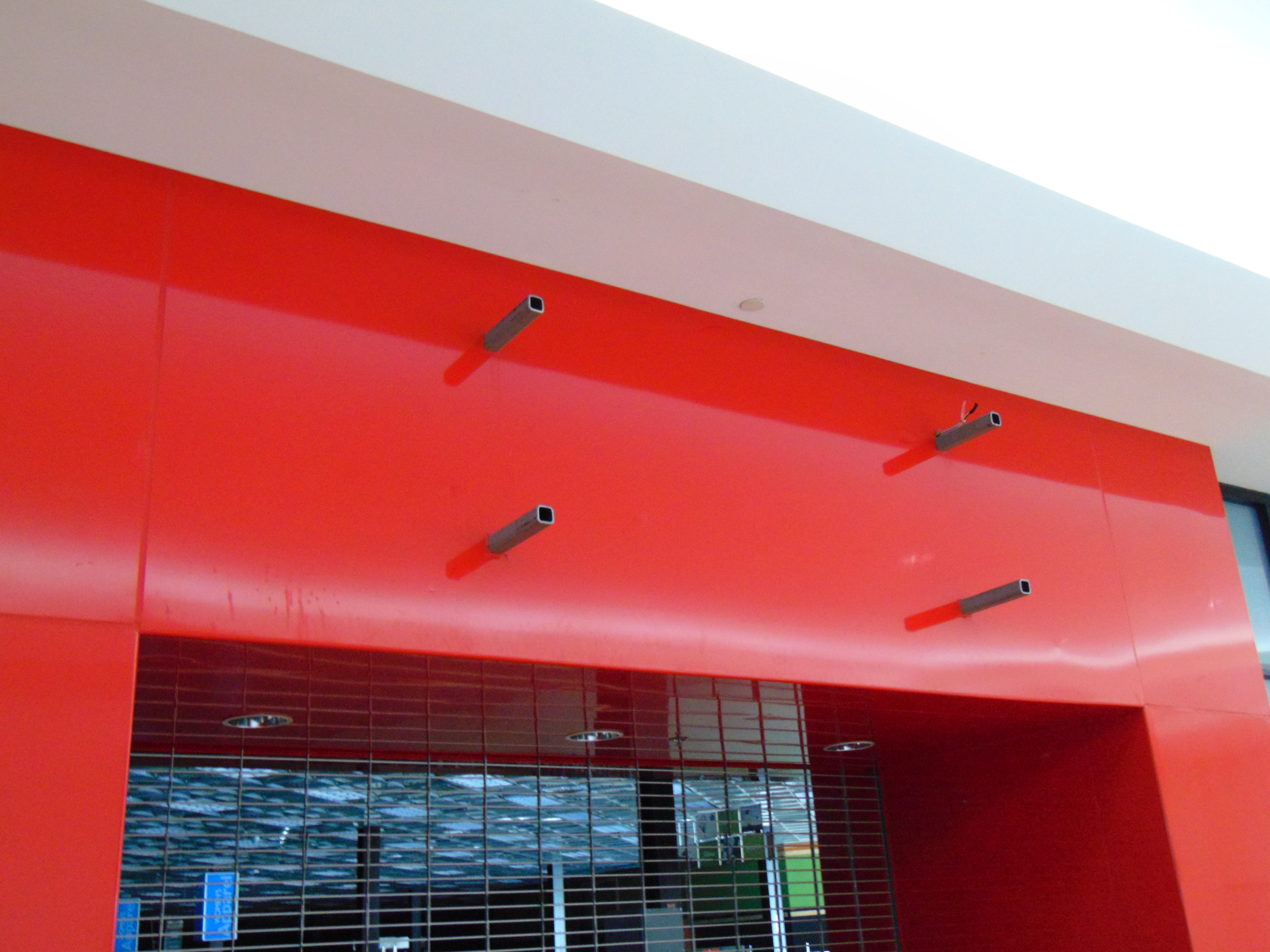
The vacant Sports Authority, which closed in July 2016.

On April 20, 2011, Jordan's Furniture of Taunton, Massachusetts announced plans to open a store in the former Old Navy and Caldor anchor space. Unlike the Old Navy store, Jordan's footprint utilizes both floors of the anchor space for its 100,000-square-foot (9,300 m^{2}) store, its first at a mall location. Jordan's Warwick Mall store opened on December 16, 2011. Two weeks later, Nordstrom Rack announced plans to open its first Rhode Island store at Warwick Mall in the Fall of 2012 as part of a newly developed wing. Nordstrom Rack opened November 8, 2012.

On July 28, 2016, Sports Authority closed their Warwick Mall location due to bankruptcy. In March 2020, Golf Galaxy opened their first Rhode Island store in the former Sports Authority space. The Showcase Cinemas closed in March 2021 as a result of the COVID-19 pandemic. The location was later purchased by Apple Cinemas, who held its grand opening on March 3, 2022. The location was described by the mall as the flagship location of Apple Cinemas. On April 16, 2025, a stabbing occurred in the parking lot of the theater, in which four teenagers slashed at two adults who had told them to be quiet during a movie.
