= City View Center =

Shopping mall in Garfield Heights, Ohio

Highland Park (Formerly City View Center)
- Location: Garfield Heights, OH
- Coordinates: 41.406541°N 81.614046°W
- Opened: August 2006
- Closed: 2021 (demolished the same year)
- Developer: John McGill
- Num. of stores: 7 (one open, six vacant, and two never finished)
- Website: www.icpllc.com/icp_portfolio/highland-park/

City View Center was a power center in Garfield Heights, Ohio, east of Cleveland. Positioned to be a regional shopping destination with stores such as Walmart, Giant Eagle, Dick's Sporting Goods and Bed Bath & Beyond, the development intended to increase Garfield Heights' commercial base soon developed into a modern dead mall, being built on landfill which soon liquified and caused damage to its buildings, along with fears of methane gas remaining unvented beneath the site which then caused multiple stores to close and abandon the center. A second phase that would have included The Home Depot, Panera, Chick-fil-A and Buffalo Wild Wings was never built, with those retailers fearing a redux of Phase I of the development. The shopping center underwent redevelopment, completing the process by 2021.

== History ==
=== Opening ===
The shopping center opened in 2006, after two years of construction. After the big-box stores opened, construction began outside the main plaza for additional restaurants and retail, such as RadioShack, Applebee's, Fatburger, Qdoba, Steak n Shake, Ruby Tuesday, and a FirstMerit branch.

=== Decline ===
The first store to close was Jo-Ann Fabrics on April 23, 2008. On September 15, 2008, Walmart announced the immediate closure and abandonment of their store due to structural concerns related to methane gas and settlement issues beneath its store site. Following Walmart's closure, PetSmart announced on October 2, 2008 that they would also close, as that chain specifically connects a number of its store locations to that of Home Depot, which never broke ground, violating PetSmart's leasing conditions.

Circuit City then followed with a closure of their store on December 31, 2008 as part of its nationwide liquidation. A "Bottom Dollar" dollar store opened in that space in late November 2009. In late 2009, Bed Bath And Beyond closed. On January 2, 2010, Dick's Sporting Goods shut down after nearly four years.

In March 2010, plans to convert the former Walmart into a convention center were floated; however, it was never regarded as a serious endeavor. Bottom Dollar departed on November 11, 2010, only lasting under a year at City View Center. In December 2010, the parent company of AJWright, TJX announced that they would rebrand that chain's stores to its other more well-known brands, HomeGoods, T.J. Maxx, or Marshalls, with the specific store becoming a Marshalls and closing two years later in 2013.

The second-to-last tenant, OfficeMax, announced on November 14, 2015 that they would be closing their store. FirstMerit closed in 2017 after the bank's acquisition by Huntington, which already had two nearby branches to the north and south on Turney Road (a Huntington ATM remains within the Giant Eagle). Steak 'n Shake closed their location in April 2019, though that was more related to the chain's overall struggles and decline due to its shifting business models and ownership. As of 2026, Giant Eagle is the only original remaining store in the Transportation Boulevard complex. Applebee's also remains open. A ribbon cutting ceremony was held at 9am on August 19 for Goodwill, which opened in the former PetSmart location in August 2022.

=== Reuse plans ===
As of February 2018, the vacant buildings on the site were under consideration as potential replacement facilities for Garfield Heights' police department, court, and jail. By May 2019, the then-owner of the site, City View LLC, had failed to repay an $81 million loan, leading to the placement of the site into receivership. In April 2020, Industrial Commercial Properties, LLC, acquired the mortgage on the property with plans to redevelop it into a business park. The redevelopment project was successfully completed in 2021. In 2026, Applebee’s closed permanently, leaving Giant Eagle as the sole original tenant.
