= ObjectRocket =

Cloud Database company based in USA

- Industry: Cloud database
- Founded: 2012
- Founders: Erik Beebe, Kenny Gorman, Chris Lalonde
- Headquarters: 100 Congress Avenue, Suite 400; Austin, Texas 78701
- Parent: Rackspace
- Website: www.objectrocket.com

ObjectRocket is a cloud database (DBaaS) company based in Austin, Texas, USA, specializing in NoSQL datastores including MongoDB, Elasticsearch, Redis. ObjectRocket has "designed and managed systems that power some of the busiest sites on the web, and played key founding development roles at companies like Shutterfly, PayPal, eBay and AOL". In 2013, it was acquired by Rackspace.
