= Steeplegate Mall =

Dead mall in Concord, New Hampshire, U.S.

Coordinates: 43.22258°N 71.48670°W

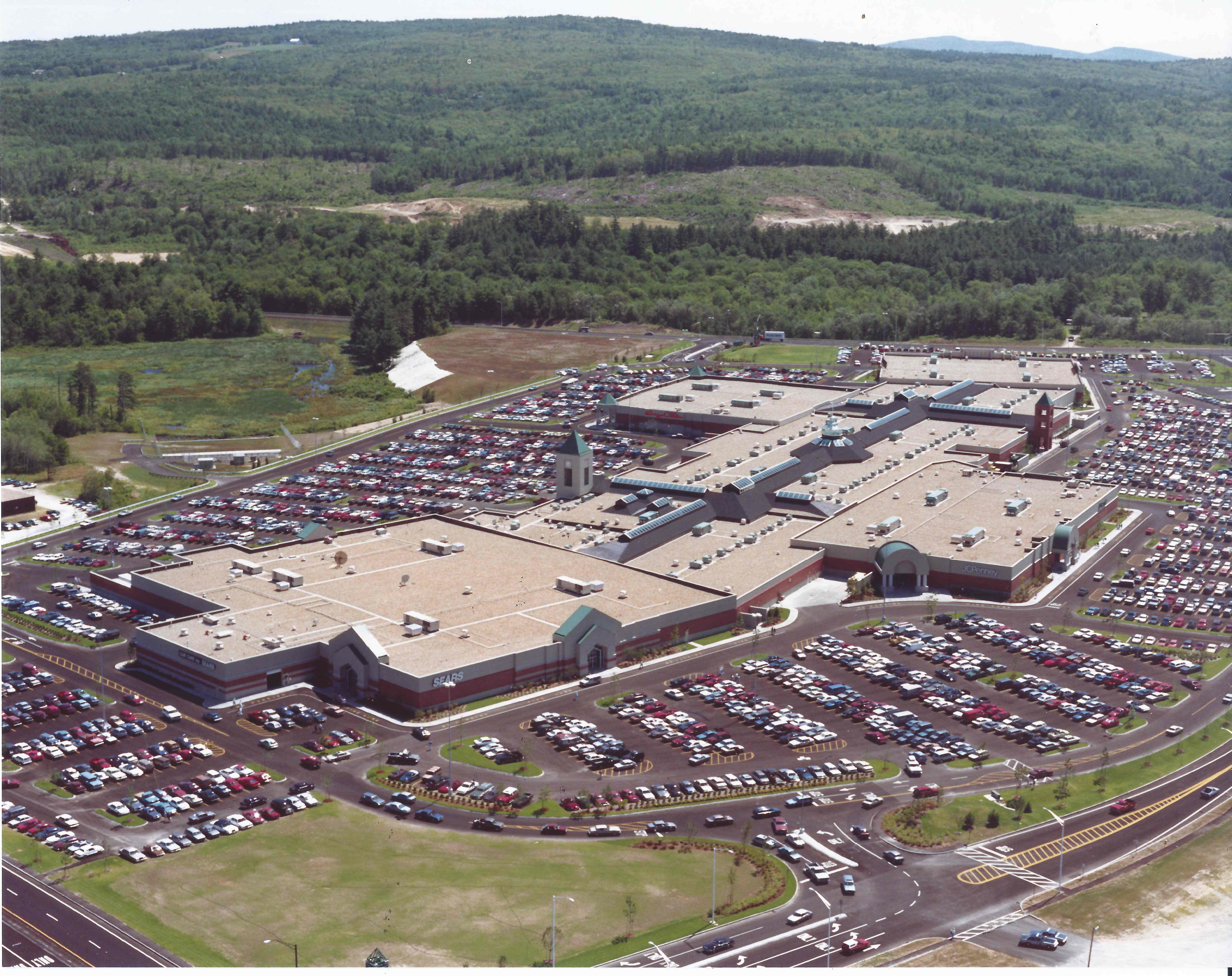
- Aerial view of Steeplegate Mall on opening day, August 1, 1990
- Location: Concord, New Hampshire, U.S.
- Address: 270 Loudon Road
- Opened: August 1, 1990; 36 years ago
- Closed: April 22, 2022; 4 years ago (Note: Three exterior access-only anchor tenants continue to operate out of the existing building as of November 2025.)
- Developer: Homart Development Company
- Manager: Colliers Properties
- Owner: Onyx Partners Ltd.
- Num. of stores: 60 spaces; 3 remaining
- Num. of anchor tenants: 1 (store; 2 non-traditional)
- Floor area: 481,722 square feet (44,753 m^{2})
- Floors: 1
- Website: Official website at the Wayback Machine (November 2020 archive)

Steeplegate Mall is a shuttered, enclosed shopping mall in Concord, New Hampshire, United States. Opened in 1990, it has struggled with high vacancy rates throughout its existence. Although the mall is closed, three businesses, including a JCPenney anchor store from opening day, a health club, and a trampoline park, continue to operate out of the mall building (including the continued use of its parking lot) due to long-term leases.

The mall opened with four large retail anchor stores, a food court with a 630-square-foot (59 m^{2}) mosaic, and room for about 62 storefronts, depending on layout. During the mall's decade of decline prior to 2024, it featured several non-traditional tenants including a live performance theater that operated from 2016 to 2024, a short-lived charter school from 2018 to 2020, a pickleball club from 2022 to 2024, and the still-operating trampoline park and health club.

The mall closed on April 22, 2022, closing access to its interior and evicting the few remaining businesses within; at that time, six businesses in the mall building with exterior entrances were allowed to continue operation. The building and an adjacent movie theater were sold to new owners in 2023, who proposed to tear most of the building and the theater down and build a large mixed-use development with apartments and some retail. In January 2024, all but the aforementioned JCPenney, health club, and trampoline park were evicted to make way for the redevelopment. The redevelopment project has faced several delays since, with lawsuits filed against the current owners.

== History ==
The 481,722-square-foot (44,753-square-meter) mall opened August 1, 1990, with Sears, JCPenney, Sage-Allen and Steinbach as its anchors. It was built by Homart Development Company.

Steinbach closed its store in 1999 as part of the company's bankruptcy. Sage-Allen, which closed in the fall of 1992 and remained vacant for seven years, became The Bon-Ton in 1999, with a second Bon-Ton and Circuit City splitting the former Steinbach. Circuit City liquidated and closed in 2009. By 2010, the mall was the largest taxpayer in Concord, with an assessed value of $72 million.

=== Decline ===
In 2011, General Growth Properties, the successor company to Homart, transferred ownership of the mall, along with 29 other underperforming malls, to its Rouse Properties subsidiary. In August 2014, Rouse Properties announced that it had defaulted on its loan for Steeplegate Mall and was in the process of turning over the property to its lenders. By April 2015 the property was owned by a consortium of lenders including Wells Fargo Bank and Midland Loan Servicing and managed by Colliers International.

In January 2015, Old Navy, one of four main anchors at the mall, closed its doors.

In May 2016, Steeplegate Mall was bought by the New York-based Namdar Realty Group for $10.4 million.

As part of an attempt to diversify from traditional retail and food stores, Hatbox Theater, a live theater venue located in the former Coldwater Creek and using the adjoining former RadioShack space for storage and rehearsals, opened in 2016. Similarly, VIP Bounce Houses and Laser Tag opened in the former Old Navy location that year.

In April 2018, Bon-Ton closed both of its stores as part of a plan to close 42 stores nationwide. Later that same year, a charter school called Capital City Charter School moved into the former Bon-Ton men's clothing and houseware store, although it closed and filed for bankruptcy in 2021, while an Altitude Trampoline Park franchise opened within the former Circuit City space in November.

In 2019, a health club called The Zoo opened a franchise in the former Bon-Ton women's and children's store, marking the first time since Circuit City's closure that all five anchors in the mall had an active permanent tenant. In 2019, one of the mall's oldest tenants, a confectionery called True Confections Candies & Gifts, moved out of the mall, citing declining foot traffic and the mall owners' unwillingness to lower rent rates.

On February 6, 2020, Sears closed the Steeplegate Mall store as part of closing 96 stores nationwide, which left JCPenney as the only traditional anchor. The former Sears store was used as a state vaccination site during the COVID-19 pandemic.

=== Mall interior closes for overhaul ===
In February 2022, the mall's owners told the five remaining businesses that were only accessible from inside the mall to vacate their spaces by March 2022 for upcoming unspecified changes to the mall's interior. The same month, the owners also told the Hatbox Theatre, which only had an exterior entrance, that it had until March 13 to vacate the spaces it used. However, the owners renounced their demands shortly afterward and allowed the theater to stay, although Hatbox was no longer permitted to use the adjoining former RadioShack space. By April 2022, all of the last five interior-only businesses vacated the mall; four of them moved to other locations—three to elsewhere in Concord and one to Hooksett—while the fifth decided to close permanently. On April 22, the mall closed its interior to visitors, leaving only the six remaining businesses with exterior entrances—JCPenney, Talbots, Chico's, Hatbox Theatre, The Zoo Health Club, and Altitude Trampoline Park. On December 8, 2022, a pickleball club called All-Stars Pickleball Club opened in the former Old Navy space.

=== Proposed demolition and redevelopment ===
In 2023, owner Namdar Realty Group sold the mall to Onyx Partners Ltd. of Needham, Massachusetts for $18.18 million. Onyx announced plans to demolish most of the mall to build a mixed-use retail and residential development with 625 apartments in place of both the mall and the adjacent Regal Cinemas movie theater, the latter of which closed on April 18, 2024. The proposal began city review in September 2023. In November 2023, all remaining tenants except for the pickleball club and long-term leaseholders JCPenney, The Zoo Health Club, and Altitude Trampoline Park, were sent legal notices to vacate the mall by the end of January 2024; the pickleball club's lease expired in May 2024, after which it relocated elsewhere. The three long-term leaseholders will remain in standalone buildings derived from the mall building after its demolition, with The Zoo Health Club moving into the space next to Altitude Trampoline Park.

By June 2024, urban explorers began accessing the closed portions of the mall, with some vandalizing the interior, leading to several arrests. The mall's owners responded by installing fencing around the perimeter of the closed sections of the mall and boarding up closed entrances. The owners also filed a permit on June 18 for a partial demolition of the mall, which the Concord Planning Board approved on July 17. Demolition was delayed due to a lawsuit filed against Onyx by the landlord of a half-acre parcel containing a TD Bank franchise located on the east end of the mall's parking lot adjacent to Sheep Davis Road (New Hampshire Route 106); Onyx bought the TD Bank parcel for $2.5 million, effectively ending the lawsuit.

The demolition was delayed again after Onyx received another lawsuit and a temporary restraining order from JCPenney franchise holder Penney Property Sub Holdings LLC. The franchise holder argued that the demolition plans violated the terms of their lease, which in 2024 was extended to July 31, 2030, although they and Onyx were negotiating a resolution as of April 7, 2025.

In November 2025, the mall owners listed several spaces within the former mall for lease under the name "Steeplegate Crossing", leading to speculation that the previous redevelopment plans, including the housing and demolition portions of the redevelopment, have been abandoned in favor of redeveloping the existing mall building. By that time, the mall's assessed value was $12.6 million, around a sixth of its 2010 peak.

In April 2026, Onyx settled their dispute with the JCPenney franchise, thus resuming the original redevelopment plans. The following month, Onyx submitted an updated version of the redevelopment plans that removes JCPenney entirely, with the only remaining portion of the existing mall building planned to be maintained as a standalone building being the trampoline park and the space where the health club would be moved to. The updated plans also slightly reduces the number of new apartments from 625 to 600, and adds two new smaller retail buildings along the D'Amante Drive side.

In July 2026, it was discovered that Onyx and The Zoo Health Club have been in a legal dispute since late 2024, with the health club being dissatisfied with Onyx's plans to move them into the smaller former Bon-Ton men's and housewares space next to the trampoline club at a higher rent, and Onyx trying to evict the Zoo since early 2025. The Zoo had subletted its space with other businesses, with Onyx claiming that some of the businesses were not allowed under the Zoo's lease, and also that the Zoo stopped paying its full rent. The Zoo sued Onyx in May 2025 to block the eviction, arguing that both the previous mall owners and Onyx already knew about and agreed to the subletted businesses, only for the current mall owners to use them as leverage for eviction in retaliation against the Zoo after the health club refused to agree to the move under the terms Onyx brought forward. The eviction was temporarily blocked in court in August 2025. The two parties attempted mediation in November 2025, but it ended in April 2026 without a resolution. A hearing is scheduled for August 2026, followed by a jury trial in October. Court documents also revealed that the lawsuit with JCPenney was not yet settled. In August 2026, Onyx revealed their plans to start construction on a 110-unit apartment building on the property's northeast corner as it only has an empty parking lot with no buildings to demolish.

== Gallery ==
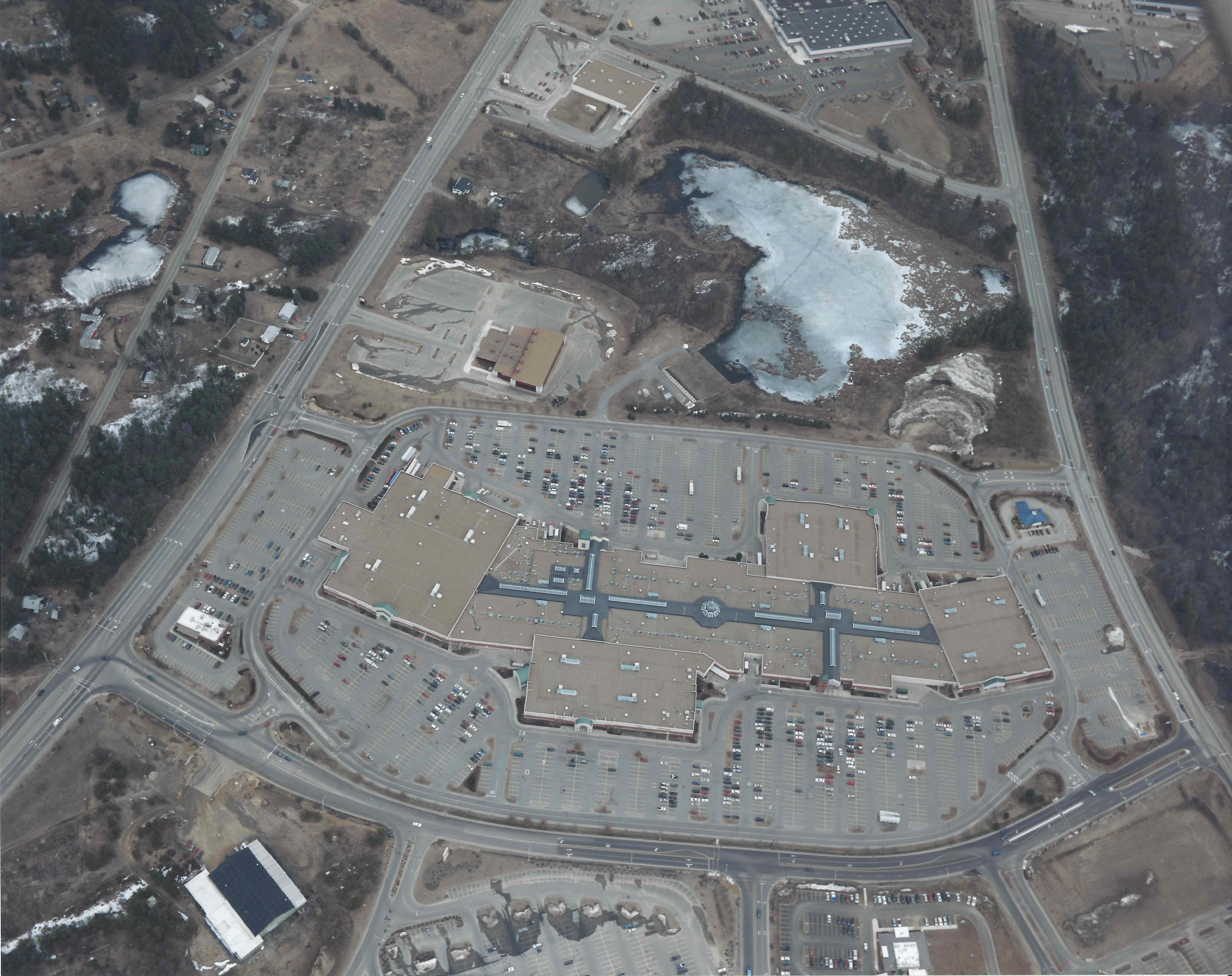
Aerial view of Steeplegate Mall taken on March 8, 2000

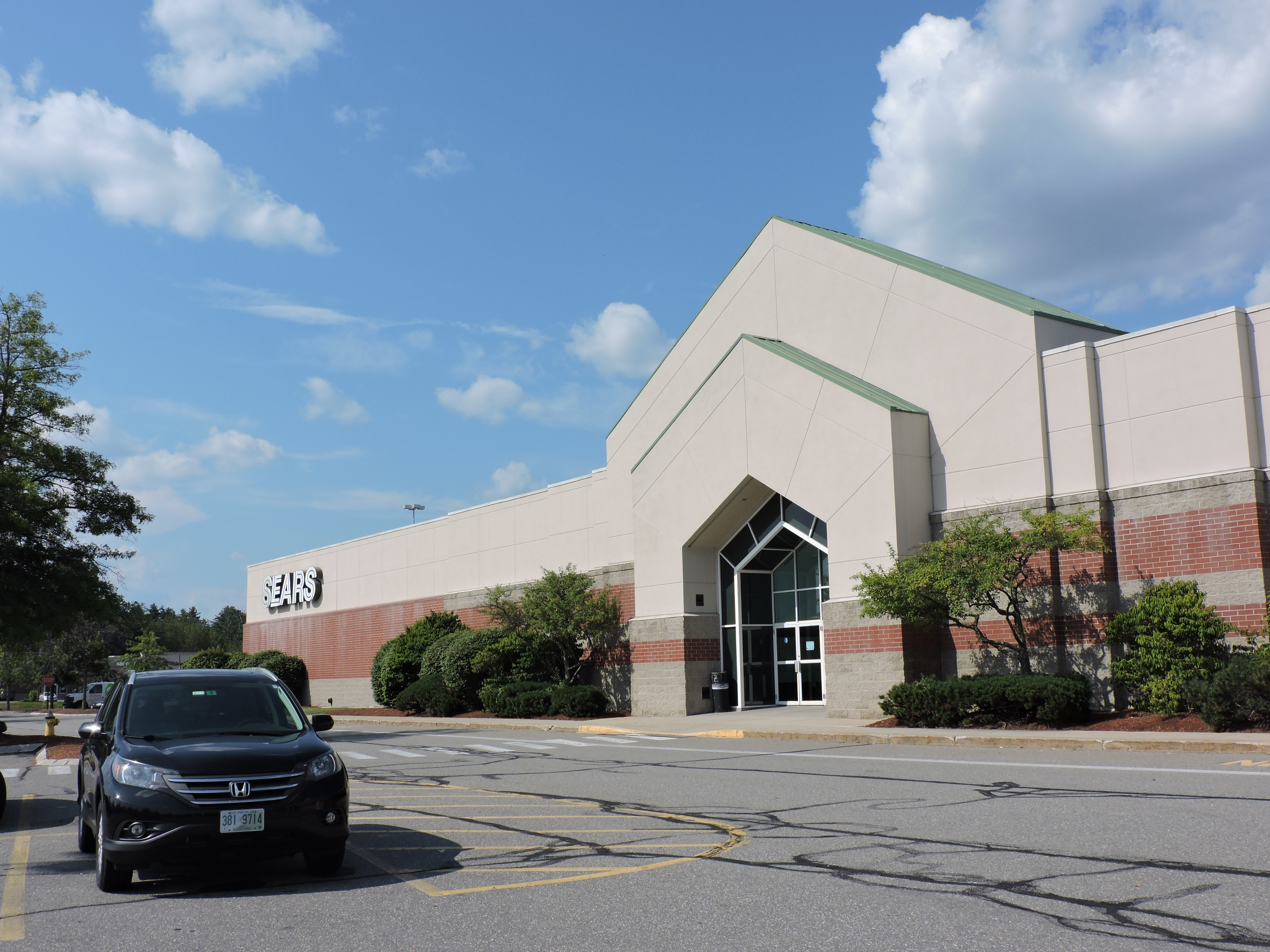
Steeplegate Sears exterior as it appeared in July 2017

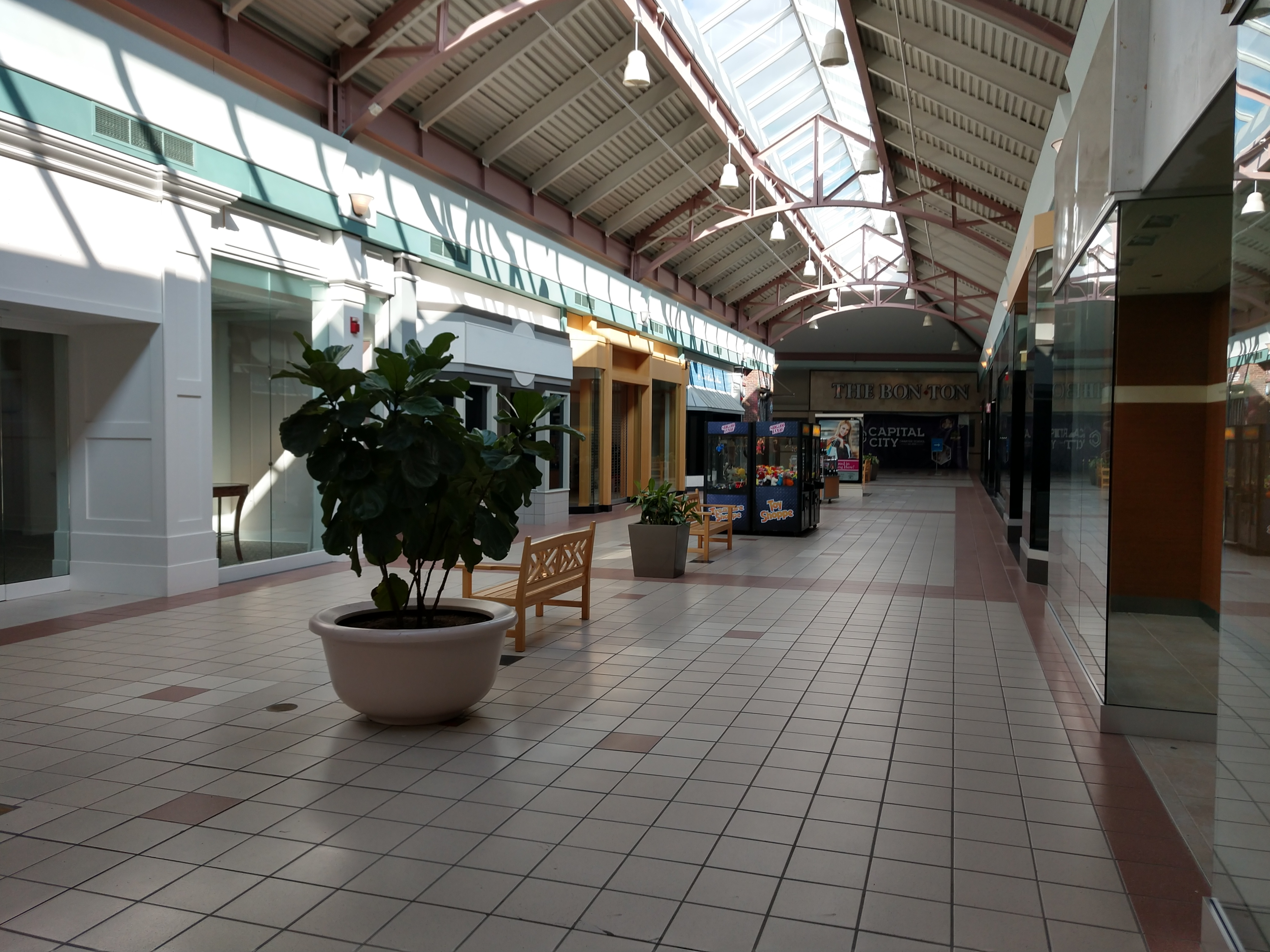
The mall's east end on July 31, 2021; all businesses and other tenants were permanently closed.

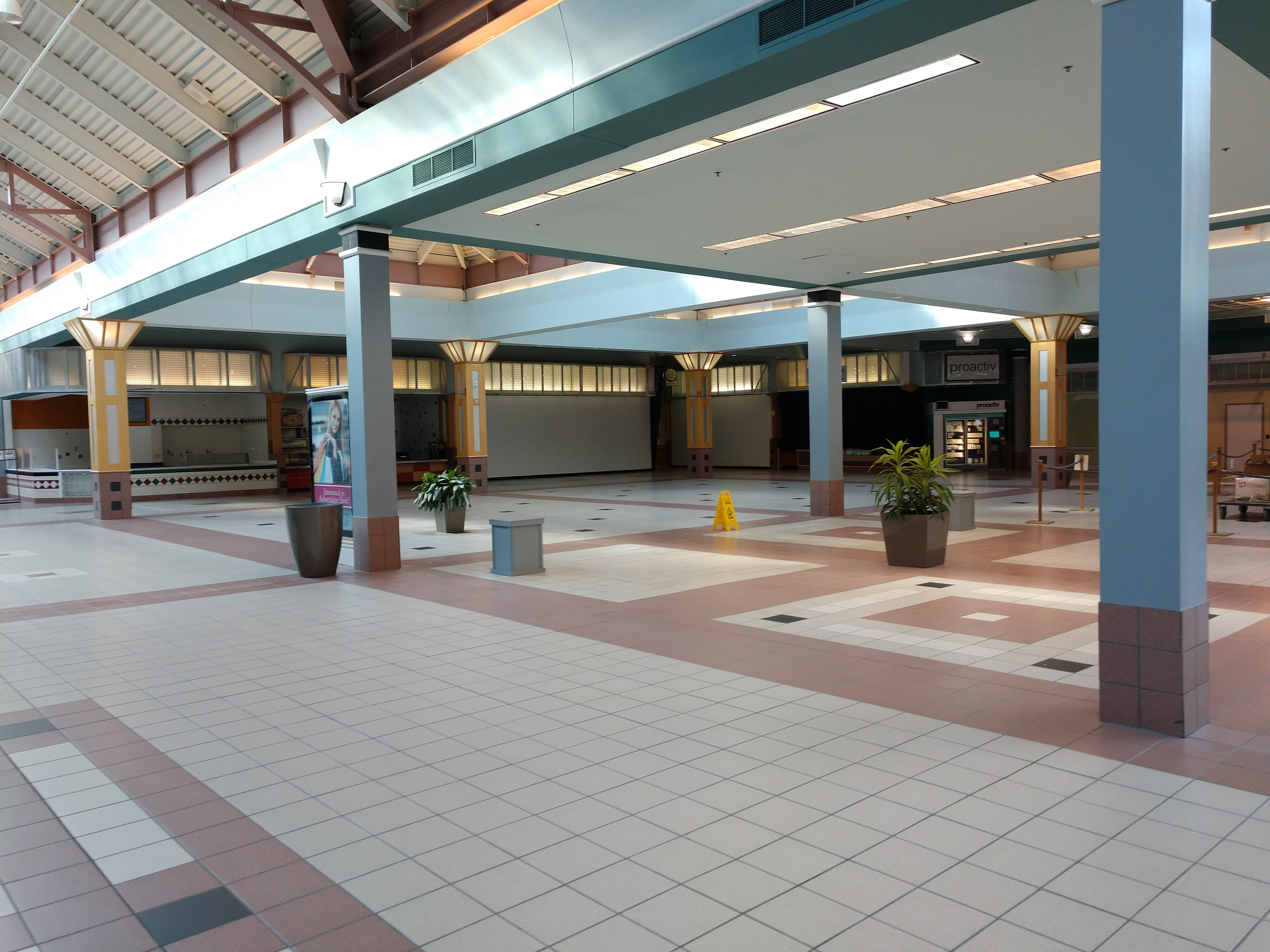
The mall's food court on July 31, 2021, with no tenants. Tables and chairs were removed during the COVID-19 pandemic.

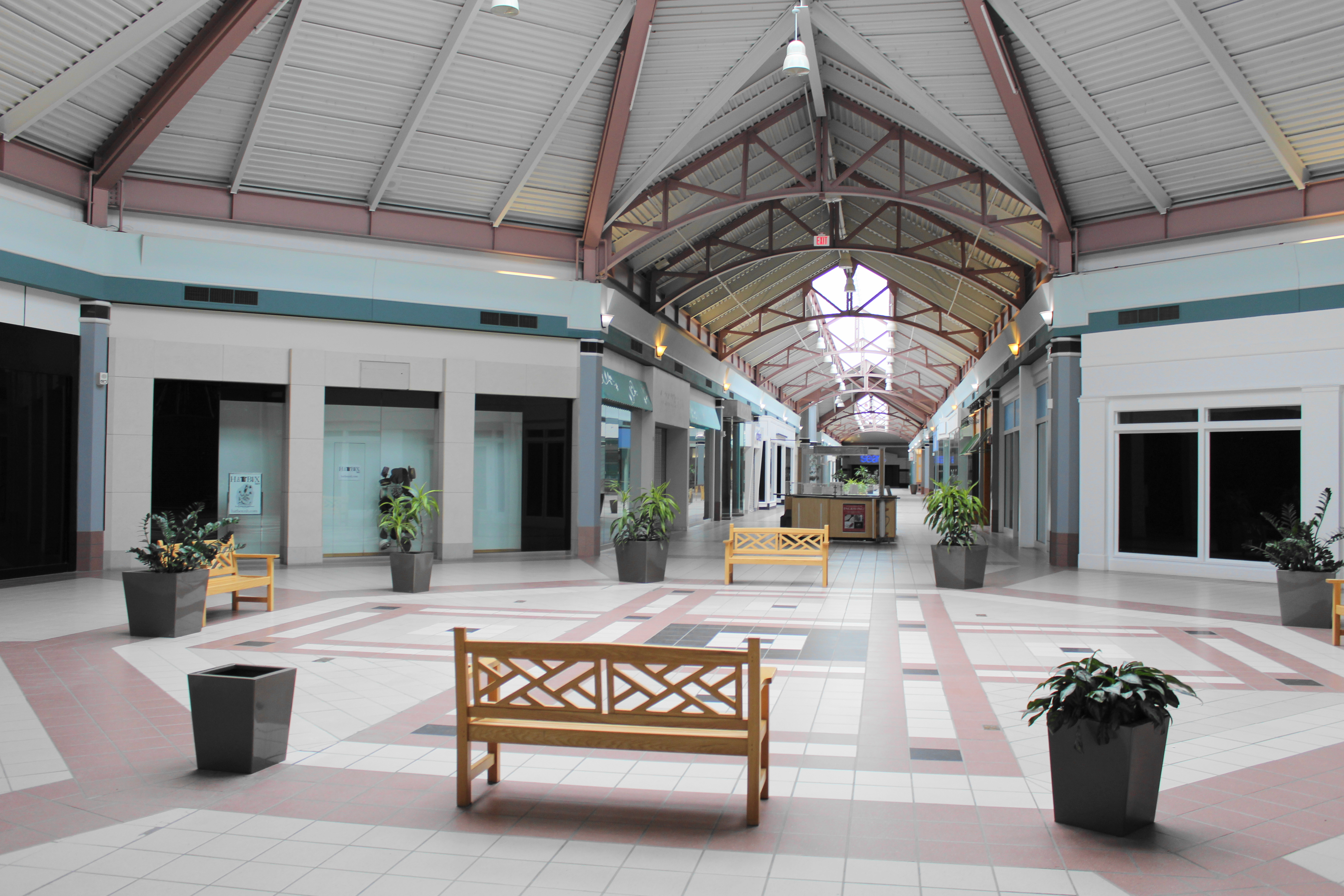
The mall's center atrium on April 16, 2022, six days before the interior's closure, looking down the mall's west end. All remaining interior-only tenants were evicted by this time.

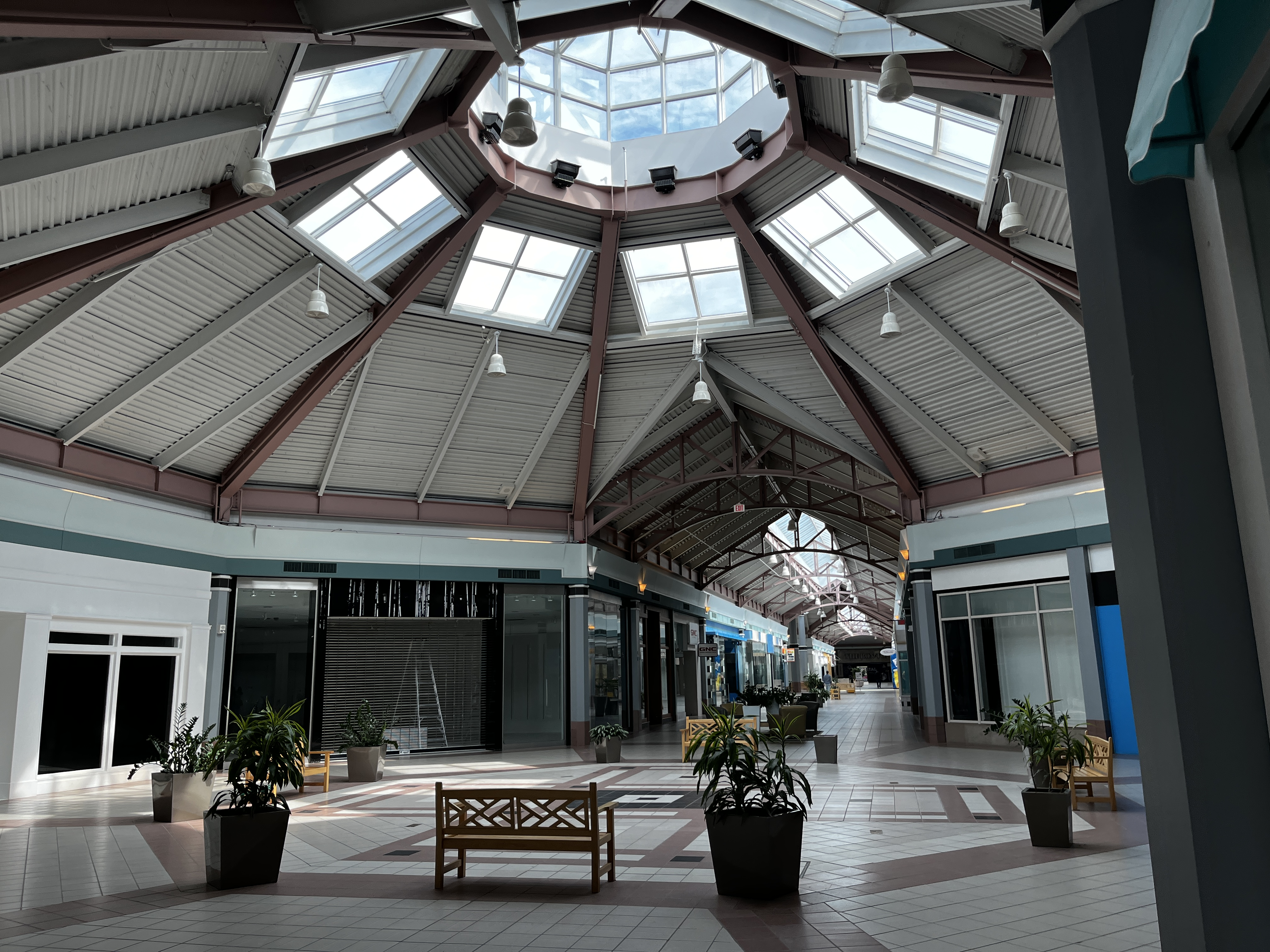
The mall's center atrium and skylight on April 16, 2022, looking down the mall's east end.

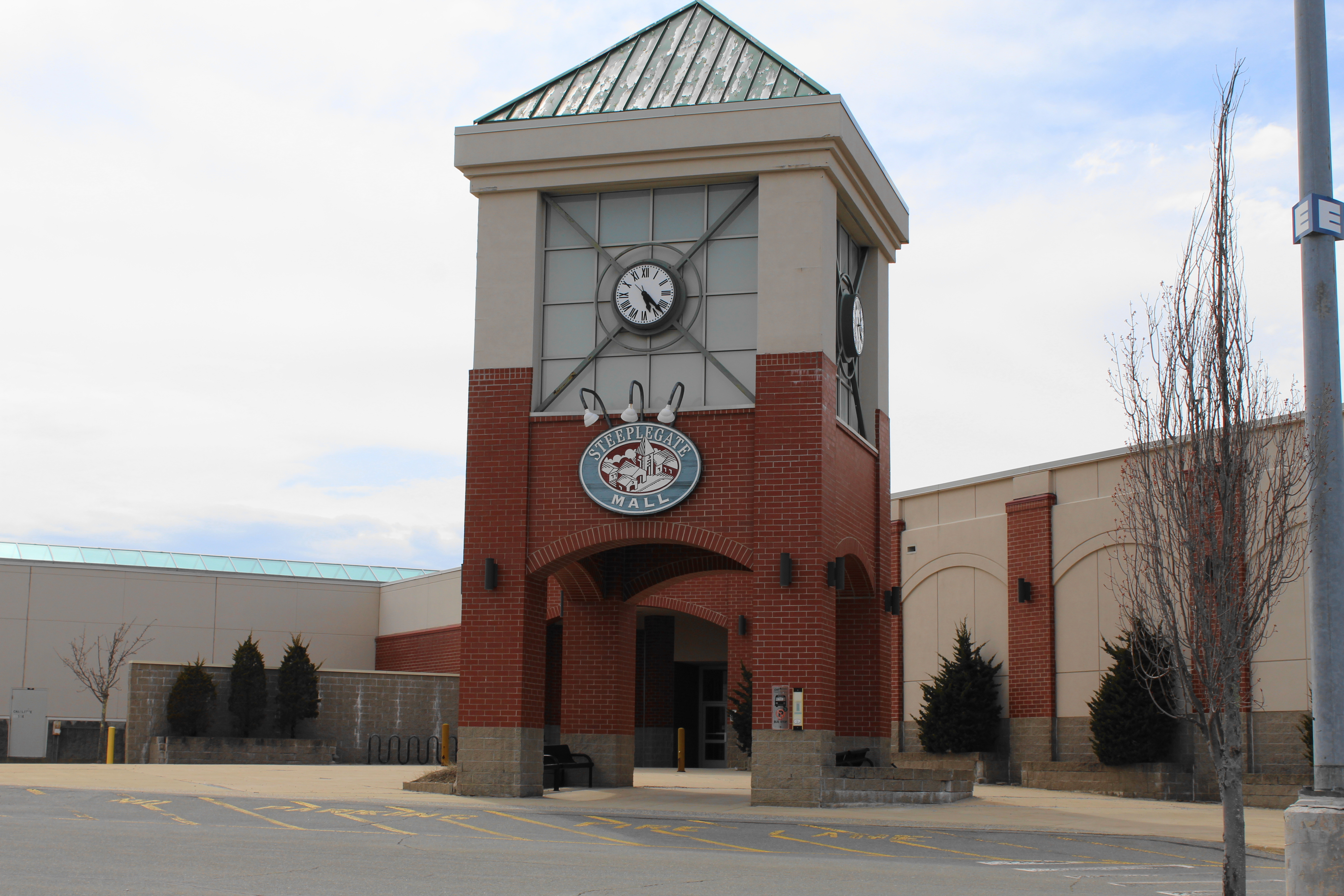
The mall's clock tower on April 16, 2022. The teal paint on the tower's roof can be seen peeling away, while rust can be seen on the bars holding the front clock and on one of the lights.

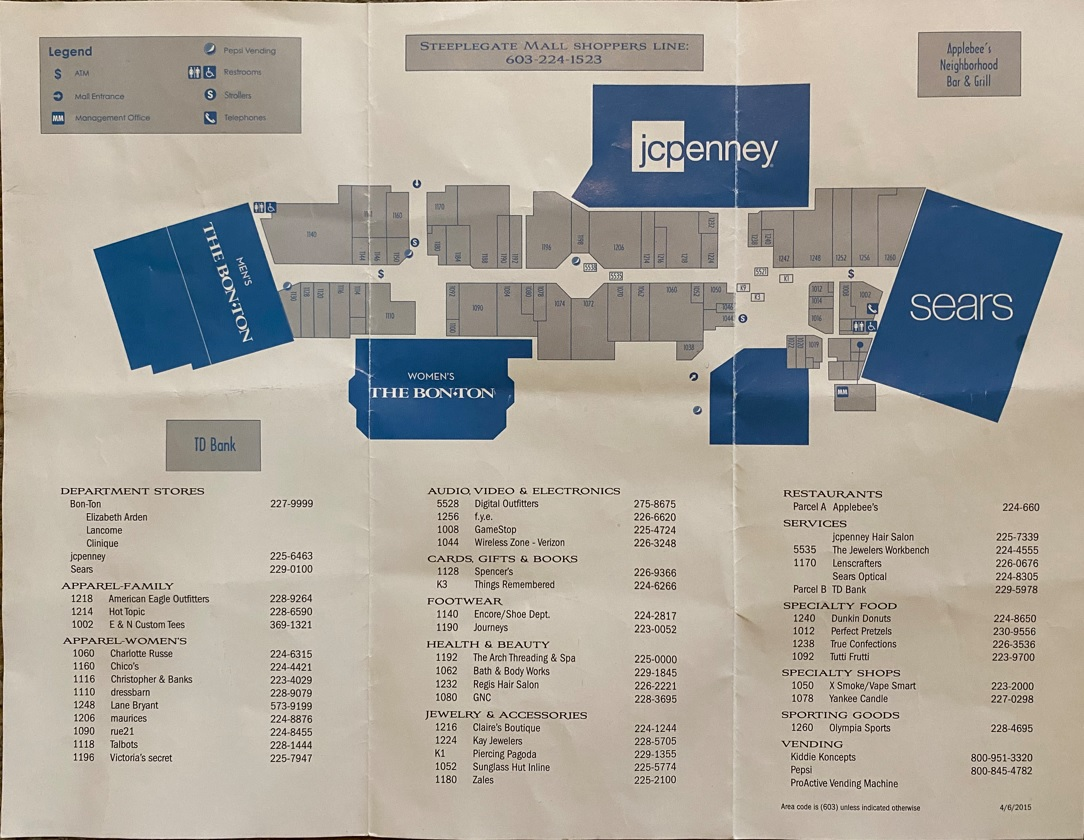
Map of Steeplegate Mall in 2015, shown on interior of brochure "Shopping & Dining Directory"

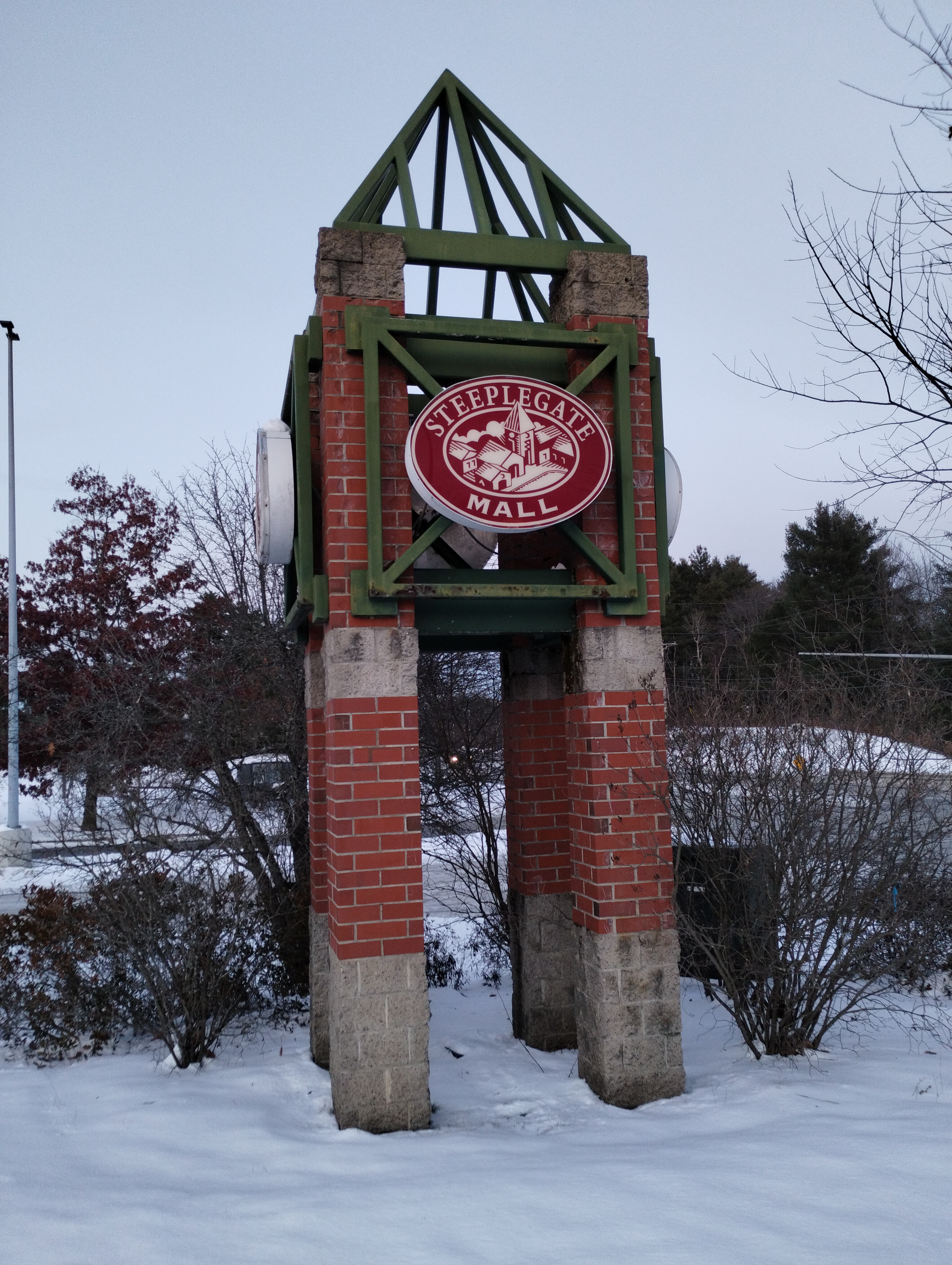
An entrance sign for the mall along Sheep Davis Road (New Hampshire Route 106) on December 5, 2025, featuring the mall's first logo.
