= Rolling Oaks Mall =

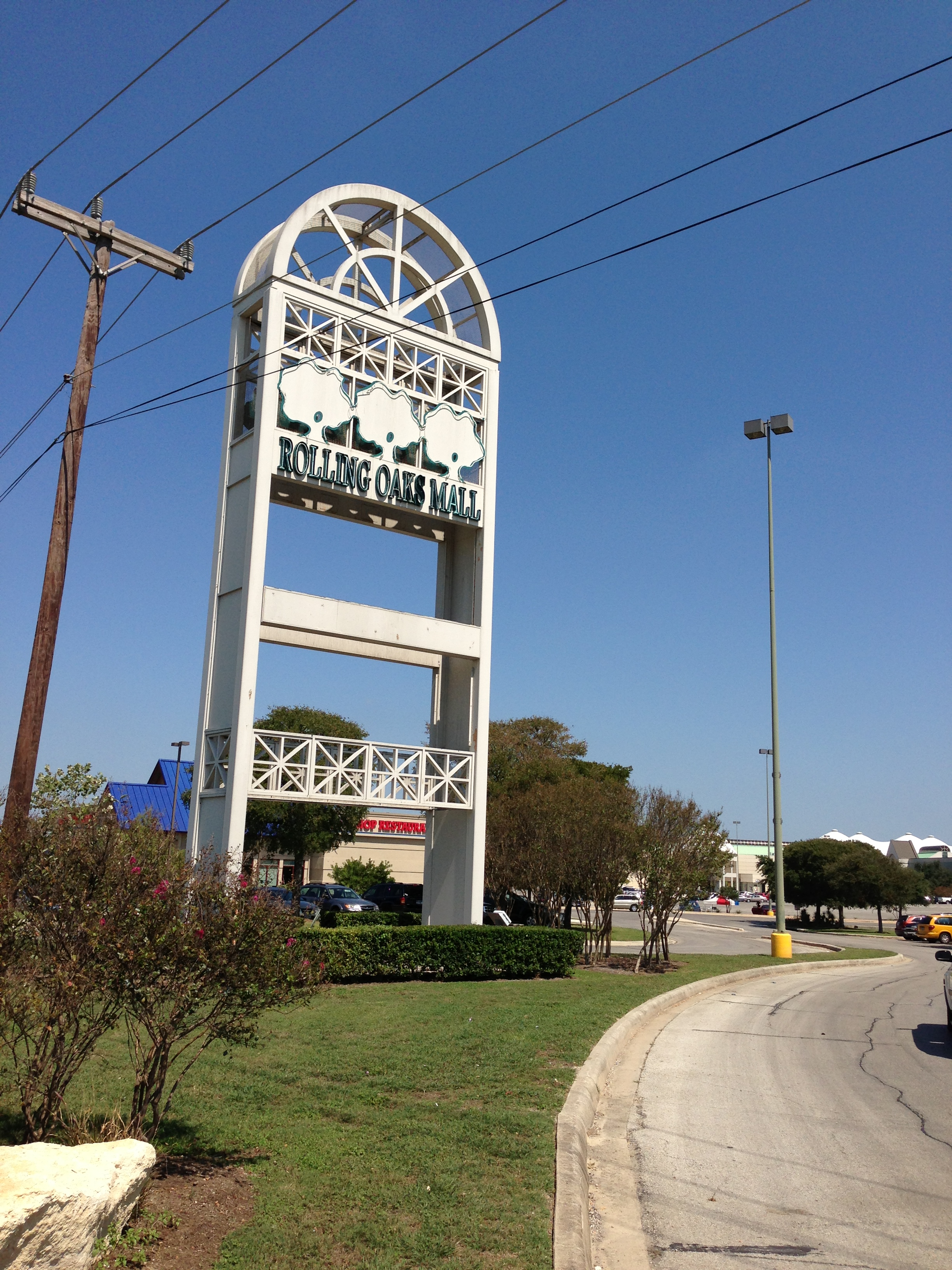
- Location: San Antonio, Texas, United States
- Coordinates: 29.597°N 98.350°W
- Opened: 1988
- Developer: Melvin Simon and Associates and Homart Development Company
- Owner: Summit Properties USA
- Num. of stores: 100+
- Num. of anchor tenants: 4 (3 open, 1 vacant)
- Floor area: 889,000 square feet (82,600 m^{2})
- Floors: 2
- Website: rollingoaksmall.com

Rolling Oaks Mall is a regional shopping mall located in northeast San Antonio, Texas, at the intersection of Loop 1604 and Nacogdoches Road. It is anchored by Dillard's, JCPenney, and Family Leisure. There is one vacant anchor stores that was once Sears.

== History ==
The mall developed by Simon Property Group and Homart Development Company opened in 1988, with anchor stores Dillard's and Sears, in a remote location surrounded mostly by farmland on the Northeast side of the city. As a result of miscalculated growth projections in the area and a less than ideal location the mall initially struggled.

A 6-screen movie theater operated by Act III Theaters under the Santikos Entertainment brand opened in 1991, and a Beall's in 1995. The theater and Beall's closed in 2001. The theater space eventually became a skate park and is now an Inflatable Wonderland. The Beall's space reopened as an H&M outlet in 2017. In 1992 the mall expanded its retail area with a new wing and added a third anchor, Foley's (rebranded as Macy's in 2006).

As the city grew to meet the mall, Rolling Oaks has repositioned itself and is a stable retail center. Additionally, JCPenney opened a new store at the mall in 2004. The original site plan was designed to accommodate 5 anchor stores and one minor anchor store. In 2014 Simon Property Group rolled over ownership of Rolling Oaks Mall, along with 97 other smaller properties in their portfolio into its REIT, Washington Prime Group.

On June 19, 2020, it was announced that Sears would be closing as part of a plan to close 28 stores nationwide. The store closed in August 2020.

On January 6, 2021, it was announced that Macy's would be closing in April 2021 as part of a plan to close 46 stores nationwide. The store closed in April 2021. The mall was purchased by the Kohan Retail Investment Group in September 2022.

In 2024, the former Macy’s at Rolling Oaks Mall was bought by an entity linked with the local outlet of the Family Leisure furniture store. The company that bought it had plans to open a Family Leisure furniture store in the space of the former Macy’s. The store eventually opened later in 2024, utilizing the entire former Macy’s space.

=== 2017 shooting ===
On January 22, 2017, Jonathan Murphy, 42 was killed and two others were injured after two men robbed a jewelry store in the mall. Police Chief William McManus released in a statement that after the two suspects fled the store on Sunday, they were accosted by a pair of "good Samaritans", at least one of whom was armed using a concealed carry permit. One suspect was injured in a successful attempt to stop him; however, Murphy, who was among the pair of Samaritans, was shot and killed in the process. The other suspect fled the mall, firing his weapon and injuring others. He was eventually caught and arrested by Converse police later that day after crashing a stolen getaway car. The two suspects, Jose Luis Rojas and Jason Prieto were later charged with capital murder. In 2018, Rojas was sentenced to life after pleading guilty to the reduced charged of murder plus 20 years. Later that year, Prieto was convicted of murder instead of capital murder and was sentenced to 40 years.

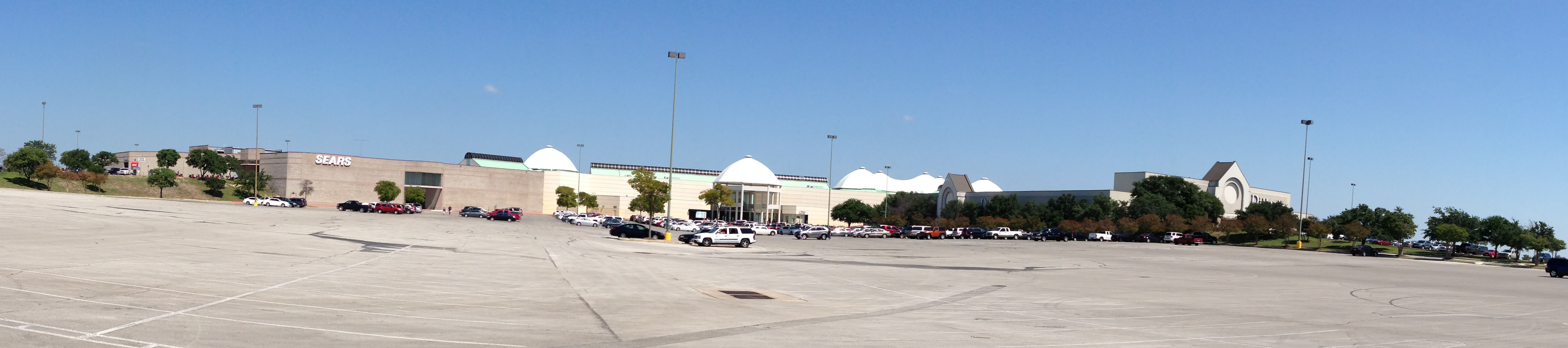

== Major anchors ==
- Dillard's (opened 1988, 176,585 sq ft.)
- JCPenney (opened 2004, 136,312 sq ft.)
- Family Leisure (opened 2024, 150,313 sq ft.)

== Minor anchors ==
- H&M (opened 2017, 20,000 sq ft.)

== Former anchors ==
- Beall's (opened 1995, closed 2001, became H&M 2017, 20,000 sq ft.)
- Sears (opened 1988, closed August 2020, 133,935 sq ft.)
- Macy's (opened 1992 as Foley's, became Macy's 2006, closed April 2021, became Family Leisure 2024, 150,313 sq ft.)
