= Deadmalls.com =

American website

- Deadmalls.com
- Website type: Dead mall
- Headquarters: Glens Falls, New York, United States
- Owners: Pete Blackbird; Brian Florence
- Creator: Various internet contributors
- Website: www.deadmalls.com
- Commercial: No
- Registration: None
- Launched: January 20, 2000; 26 years ago

Deadmalls.com is an independent non-profit website featuring shopping malls in the United States that have failed or are in the process of failing. The site features nearly 450 listings of dead or dying shopping malls, many with pictures and historical narratives.

== Background ==
Created in 2000 by friends Peter Blackbird and Brian Florence as a hobby, the website has grown, garnering interest from major media outlets due to its unusual content and its comprehensive (sometimes humorous, sometimes wistful) coverage. The creators describe the website as an attempt to retain pieces of history that might otherwise be lost with the destruction of these malls. The site benefits from hundreds of online contributors who supply the website with accounts and photos that might be otherwise difficult to obtain.

== Recognition ==
The website has also become increasingly influential in the retail and real estate industries as well. National Public Radio reports that new developers often use the site as a first point of reference, while mall owners often lobby to have their malls removed from the site, following redevelopment. The site creators have reported several incidents with mall security as well as legal threats based on photographs hosted by their site.

== See also ==
- Dan Bell, 2010s documentary series Dead Mall
- List of defunct retailers of the United States
- Jasper Mall, 2020 documentary about an Alabama dead mall
