= Windcrest, Texas =

- City
- Nickname: City of Lights
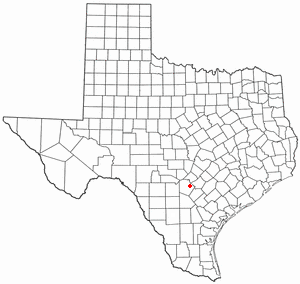
- Location of Windcrest, Texas

- Coordinates: 29°30′57″N 98°22′47″W
- Country: United States
- State: Texas
- County: Bexar

Government
  - Type: Council-Manager
  - City Council: Mayor Dan Reese; Susie Hamilton; Cindy Strzelecki, Mayor Pro Tem; Greg Turner; Marcus Yax; Adam Astleford
  - City Manager: Rafael Castillo

Area
  - Total: 2.15 sq mi (5.58 km^{2})
  - Land: 2.15 sq mi (5.57 km^{2})
  - Water: 0.0039 sq mi (0.01 km^{2})
- Elevation: 791 ft (241 m)

Population (2020)
  - Total: 5,865
  - Density: 2,733.4/sq mi (1,055.37/km^{2})
- Time zone: UTC-6 (Central (CST))
  - Summer (DST): UTC-5 (CDT)
- ZIP code: 78239
- Area codes: 210, 726
- FIPS code: 48-79672
- GNIS feature ID: 1350289
- ANSI Code: 2412280
- Website: www.windcrest-tx.gov

Windcrest is a city in Bexar County, Texas, United States. Its population was 5,865 at the 2020 census. It is part of the San Antonio metropolitan area.

== Geography ==
Windcrest is located in northeastern Bexar County. It is bordered to the north, west, and south by San Antonio and to the east by unincorporated neighborhoods in Bexar County. It is 11 miles (18 km) northeast of downtown San Antonio.

According to the United States Census Bureau, it has a total area of 2.2 square miles (5.6 km^{2}), of which 0.004 square miles (0.01 km^{2}), or 0.23%, is covered by water.

== Demographics ==
Historical population
Census	Pop.	Note	%±
1960	441		—
1970	3,371		664.4%
1980	5,332		58.2%
1990	5,331		0.0%
2000	5,105		−4.2%
2010	5,364		5.1%
2020	5,865		9.3%
U.S. Decennial Census

=== 2020 census ===
As of the 2020 census, Windcrest had a population of 5,865, 2,403 households, and 1,317 families residing in the city. The median age was 52.2 years. 15.9% of residents were under the age of 18 and 31.0% of residents were 65 years of age or older. For every 100 females there were 90.2 males, and for every 100 females age 18 and over there were 88.2 males age 18 and over. The census also reported 941 Veterans and that 10.6% of the population were foreign born persons.

100.0% of residents lived in urban areas, while 0.0% lived in rural areas. The population density was 2,727.9 inhabitants per square mile (1,053.2/km^{2}).

There were 2,403 households in Windcrest, of which 22.2% had children under the age of 18 living in them. Of all households, 53.1% were married-couple households, 15.0% were households with a male householder and no spouse or partner present, and 27.4% were households with a female householder and no spouse or partner present. About 26.0% of all households were made up of individuals and 15.0% had someone living alone who was 65 years of age or older.

There were 2,531 housing units, of which 5.1% were vacant. The homeowner vacancy rate was 1.7% and the rental vacancy rate was 4.7%.

Racial composition as of the 2020 census
Race	Number	Percent
White	3,204	54.6%
Black or African American	697	11.9%
American Indian and Alaska Native	44	0.8%
Asian	244	4.2%
Native Hawaiian and Other Pacific Islander	12	0.2%
Some other race	489	8.3%
Two or more races	1,175	20.0%
Hispanic or Latino (of any race)	2,036	34.7%

=== American Community Survey (2019–2023) estimates ===
97.4% of households had a computer, and 96.1% had a broadband access subscription.

The median income for a household in the city was $95,329 (in 2023 dollars). The per capita income for the city in the past 12 months was $53,595 (in 2023 dollars). 9.2% of the population were below the poverty line, nearly half the percentage of neighboring San Antonio. The median value of owner occupied housing units was $276,900 (2019-2023).

== Education ==
The city is served by North East Independent School District.

Zoned schools include: Windcrest Elementary School in Windcrest, Ed White Middle School in San Antonio, and Roosevelt High School in San Antonio.

Area charter schools include Premier High School and Compass Rose Journey.
