= The Players =

The Players may refer to:

== In film ==
- The Players (2012 film), a French film also known as Les Infidèles
- The Players (2020 film), an Italian film also known as Gli infedeli
- The Players (2025 film), a Canadian drama film by writer and director Sarah Galea-Davis

== In music ==
- The Players Band, an American ska band 2000s
- The Players (American band), 1960s
- The Players (Malagasy band), 1970s, with Eusèbe Jaojoby a member from 1975 to 1979 when it disbanded
- The Players (Norwegian band), a Norwegian boyband

== In organizations ==
- The Players (Detroit, Michigan), an amateur actor's club in Detroit
- The Players (New York City), Edwin Booth's historic actors' club in New York

== In sports ==
- One side in the annual Gentlemen v Players cricket match
- The Players Championship, a golf tournament on the PGA Tour

== See also ==
- Players (disambiguation)
- Player (disambiguation)
