= Fair Play =

Fair play or Fairplay usually refers to sportsmanship.

Fair play or Fairplay may also refer to:

== Arts and entertainment ==
- Fair Play (1925 film), an American silent film
- Fair Play, a 1972 TV movie starring Paul Ford
- Fair Play (2014 film), a Czech drama
- Fair Play (2023 film), an American erotic thriller film
- Fairplay (2022 film), a Swiss-French short film
- Fair Play (novel) (Rent spel), by Finnish author Tove Jansson
- Fair Play, a 2021 play by Ella Road
- "Fair Play" (song), a song by Van Morrison from his 1974 album Veedon Fleece
- "Fairplay", a song by Soul II Soul from their 1989 album Club Classics Vol. One

== Sports ==
- Fair and unfair play, in cricket
- Fairplay Index, a ranking system in rugby
- FIFA Fair Play campaign, a program to increase sportsmanship in association football
  - FIFA Fair Play Trophy (disambiguation), a World Cup association football Finals award given for sportsmanship
  - FIFA Fair Play Award, a formal recognition of good sportsmanship in association football in general
- UEFA Fair Play ranking, a ranking system used by the Union of European Football Associations
- UEFA Financial Fair Play Regulations
- Fair Play (horse), an American Hall of Fame Thoroughbred racehorse
- KK Fair Play, a defunct basketball club in Serbia

== United States place names ==
- Fair Play, California
  - Fair Play AVA, a wine region
- Fairplay, Colorado
- Fairplay, Douglas County, Georgia
- Fairplay, Kentucky
- Fairplay, Maryland
- Fair Play, Missouri
- Fair Play, New Jersey
- Fairplay, Ohio
- Fairplay, Pennsylvania
- Fair Play, South Carolina
- Fair Play, Texas
- Fair Play, Wisconsin
- Fairplay Township, Greene County, Indiana
- Fairplay Township, Marion County, Kansas

== Other uses ==
- Fair Play for Cuba Committee, a 1960s United States activist group
- Fair Play Men, 18th century Pennsylvania area squatters
- FairPlay, a digital rights management system from Apple Inc.
- Fairplay (magazine), a shipping news publication
- Jonny Fairplay (Jon Dalton, born 1974), participant on the reality TV show Survivor: Pearl Islands
- Chwarae Teg (Welsh for fair play), a charity organisation in Wales
- "Fair Play", the slogan on the costumes of the DC Comics superheroes Mister Terrific
- The 1977 Pakistani military coup, code named Operation Fair Play

== See also ==
- Playfair (disambiguation)
- Play (disambiguation)
- Fair (disambiguation)
