= Played =

Played may refer to:

- Played (album), a 1987 album
- Played (film), a 2006 film
- Played (TV series), a 2013 TV series

== See also ==
- Plaid (disambiguation)
- Play (disambiguation)
- Player (disambiguation)
