= Cranium Command =

Former attraction at Walt Disney World

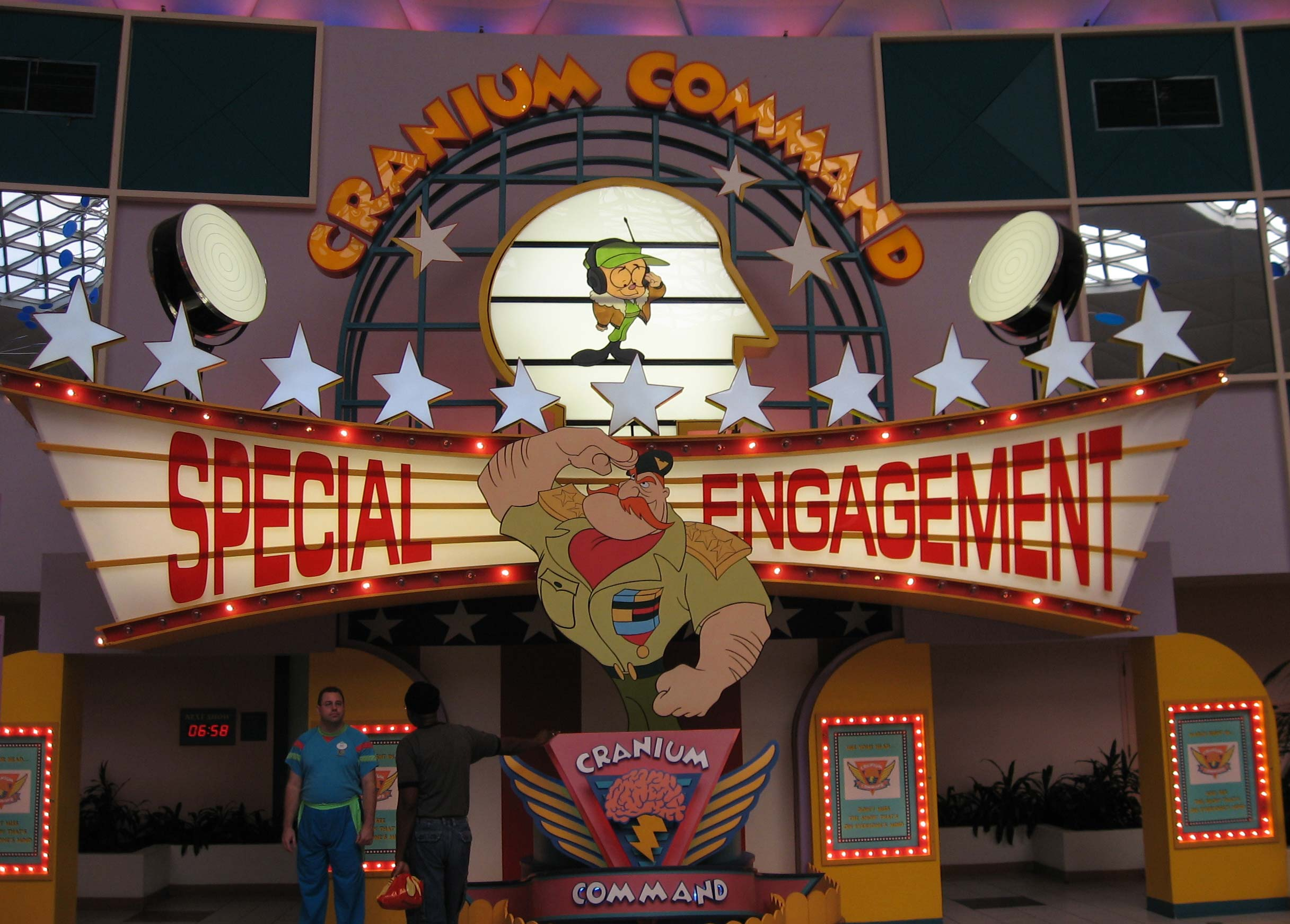
- The attraction marquee featuring Buzzy (top) and General Knowledge (bottom).

Epcot
- Area: Future World; Wonders of Life Pavilion
- Coordinates: 28°22′29.45″N 81°32′47.32″W
- Status: Removed
- Opening date: October 19, 1989
- Closing date: January 1, 2007

Ride statistics
- Attraction type: Theater presentation
- Theme: The human brain
- Music: David Newman
- Duration: 17:00
- Host: Buzzy (Scott Curtis, Main Show Only)
- Producer: Jay Heit
- Director: Jerry Rees; Opening Sequence: Gary Trousdale; Kirk Wise
- Pre-show length: 5:00

Cranium Command was an attraction at the Wonders of Life pavilion at Walt Disney World Resort's Epcot theme park. The show was a humorous presentation on the importance of the human brain.

The show's script was written by Jenny Tripp, a staff writer in Disney Feature Animation, and directed by Jerry Rees, who in addition to many other Disney film-based attractions, directed The Brave Little Toaster (1987). The pre-show was the first directing effort of Gary Trousdale and Kirk Wise, who later directed Disney Animation's Beauty and the Beast (1991), The Hunchback of Notre Dame (1996), and Atlantis: The Lost Empire (2001).

It premiered on October 19, 1989; as of January 4, 2004 it began to operate seasonally, closing permanently on January 1, 2007. During the 2007 International Food & Wine Festival, the entrance was used as a wine presentation. The pavilion has continued to be used for various Epcot festival events.

== Preshow ==
From the entrance at the back of the pavilion, guests walked into a holding room with a digital counter reading the time until the next show. On the walls hung propaganda posters encouraging guests to enlist in the "Cranium Command" (similar signage could be seen advertising the show around the Wonders of Life pavilion). There was also signage including brain teasers and gags and puns, setting the stage for both the concept and tone. Guests were then led into a narrow, tall room with brightly colored carpeted walls. Facing the guests was a movie screen, and closed automatic doors to their left.

The movie screen would soon illuminate showing an animated segment featuring the boisterous and loud General Knowledge (voiced by Corey Burton) briefing his "Cranium Commando" troops on their mission: to pilot human brains and keep the people they are in out of trouble. A bumbling little soldier named Buzzy (Scott Curtis) had been given one of the most difficult missions of all: piloting a twelve-year-old boy. At the end of the preshow, General Knowledge directed guests towards the theater as the automatic doors swung open.

== Show ==
The main show was presented in a 200-seat, dimly-lit theater designed to represent the inside of a human head; the outside world was shown on a pair of rear-projection screens resembling eyes. Buzzy was now presented as an Audio-Animatronic on an articulated seat so that he could move around during the performance. Helping him pilot the twelve-year-old Bobby (Scott Curtis), via appearances on other screens, were the logical Left Brain (Charles Grodin), the wacky Right Brain (Jon Lovitz), the hungry Stomach (George Wendt), the panicky Bladder (Jeff Doucette, in an uncredited role), the hyperventilating Lungs (Kevin Meaney, also uncredited), the overreactive Adrenal Gland (Bobcat Goldthwait), and the heart's Right and Left Ventricles (Dana Carvey and Kevin Nealon, reprising their Hans and Franz roles from Saturday Night Live). The monotone Hypothalamus (voiced by Kirk Wise), which regulated autonomic bodily functions, was also represented via Audio-Animatronics as a robot.

The show took Bobby through a typical, if stressful, day: getting up, skipping breakfast, running to school after missing the bus, becoming infatuated with a new girl in science class (Natalie Gregory), protecting her from bullies, getting involved in a food fight at lunch, getting sent to the principal (Kenneth Kimmins), and asking the new girl out. Throughout the day, the various organs of the body reported problems to Buzzy and argued over how he should deal with the day's events. Buzzy, with General Knowledge's advice, would learn to effectively balance the needs of his body crew to combat potentially-stressful situations.

== Origins ==
The attraction was the only fully surviving element from the original 1978 plans for EPCOT Center's "Life and Health" pavilion. Titled "The Head Trip", it was to share a theatre space with a dentistry-themed show called "Tooth Follies". Designed by Imagineer Rolly Crump, the stage and concept would be similar to the final incarnation, but with three animatronics dedicated to emotion, intellect and the nervous system. When Disney was unable to find a sponsor to host the pavilion, the construction of Life and Health was delayed indefinitely. However, an expansion pad between the Universe of Energy pavilion and the Horizons pavilion was kept as Disney still planned to build it.

In the mid-1980s, then Disney CEO Michael Eisner finally secured MetLife to sponsor the Life and Health pavilion, now renamed "Wonders of Life" and restarted development. Imagineer Steve Kirk replaced Crump on the project, and worked with Barry Braveman to flesh out the idea of "The Head Trip" into its own full attraction. Partially inspired by the 1943 Walt Disney-produced animated propaganda film Reason and Emotion, they explored the idea of transforming the concept into a parody of the Star Trek franchise. The human head was to be represented as a bridge on a spaceship much like the Starship Enterprise. Kirk explained: "...there was one character with a supporting cast on film for different parts of the body. Originally there was a captain, a Mr. Spock type, several ensigns at each of the senses, there was an officer for reason, there was an officer for emotion... so there was a little cast of these little characters about, maybe, 2 feet tall in this pretty big theatre that was a pretty involved bridge of a ship, which was, again, inside the human head." Eventually, the budget was reduced to only one audio-animatronic figure and a robot, eventually becoming the Hypothalamus. Kirk hoped that the show would have been reprogrammed over the years to include different versions of the show in order to discuss a variety of health-related topics, but that idea never came to be.

== Production ==
With the budget reduction also came a new take on the concept along with its final name. Now titled "Cranium Command", the show featured a military theme wherein "brain pilots" take control of a mechanized human head. The main audio-animatronic character was dubbed "Captain Cortex" and ran the body, now that of a young boy, much like one would a military craft. He reports under his commanding officer "General Knowledge", who lectured the audience during the pre-show and then to Cortex in the main show. With time and resources running low, Imagineering outsourced production of the animated and live-action film portions to Colossal Pictures under the direction of George Evelyn. However, halfway into production Disney executives scrapped this version of the project to have it retooled by their own Feature Animation department. Animator Steve Moore, who worked on both versions, recalled, "They were doing more of a Fred Crippen, Roger Ramjet style, which was fun, but not winning points with the clients. Storytelling was Colossal's Achilles heel ...they took the story given to them by Imagineering and followed it, thinking they were giving their client what they wanted. Unfortunately, it was written like an educational film from the '40s - very dry and condescending. No amount of style could make up for the lack of substance. And even though Colossal was executing Imagineering's story, their inability to interpret the story into something workable sunk them."

In May 1989, director Jerry Rees was approached by Peter Schneider, then-president of Walt Disney Feature Animation, to speak with several Disney brass members including Eisner, Jeffrey Katzenberg, Marty Sklar and Tom Fitzgerald. They all unanimously loathed Colossal Pictures' take on "Cranium Command" and sought him out to fix it. After a brief review, Rees cited the various issues and recommended that the project be rewritten from scratch. The executives gave Rees full creative freedom aside from needing to keep General Knowledge and the overall stress-management theme, per the sponsor's request. They had five months to complete the project, as they had to reach the October deadline.

=== Animation ===
Rees rounded up as many animators from Feature Animation as he could, including Gary Trousdale, Kirk Wise and Tom Sito. The latter three along with Rees crafted an entirely new storyline in under a week with Jenny Tripp penning the script. One of the largest changes was the personality of General Knowledge, now based on R. Lee Ermey's character from Full Metal Jacket. Per Wise, "We thought it would be funny if the character who was supposed to teach you how to manage your stress screamed at you incessantly like a psychotic drill sergeant." They also changed the pilot's name from Captain Cortex to Buzzy, a bumbling young recruit. Rob Minkoff was slated to direct the animated preshow as Rees needed to focus on the live-action heavy main show, but dropped out to take over the Roger Rabbit short "Roller Coaster Rabbit". Schneider asked Trousdale and Wise duo to step in as directors. Wise said, "Saying 'yes' turned out to be the smartest thing Gary and I ever did." In addition, the pre-show of "Cranium Command" was the very last project at Disney Feature Animation to be traditionally inked and painted on cels.

=== Filming ===
While work on the animation commenced at the newly built animation wing at Disney-MGM Studios, Rees flew to Los Angeles to begin filming the live-action main show elements. Eventually he would end up directing nearly all of the show elements, per him: “Everything that you see and hear from the 8 screens, 2 Audio-Animatronic figures, and the 10 discreet channels of sound." The complexity of creating the seemingly uncut point-of-view (POV) shots which had to interact with several other pieces of media was a "wild" task for the ambitious director. Without optical or digital assistance, he used camera tricks and matching blur frames to stitch together the POV footage to seem like one continuous shot. In addition, Rees took the cinematographer and camera operators to the filming locations prior to shooting. When there, they would do tests to figure out how to make the camera express behavior and emotion such as shyness, love, anger, fear, panic and worry. This was essential to the intended immersion that you were inside a boy's head, looking out his eyes as he experienced life and reacted to it.

After the POV filming was complete, Rees took to a soundstage to film the live-action scenes involving the "body crew". He cast various famous comedians of the time to play the roles in unusual sets. The project's complexities continued to dominate, as Rees had to put one eye on the filming and one eye on a monitor playing the POV video in order to cue up the footage accordingly. Finally, he reached post-production by first mocking the eight screens of the theatre in Los Angeles and editing all the various film items together along with the animatronic dialogue, which bewildered executives such as Katzenberg when reviewing the production.

=== Programming the Animatronics ===
Once editing was complete, Rees came back to Orlando and spent the remaining time with Imagineering in the finished theatre putting all the pieces together. While Rees articulated the audio-animatronic of Buzzy, animator Rebecca Rees (Jerry's wife) took control of the live-animation of the Hypothalamus robot, as she was the one who came up with the idea behind the character. In an uncredited role, Kirk Wise voiced the Hypothalamus. For the animation of the Buzzy animatronic, Rees used the concept of the articulated arm the character sits on to create the illusion of centrifugal force. For example, when the boy's head turned right (simulated through the POV eye footage), Buzzy's platform and chair would swing to the left. This was another device to immerse the audience into the experience to feel like they were riding inside a human head even though the bench seating in the theatre did not move.

=== Music ===
Composer David Newman, who had previously worked with Rees on The Brave Little Toaster and "Back to Neverland" (a short about animation at Disney-MGM Studios) wrote the show's music score. The pre-show's score evokes the tone of military marching music, but becomes more orchestral in the main show. Unlike most music created for theme park attractions, there are multiple leitmotifs more in common with a fuller film score. In an interview, Newman briefly cited that it was a lot of fun, much like his other projects with Rees.

== Reception and legacy ==
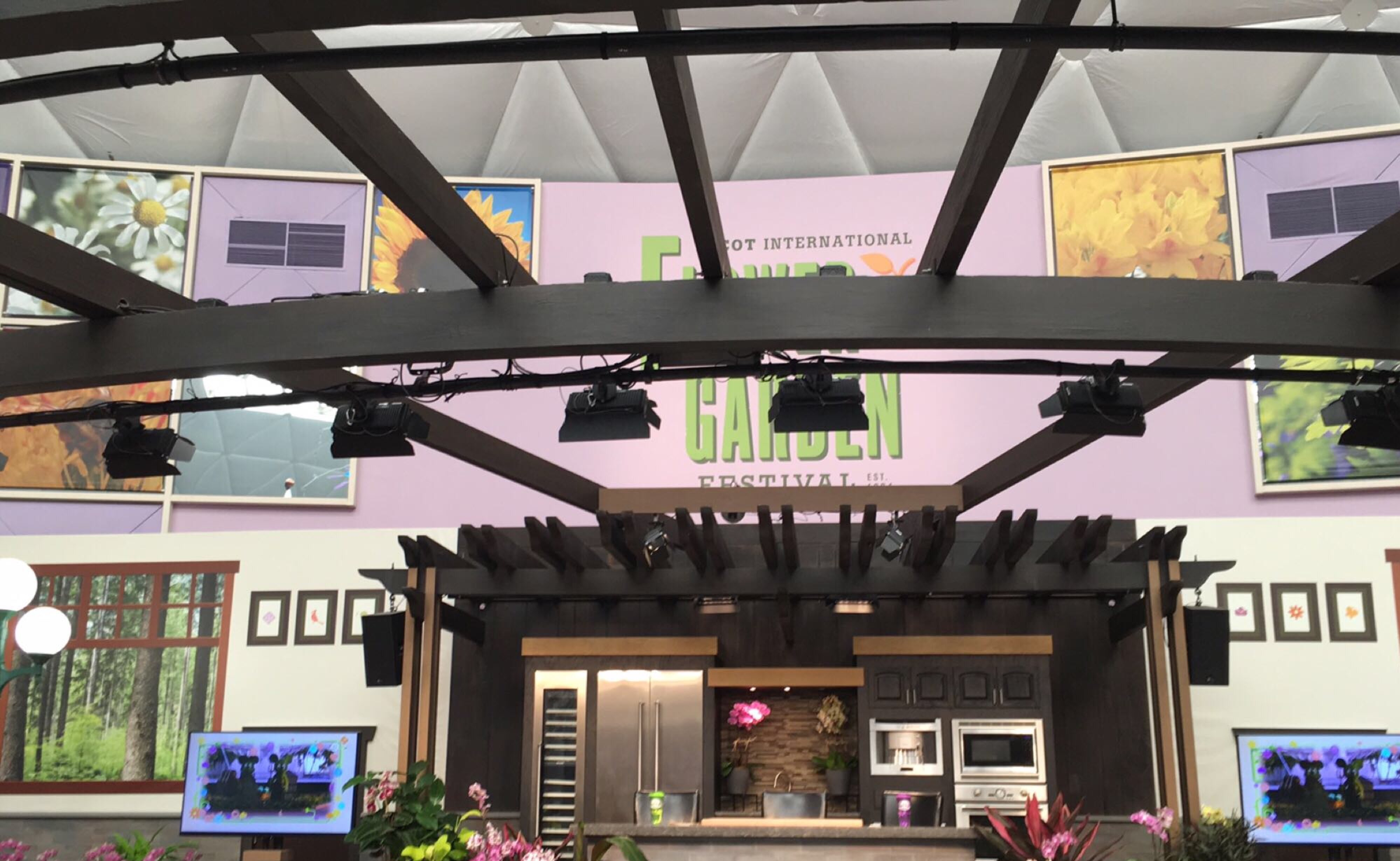
The attraction marquee formerly stood behind where a seminar stage stands now.

Cranium Command's opening was largely overshadowed by its sister attraction in Wonders of Life, the flight simulator thrill ride Body Wars. (Epcot's first) It also happened to have a poor location, tucked away in the back obscured by many other exhibits. The attraction was still well-regarded then and for almost the entire pavilion's lifespan for its humor and fast-paced nature. The "Unofficial Guide to Walt Disney World" book series termed the attraction as "Epcot's hidden gem," stating "Epcot and Walt Disney World could use a lot more of this type of humor." It remains beloved by many Disney fans a decade after its closure. Jerry Rees stated that out of the record-setting 13 theme park attractions he did for Disney, Cranium Command was at the top of the list of the ones he most enjoyed working on, so much so that for years afterward he unsuccessfully tried to get a feature film made shot entirely from a man's point-of-view.

A "Cranium Command" trading pin featuring Buzzy was released in 2012 in tribute of Epcot's 30th anniversary and a Vinylmation twin pack featuring Buzzy and General Knowledge was released in 2014.

The attraction never changed over the course of its 17-year lifespan, aside from the entrance marquee. Upon opening, the entrance advertised the live-action comedians featured in the show. In the mid '90s, it was remodeled to a more theatrical appearance, focusing more on the militaristic and animated portions of the show, featuring General Knowledge and Buzzy.

=== Ties to other Disney projects ===
The show has a number of ties to Disney history. At the grand opening, Jeffrey Katzenberg was impressed by the pre-show and said that it was almost more entertaining than the main show itself. When he got back to Glendale, he found himself needing to assign a new director to Beauty and the Beast (1991) after firing Richard Purdum from the project due to creative differences. Katzenberg thought of Gary Trousdale and Kirk Wise, who were major players on turning the troubled Cranium Command project around in record time, and giving it a sense of humor which Beauty and the Beast needed. Katzenberg hired the duo who in turn ended up making Beauty and the Beast one of the most critically acclaimed animated films of all time, and one of Disney's largest hits.

One of Pete Docter's first jobs was as an animator on Cranium Command. He would later become a director at Pixar. Docter's third feature Inside Out (2015) has a similar premise and he has credited the attraction as an inspiration for that film.

The Walt Disney Animation Studios short Inner Workings (2016) also shares similar themes. Directed by Leo Matsuda, the short "is the story of the internal struggle between a man’s Brain—a pragmatic protector who calculates his every move, and his Heart—a free-spirited adventurer who wants to let loose." Cranium Command, along with the World War II propaganda short Reason and Emotion is cited as one of the main inspirations for the short.

== Status after ride closure ==
After shutting down in 2007, the attraction was left intact but closed to public access. In 2017, Matt Sonswa, an urban explorer, posted an exploration video on YouTube of the show building showing the pre-show, theater, and animatronics to be in good condition. A number of animatronic elements including Buzzy were marked by the Walt Disney archives for preservation.

On February 21, 2019, Disney announced that the Wonders of Life pavilion, including the Cranium Command show building, would be repurposed as a new pavilion entitled Play! Pavilion. However, sometime during the COVID-19 pandemic, the project, along with several other announced enhancements such as the Mary Poppins attraction in United Kingdom and the retooled Spaceship Earth, was put on indefinite hold.

=== Reported theft ===
In December 2018 it was reported that the Buzzy animatronic had been stolen. The theft generated a considerable amount of reactions and speculation.

In May 2019, the Orlando Sentinel reported that the Buzzy animatronic was still missing from the closed attraction. Later that month, former Disney employee Patrick Spikes was arrested in connection to the theft of the Buzzy animatronic character's belongings and selling them on the black market. His cousin Blaytin Taunton was also charged for his role in the theft. In February 2020, after both men made a plea deal of no contest regarding the theft and sale of the belongings and those of Haunted Mansion props, Spikes was sentenced to ten years probation and 250 hours of community service, while Taunton was sentenced to five years probation and 125 hours of community service. Both men were also ordered to pay over $25,000 in restitution and are no longer permitted to set foot on Disney property.

In 2025, the film production studios Bright Sun Films and White Lake Production released the documentary, Stolen Kingdom (directed by Joshua Bailey), which documents the animatronic's theft.

== Attraction facts ==
- Grand opening: October 19, 1989
- Pre-show length: 5:00
- Show length: 17:00
- New show every: 18:00
- Ride system: Audio-Animatronic theater presentation

== See also ==
- Epcot
- Wonders of Life
- List of Epcot attractions
- Inside Out 2015 Pixar film characterizing the emotions inside of a young girl.
