= Players =

Players may refer to:

== Art, entertainment, and media ==
- Players (1979 film), a film starring Ali MacGraw
- Players (2012 film), an Indian Hindi-language film
- Players (2024 film), an American romantic comedy film
- Players (Dicks novel), a novel by Terrance Dicks, based on the television series Doctor Who
- Players (DeLillo novel), a 1977 novel by Don DeLillo
- Players (1997 TV series), a 1997–1998 American crime drama that aired on NBC
- Players (2002 TV program), a 2002–2004 American video game-related television program that aired on G4
- Players (2010 TV series), a 2010 American sitcom that aired on Spike
- Players (2022 TV series), an American mockumentary series that premiered on Paramount+
- "Players" (Angel), a 2003 television episode
- "Players" (Knots Landing), a 1981 television episode
- "Players" (Law & Order: Criminal Intent), a 2007 television episode
- Players (album), an album by Too $hort
- The Club (play), a play by David Williamson, produced in the U.S. as Players
- Players (magazine), an American monthly men's magazine
- "Players" (Coi Leray song), 2022
- "Players" (Yoasobi song), 2025

== Brands, enterprises, and organizations ==
- John Player & Sons or simply Player's, a tobacco company
- Players Ball, an annual gathering of pimps in Chicago, Illinois
- Players International, a casino and gaming service
- Players' League, a 19th-century American baseball league
- Players Software, a brand label used by video-game developer Interceptor Micros
- Players' Theatre, a theatre in London
- The Players (Detroit, Michigan), an American club for actors
- The Players (New York City), or Players Club, an American private social club located in Gramercy Park, Manhattan
- The Players Championship, a wealthy golf tournament since 1974, now near Jacksonville, FL

== See also ==
- Pagliacci (English: Players), an opera by Leoncavallo
- Play (disambiguation)
- Player (disambiguation)
- Players Championship (disambiguation)
- The Players (disambiguation)
