= Playfair =

Playfair may refer to:

- Playfair (surname)
- Playfair (lunar crater)
- Playfair (Martian crater)
- PlayFair, software that removes Apple's FairPlay DRM file encryption, now succeeded by Hymn
- Playfair Project
- TS Playfair, a Canadian sail training vessel
- Playfair's axiom named after John Playfair
- Playfair cipher, a manual encryption technique invented in 1854 by Charles Wheatstone
- Playfair Cricket Annual
- Playfair Race Course, a former horse racing track in Spokane, Washington
- Lyon Playfair Library, now called the Abdus Salam Library, at Imperial College London
- Play Fair!, an HIV/AIDS brochure

== See also ==
- Fair Play (disambiguation)
- Fair (disambiguation)
- Play (disambiguation)
