= Hans and Franz =

- Saturday Night Live characters
- Portrayed by: Dana Carvey and Kevin Nealon

In-universe information
- Gender: Male
- Family: Arnold Schwarzenegger (distant cousin)
- Nationality: Austrian

Hans and Franz are characters in a recurring sketch called "Pumping Up with Hans & Franz" on the television sketch comedy show Saturday Night Live, played by Dana Carvey and Kevin Nealon, respectively.

== Description ==
In the sketch, Carvey and Nealon play a pair of muscle-bound Austrian bodybuilders in the mold of Arnold Schwarzenegger, using padding for fake muscles, drab gray sweatsuits, weight belts, and speaking with Austrian accents. The background of the set includes several life-sized cutouts of Schwarzenegger during his competition years. The sketch's introductory and ending music featured mock Austrian yodeling.

"Pumping Up" primarily consists of Hans and Franz denigrating others for not being strong and as physically fit as they appear to be, striking bodybuilder poses to show off their "muscled" bodies, complete with strained facial expressions. Schwarzenegger made one guest appearance in the sketch (to much applause) in which he ridicules "his cousins" for being "girlie" and weak. Another sketch was done in response to recent sports news, where a "Saturday Night Live editorial" showed Hans and Franz barking back at a recent remark by Jimmy the Greek that African men were more apt to be muscular than European men.

One sketch that did not have the pair in their signature sweatsuits and leather belts was a Halloween episode. Hans and Franz both dressed up as their idol, Arnold Schwarzenegger, with Hans as the titular character from the first Terminator film and Franz as the T-800 from Terminator 2: Judgment Day. The two compared how their Terminators were tougher, then derided others for their "girlie" costumes, including a boy who was dressed as Superman. Rather than hand out high sugar candy, Hans and Franz gave "treats" of vitamin C pills, coconut oil, and bee pollen to encourage kids to stay in shape.

== Development ==
The idea for the characters of Hans and Franz came in 1987 in a Des Moines, Iowa, hotel room while Nealon was watching an Arnold Schwarzenegger television interview during Nealon's and Carvey's first comedy tour. The first sketch in which the characters appear occurred during the season premiere of the 13th season.

== Other appearances ==
After Carvey left the show, the sketch was retired. However, a 1994 episode where Carvey hosted had Hans and Franz appearing as guest commentators as Weekend Update, with the pair mentioning they took some time off and were dismayed at the show's crew for dismantling their set. Franz also considered the Weekend Update sketches were not good since they replaced the past anchor (also played by Kevin Nealon).

A short sketch was filmed for the show's 1999 primetime 25th Anniversary Special which spoofed VH1's Behind the Music specials, but time constraints prevented it from airing. It appeared in a later episode that season. In the sketch, Hans and Franz tell the story of how they were reunited in Hollywood when Franz unsuspectingly had his buttocks "read" by Hans.

Carvey and Nealon, with Hans and Franz accents and mannerisms, portrayed the Right and Left Ventricles of the heart (which pump blood instead of iron) in the "Cranium Command" attraction at the Wonders of Life pavilion at Walt Disney World.

In 2014, the duo appeared in several State Farm commercials with Green Bay Packers quarterback Aaron Rodgers.

== Proposed film ==
Starting in the early 1990s, a Hans and Franz film was in development, with the working title Hans and Franz Go to Hollywood. In a 2010 interview on Conan, Nealon and host Conan O'Brien discussed being holed up in a Santa Monica hotel room for a month with Carvey and Robert Smigel working on the script for what was then intended to be a musical. Carvey discussed the script under the title Hans and Franz: The Girlyman Dilemma during a 2016 interview with Howard Stern. Schwarzenegger expressed an interest and was at one point set to co-produce, but ultimately declined to participate following the poor reception of his self-parodying vehicle Last Action Hero. The disastrous box office performances of the SNL spinoff movies Stuart Saves His Family and It's Pat likely hurt the film's prospects, but Schwarzenegger dropping out proved an insurmountable obstacle.

Scenes from the script were acted out on O'Brien's podcast Conan O'Brien Needs a Friend in May 2023.

== Cultural references ==
NASA's two crawler-transporters—large diesel-powered transport devices used since 1965 to carry heavy launch loads to the launch site, including fully assembled spacecraft from the Apollo, Skylab, and Shuttle eras—are also nicknamed "Hans" (CT-1) and "Franz" (CT-2).

In the popular MMO World of Warcraft, Hans'gar and Franzok are twin brothers in the Blackrock Foundry raid. With a throwback to the Saturday Night Live characters, Franzok can be heard yelling "Hear me now and believe me later!"

In Sesame Street Season 38 Episode 5, Hansel and Gretel introduce themselves and reference the Hans and Franz tagline "We just want to pump...you up!" changed to "We just want to throw...bread crumbs!"

In the Teenage Mutant Ninja Turtles (1987) Cartoon series, Season 4, Episode 9 on Amazon Prime, titled "Planet of the Turtles," the Turtles encounter Hans and Fitz, two turtle wrestlers who speak with Austrian accents and even say "we're going to pump you up" at one point. Later in Season 5, Episode 14 on Amazon Prime, titled "Leonardo Cuts Loose," the Turtles encounter an Arnold Schwarzenegger-like enemy named Wally Airhead who has muscleman henchmen named Hans and Fitz. All of the enemies are very muscular and speak with Austrian accents. Wally says "I'll be back" several times throughout the episode.

== See also ==
- Recurring Saturday Night Live characters and sketches
