= Body Wars =

Defunct motion simulator attraction

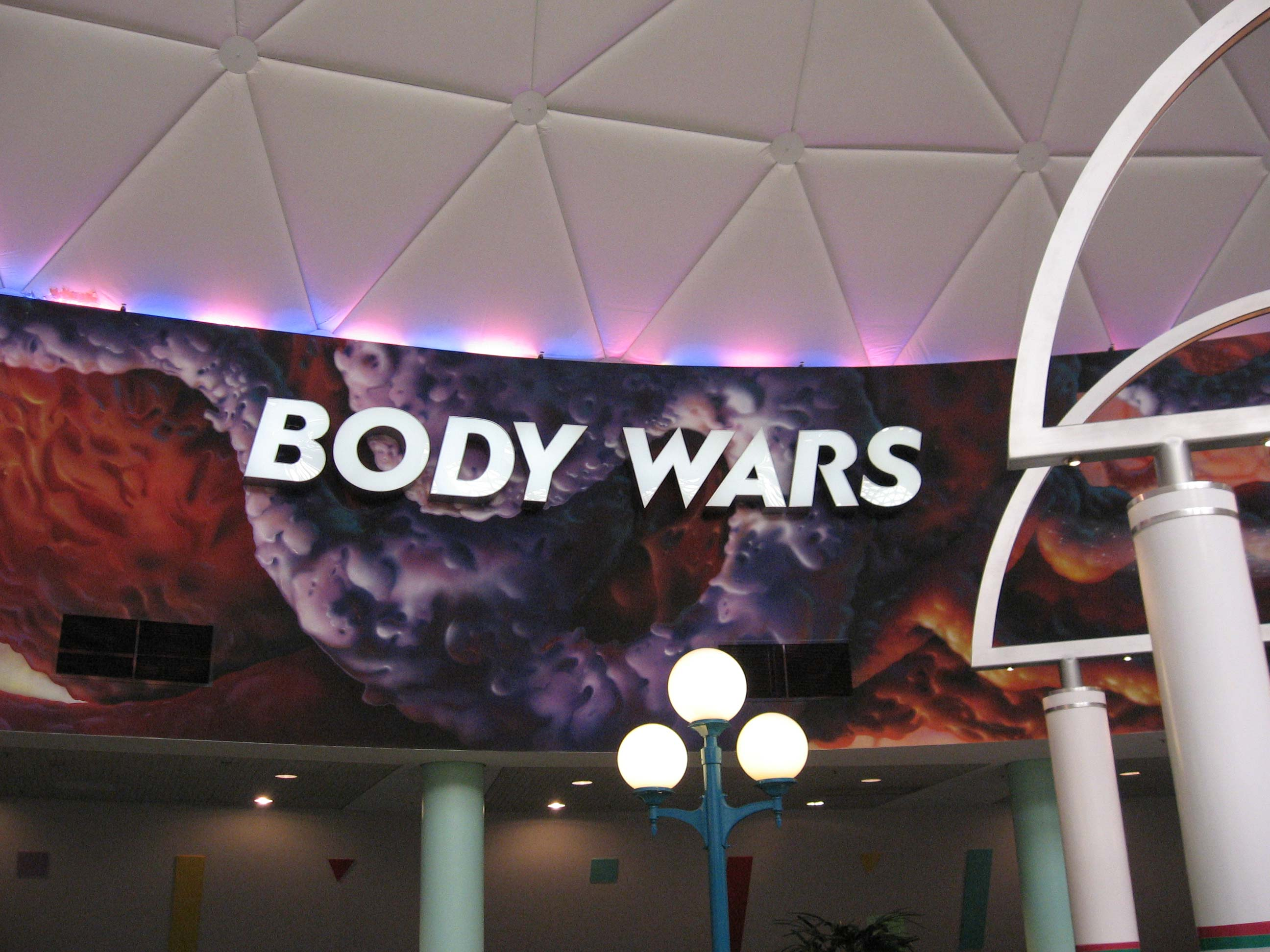

Epcot
- Area: Future World
- Status: Removed
- Opening date: October 19, 1989
- Closing date: January 1, 2007

Ride statistics
- Attraction type: Motion simulator
- Designer: Walt Disney Imagineering
- Theme: Human body
- Music: Leonard Rosenman
- Vehicle type: Motion Simulator
- Vehicles: 4
- Riders per vehicle: 40
- Duration: 7:00
- Height restriction: 40 in (102 cm)
- Producer: Thomas H. Brodek
- Director: Leonard Nimoy
- Special Effects: Industrial Light & Magic
- Sponsor: MetLife (October 19, 1989 – June 2001)
- Must transfer from wheelchair

Body Wars was a motion simulator attraction inside the Wonders of Life pavilion at the Walt Disney World Resort's Epcot. Riders would be taken on a mission by the fictional Miniaturized Exploration Technologies corporation (Stylized as MET) to study the effects of the white blood cells on a splinter inside the left index finger of a volunteer. The attraction used the Advanced Technology Leisure Application Simulator technology previously seen at Disneyland's Star Tours attraction. The ride is no longer in operation along with the other attractions inside the Wonders of Life pavilion, which opened on October 19, 1989, and closed on January 1, 2007.

== History ==
On January 22, 1988, Epcot announced that they would be building a new pavilion in Future World East. It would be called Wonders of Life and be themed to health care. The pavilion would be located between Universe of Energy and Horizons. Wonders of Life would include new restaurants, stores and several attractions. One of these attractions would be a motion simulator ride named Body Wars. The sponsor of Wonders of Life would be MetLife. Construction of the pavilion began in February of that year.

The Wonders of Life pavilion would officially open to the general public on October 19, 1989. Upon opening, Body Wars had a wait time of 90 minutes. Just two months after opening, a similar ride named Star Tours opened at Disney's Hollywood Studios.

Body Wars received a mixed reception from guests, as some praised the thrilling experience, but others complained of motion sickness and nausea since it was considered to be a rough ride and from the subject matter of the attraction.

After MetLife's sponsorship expired in June 2001, Epcot would continue to operate the Wonders of Life pavilion. The popularity of Body Wars began to decline over the years. In 2004, the park announced that the attraction would begin seasonal operation. The entire pavilion would officially close on January 1, 2007.

== Attraction description ==
=== Queue ===
Guests entered the queue on the left side of the Wonders of Life Dome. If the attraction was in high demand, an extended queue would be utilized, decorated with signage and pastel colored shapes lining the walls. This would lead into the main queue, contained within a separate external wing of the building. As guests entered, they were informed via in-queue announcements of details surrounding the fictional MET company. The guests were referred to as "MET Observation Team Members", and would be informed via a preshow shown within the queue of the mission that they would be going on, with another volunteer who had a bruise on his arm, but wasn't shown inside of. The queue would begin with the logo of the MET Company, with various images depicting the company and the inside of the human body. Until 1993, signage would be hung up stating that the company was founded in 2063, as well as their motto "Pioneering the Universe Within". This would lead into the first of two "Dermatopic Purification" stations, before a hallway with in queue TV sets, and the second of two "Dermatopic Purification" stations.

=== Boarding ===
Dr. Cynthia Lair had volunteered to be miniaturized to observe a splinter. The guests were told they would board vehicle Bravo 229 and would be shrunk. Their mission was to meet up with Dr. Lair and bring her out. Captain Braddock would be the guests' pilot.

Guests learned that their "LGS 250"-type probe vehicle weighed approximately 26 tons, but once miniaturized, weighed less than a drop of water.

=== Ride ===
The guests' vehicle, Bravo 229, moved from the bay to the miniaturization room, where technicians focused a "particle reducer" on the ship. The ship and crew mates were shrunk and sent into the subject's body, under his skin. White blood cells were seen on their way to destroy his splinter.

The guests arrived at the splinter, meeting with Dr. Cynthia Lair. She began to take a cell count when she was accidentally pulled into a capillary. Captain Braddock followed Dr. Lair into the vein, entering an unauthorized area. The captain steered Bravo past the heart and into the right ventricle. The guests entered the lungs where Dr. Lair was being attacked by a white blood cell.

Braddock used his lasers to free Dr. Lair. By now, the ship was very low on power. Dr. Lair suggested that they use the brain's energy to recharge the ship. Passing the heart's left atrium, the ship went through the artery to get to the brain. A neuron contacted the ship, allowing it to regain power and de-miniaturize outside of the subject's body. As the subject sits up, Mission Control congratulates Braddock, Lair, and the guests on pulling off the most spectacular mission in the history of MET.

== Attraction facts ==
- Cast:
  - Jenifer Lewis as Ride Queue Instructional Video Announcer (uncredited)
  - Tim Matheson as Captain Braddock
  - Dakin Matthews as Mission Control
  - Elisabeth Shue as Dr. Cynthia Lair
  - Dayna Beilenson as Scientist (uncredited)
  - David Hayter as Subject in Main Show (uncredited)
- Vehicle names: (all bays and vehicles were fictional except for Bravo 229)
  - Bay #1: "Zulu 174"
  - Bay #2: "Bravo 229"
  - Bay #3: "Sierra 657" and "Foxtrot 817"
  - Bay #4: "Charlie 218"

Used same ATLAS Technology as Star Tours.

== Current status ==
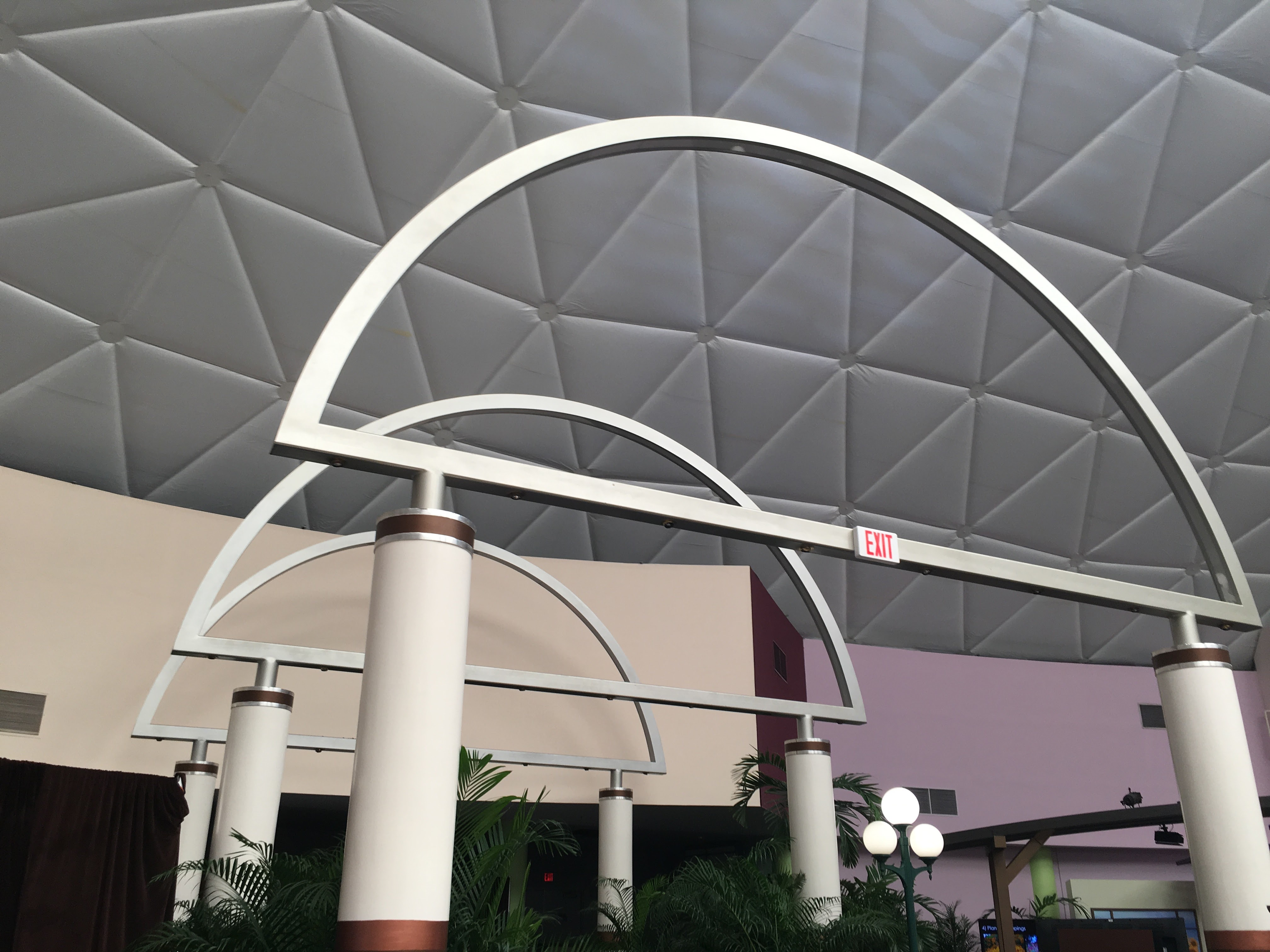
The former Body Wars entrance seen in March 2017.

As of November 2014, the four simulators have been dismantled and removed from the ride building. The queue is still intact, but most of the lighting and electronic equipment has been removed. The show building is currently used for storage for the Epcot Food & Wine Festival, along with the Flower & Garden Festival. As of November 2016, the queue is being slowly dismantled while few remnants remain. The pavilion is currently being transformed into the new Play! pavilion (construction is under way). The exit area has had the same treatment, with all signage removed. Red archive tags have been applied to the beginning MET Sign, and to the Body Wars safety information sign near the exit.

On February 21, 2019, it was announced that the new Play! Pavilion would be replacing the entire Wonders of Life pavilion, including the ride. What will happen to Body Wars during the transformation is currently unknown. As of 2025 however, there has been no report about the Play! pavilion.

== See also ==
- Epcot attraction and entertainment history
- Wonders of Life
- Incidents at Walt Disney World
- Advanced Technology Leisure Application Simulator - the technology underlying Body Wars.
- Fantastic Voyage
