= Get Right (disambiguation) =

"Get Right" is a song by Jennifer Lopez from her 2005 album Rebirth.

Get Right may also refer to:

== Music ==
- "Get Right", a song by Jimmy Eat World from Integrity Blues
- Get Right, a 2013 album by The Soft White Sixties
- "Get Right", a song by Young Jeezy from his 2012 mixtape It's tha World
- "Get Right", a song by Pearl Jam from the 2002 album Riot Act
- "Get Right", a song by Bobby Parker
- "Get Right", a 2013 song by Miles Kane
- "Get Right", a 1967 song by The Players

== Other uses ==
- Christopher "GeT_RiGhT" Alesund, Swedish professional Counter-Strike player
- GetRight, a shareware download manager

== See also ==
- Get Right with the Man, a 2005 album by Van Zant
