= Plaid =

Plaid (/plæd/) may refer to:

== Fabric ==
- A synonym for tartan cloth, primarily in North American English
- Full plaid, a cloth blanket or mantle, made with a tartan or checked pattern, wrapped around the waist, cast over the shoulder and fastened at the front
- Fly plaid, a smaller tartan-cloth mantle, worn pinned to the left shoulder
- Belted plaid or "great kilt", an earlier form of the kilt, it was a large plaid (blanket) pleated by hand and belted around the waist
  - Arisaid, ladieswear equivalent of the belted plaid, worn until the 18th century as a large shawl or wrapped into a dress; in later times, shrank to a smaller plaid worn as a shoulder or head shawl
- Maud (plaid) or Lowland plaid, a cloth mantle made in a small black-and-white chequered pattern
- A plaid (tartan) shirt, typically of flannel and worn during the winter
- A plaid (tartan) jacket, often made of Mackinaw cloth
- Windowpane plaid, a way of crossing warp and weft to create a pattern

== Others ==
- Plaid (album), 1992, by guitarist Blues Saraceno
- Plaid (band), a British electronic music duo, taking their name from the Welsh word for party
- Plaid Cymru, a political party in Wales
- Plaid Inc., a financial technology company specializing in bank login verification
- Plaid Loch, freshwater lake in East Ayrshire, Scotland, UK
- Plaid speed, a faster-than-light speed from the movie Spaceballs
- Plaid, branding for the high-performance versions of the Tesla Model S and Tesla Model X

== See also ==
- Plad, an unincorporated community in Dallas County, Missouri
- Played (disambiguation)
- Tartan (disambiguation)
