= Reason and Emotion =

1943 American short film

- Title card
- Directed by: Bill Roberts
- Story by: Joe Grant; Dick Huemer
- Produced by: Walt Disney
- Starring: Frank Graham; Sarah Selby; Mary Lennon; Harry E. Lang; Ward Kimball
- Music by: Oliver Wallace
- Animation by: Ollie Johnston; Milt Kahl; Ward Kimball; Fred Moore; Bill Tytla
- Color process: Technicolor
- Production company: Walt Disney Productions
- Distributed by: RKO Radio Pictures
- Release date: August 28, 1943
- Running time: 8 minutes

Reason and Emotion is a World War II-era short film by Walt Disney Productions, released on August 28, 1943, by RKO Radio Pictures. The eight-minute short, produced for the United States government as wartime propaganda, discusses the importance of not letting emotion overrun reason, with examples from both civilian and wartime life. It was nominated for the 1943 Academy Award for Best Animated Short Film, losing to the Tom and Jerry short The Yankee Doodle Mouse.

The short has been cited as an influence on the former Epcot attraction Cranium Command, as well as the Pixar series Inside Out.

== Plot ==
A narrator introduces the concepts of reason and emotion, which "wage a ceaseless battle for mastery" in the human mind. The narrator demonstrates by introducing Junior, a baby who has not yet developed the capacity for reason. As such, he is fully controlled by Emotion, depicted as a caveman residing in Junior's brain cavity. Emotion's reckless adventure-seeking leads Junior to pull a cat's tail and fall down a flight of stairs. Shortly afterwards, Emotion is joined by Reason, a bespectacled gentleman, who states that such accidents would never have happened had he been present.

Years pass, and Junior grows up to be an average man. Reason has taken control of Junior's mind, driving in a manner similar to a car, with Emotion sitting in the rear. When Junior passes an attractive woman, Emotion knocks Reason out and takes control to flirt with her, resulting in Junior getting a slap to the face. The narrator shows a similar scenario in the woman's mind: when at a restaurant, Emotion takes control and causes the woman to overeat, ruining her figure.

The narrator moves on to discuss the necessity of managing emotion in the strenuous times of World War II. A man who closely follows the news finds himself surrounded by sensationalism, rumors, and enemy propaganda, leading his own Reason and Emotion to fight amongst themselves over whether the war is still winnable. When Emotion begins to get the upper hand, the narrator shouts him down, stating that letting Emotion win will only benefit the Axis. To demonstrate, the film moves on to the mind of a Nazi soldier watching a speech by Adolf Hitler, whose manipulation of Emotion suppresses Reason and brings destruction across Europe.

The narrator encourages Reason to take control of thinking and Emotion to provide productive, patriotic support for the Allied cause. The short closes with a shot of Reason and Emotion, both dressed in pilot gear, in the head of an Allied pilot.

== Production ==
Reason and Emotion was directed by Bill Roberts, with animation by Ward Kimball and Ollie Johnston, among others. BlogofDeath explains: "During World War II, [Joe] Grant and animator Dick Huemer created gags and designs for many of Disney's patriotic-themed cartoons", including this film.

In an August 1942 issue, LIFE magazine's "Walt Disney Goes to War" showed seven preliminary drawings for Reason and Emotion, and wrote: "Here are sketches from a new Disney short now being filmed. Like several of his short subjects, it is based on an idea offered by the U.S. Government, but done entirely at Disney's expense and released by him through RKO. It is presented as straight entertainment with wartime appeal. Disney tackles here the difficult subject of Reason and Emotion and brings it off brilliantly. Looking with X-ray eyes into human heads, he draws a humorously exaggerated portrait of Reason as a bespectacled professor, and Emotion as a cave man. When emotion runs wild, especially in the head of a Nazi, there is hell to pay. But Disney takes care to show that Emotion in its place is a good thing."

== Release ==
The film was theatrically released on August 28, 1943.

In 1962, an abbreviated version of the short was used in the Walt Disney's Wonderful World of Color episode "Ducking Disaster with Donald Duck". All direct references to World War II were removed, and the original narrator was replaced with Ludwig Von Drake (played by Paul Frees).

In 2004, the short was included in Walt Disney on the Front Lines, a DVD collection of World War II-era Disney shorts.

== Critical reception ==
IndieWire wrote: "Reason and Emotion is exactly the kind of thing that sticks in your mind because it is strange, a wartime film that used a visual metaphor to make a case about Americans keeping their calm during WWII."

== Additional media appearances ==
The cartoon characters "Reason" and "Emotion" also appear in the Upjohn Company's educational short animated feature, "Understanding Alcohol Use and Abuse", which was produced by Walt Disney Productions in 1979. This feature was the final installment of Upjohn's Triangle of Health series.

== External sources ==
- Openculture.com
- Ptsnob.com
