= The Making of Me =

1989 film directed by Glenn Gordon Caron

- Directed by: Glenn Gordon Caron
- Written by: Glenn Gordon Caron
- Produced by: Jay Daniel
- Starring: Martin Short
- Music by: Bruce Broughton
- Release date: October 30, 1989
- Running time: 16:00
- Country: United States
- Language: English

The Making of Me

Epcot
- Area: Future World
- Status: Closed
- Opening date: October 30, 1989
- Closing date: January 1, 2007
- Replaced by: Various movies

Ride statistics
- Attraction type: Theater
- Wheelchair accessible
- Assistive listening available

The Making of Me was a 1989 film about conception and birth directed by Glenn Gordon Caron and starring Martin Short. It was shown in the Wonders of Life pavilion at Walt Disney World Resort's Epcot when the pavilion was open. After closing in 2007, through 2018, the theater remained open during the International Food & Wine Festival; however, the film being shown was about food.

== Description ==
Martin Short tells the story about how we are born, by explaining how his parents met during the course of their lives - at a high school dance, getting married, on their honeymoon, and having their first child.

The film also explains the process of fertilization between sperm and egg cells in an animated segment that lasts about 1 minute and 30 seconds, as well as fetal development by using imagery taken by Lennart Nilsson (previously appeared in Nova's "Miracle of Life".)

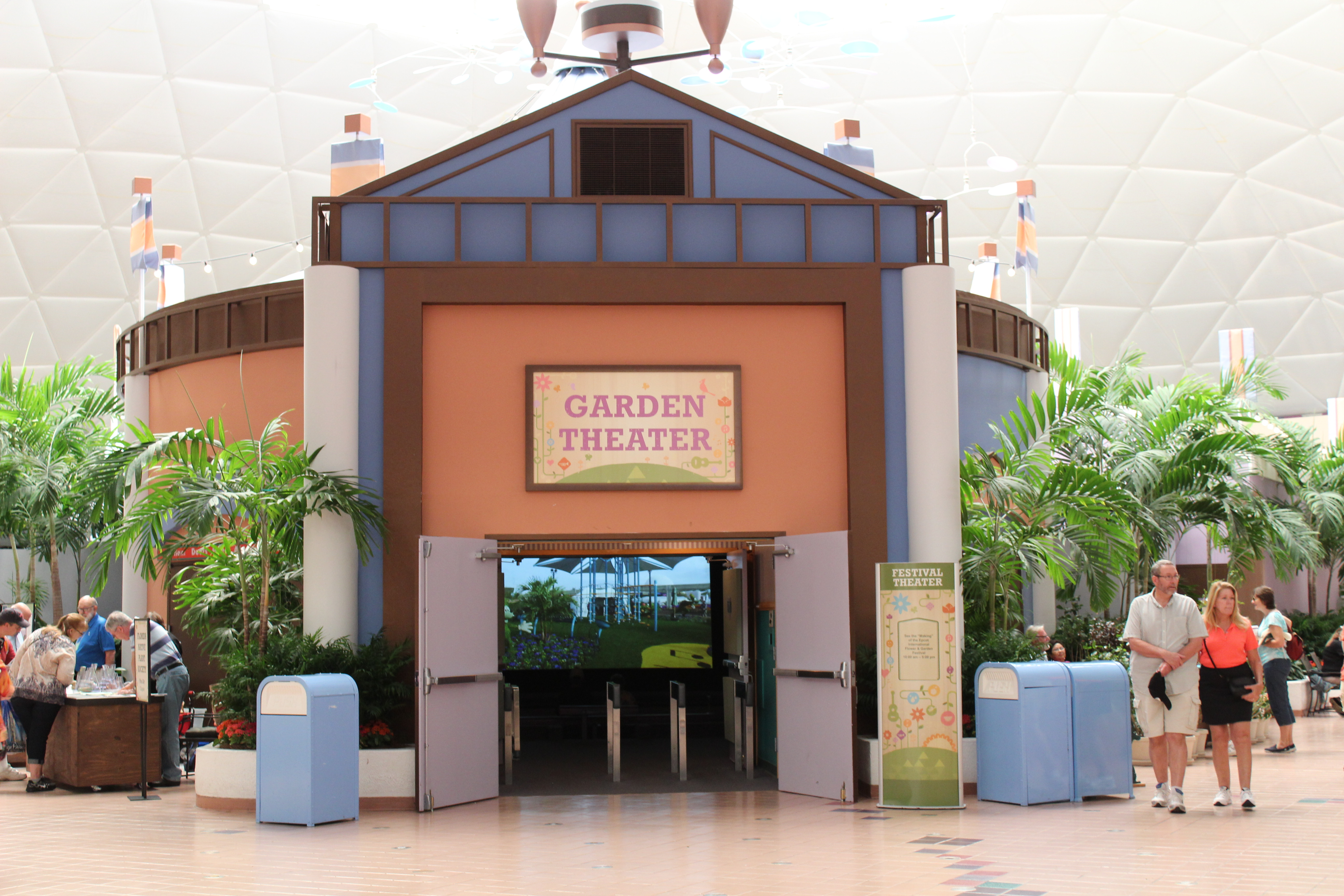
The Making of Me Theatre during the Flower and Garden Festival

The attraction closed along with the rest of the pavilion on January 1, 2007. During the 2007 Epcot Food & Wine Festival, the marquee located outside the theater was covered by a curtain. During 2008, it was once again visible, but the film did not show.

From 2008 through 2018, the theater had been used to screen "Seasons of the Vine", a film previously shown at Disney California Adventure, during the Food and Wine Festival. During the Flower and Garden Festival, the theater was called The Garden Theatre.

== Background ==
According to producers, the film was "...somewhat a departure for a Disney attraction", and mentions that the film "may elicit controversy" in regards to the issue of abortion, the intent was "to not walk into the teeth of the (abortion) issue."

Given that birth and conception is considered a sensitive issue among families, an advisory sign was placed near the entrance to the theater, in order to advise parents to decide whether the film is suitable for their children.

== See also ==
- Epcot attraction and entertainment history
- Wonders of Life
