= Wonders of Life =

Former pavilion in Future World at Epcot

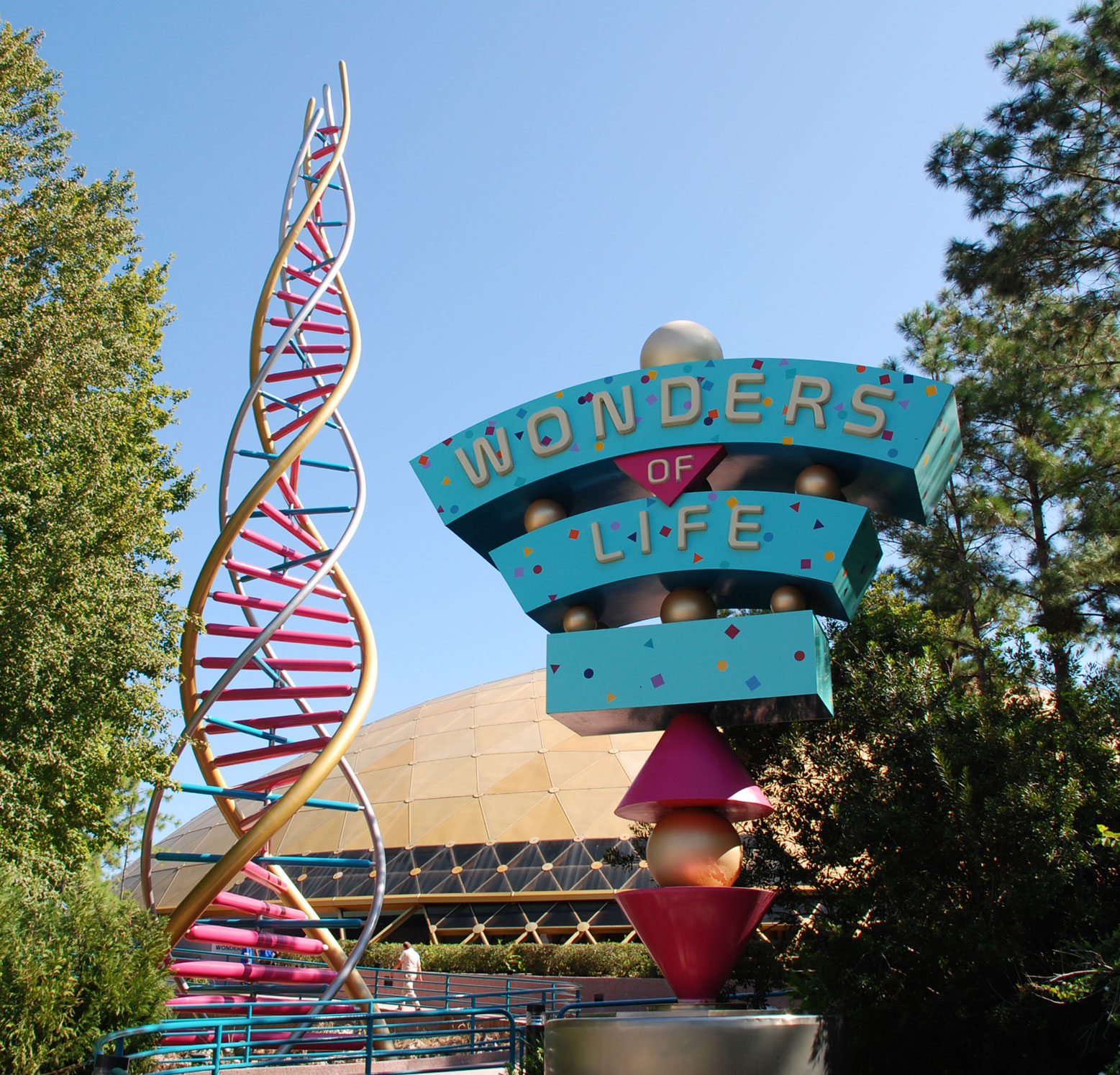

Epcot
- Area: Future World
- Status: Closed
- Cost: US $100 million
- Opening date: October 19, 1989
- Closing date: January 1, 2007
- Replaced by: Play! Pavilion (Cancelled)

Ride statistics
- Attraction type: Simulator ride (Body Wars); Theater (Cranium Command, The Making of Me, Goofy About Health); Exhibits (Fitness Fairgrounds & Frontiers of Medicine)
- Designer: Walt Disney Imagineering
- Theme: Life, body, health, and fitness
- Height: 75 ft (23 m)
- Site area: 100,000 sq ft (9,300 m^{2})
- Geodesic dome size: 65 ft (20 m) high and 250 ft (76 m) in diameter
- Sponsor: MetLife (1989–2001); None (2001–2007)

The Wonders of Life pavilion was an attraction at Epcot at Walt Disney World in Lake Buena Vista, Florida. Located inside a golden colored dome between Mission: SPACE (formerly Horizons) and Guardians of the Galaxy: Cosmic Rewind (formerly Universe of Energy), it was devoted to health care, focusing on the human body, physical fitness, medicine and nutrition. Attractions included Body Wars and Cranium Command. It opened on October 19, 1989, and closed on January 1, 2007. From 2007 to 2018, the Pavilion acted as EPCOT's Festival Center. The original attractions within the building have been closed and partially removed.

In February 2019, it was announced that a new Play! Pavilion would be built in the domed show building formerly occupied by Wonders of Life. It was originally scheduled to open in time for Walt Disney World's 50th anniversary in 2021, but due to the COVID-19 pandemic, the pavilion's opening date was delayed indefinitely. In early 2023, mention of the upcoming Play! Pavilion was removed from park maps.

== History ==
The idea of a pavilion devoted to health and fitness dates back to the original concept of the EPCOT Center theme park, but no corporate sponsor could be found to cover the costs. It was not until MetLife signed on that the pavilion was finally constructed, and it featured two main attractions: Cranium Command and Body Wars, the first thrill ride located in EPCOT. Also featured was a theater (home to The Making of Me), restaurant and interactive attractions that evolved around the idea of health and wellness.

The Wonders of Life pavilion was officially announced on January 22, 1988, with construction beginning the following month. It opened to the general public on October 19, 1989.

MetLife ended its sponsorship in June 2001, which led to the gradual decline of the pavilion. On January 4, 2004, Disney made the decision to make it seasonal operation only. It reopened when the park was projected to hit near capacity during the high spring months and Christmas season. Its most recent operational phase was November 26, 2006, through January 1, 2007. In 2007, the pavilion closed permanently, with no official reason given. While it is not operational to the public, it is still commonly used for private and corporate events.

The pavilion then operated seasonally as the festival center for the Epcot International Flower and Garden Festival and the Epcot International Food & Wine Festival. The pavilion hosted seminars, videos, presentations, and more. It was used as a central merchandise location during the two festivals as well. The theater that was used for The Making of Me was used for various movies and presentations during festival events. Beginning in 2007, temporary walls were placed around the existing attractions during the festival. The "Body Wars" sign was removed in 2008, replaced by a temporary Garden Town sign while the imprints from the original marquee were painted over. By 2009, significant portions of the Body Wars attraction had been removed. The "Celebrate the Joy of Life" sign was removed following in 2009, while most of the exhibits left were removed. The pavilion also received a paint job inside using mute colors such as white and light green. On September 11, 2012, Walt Disney Imagineering filed a notice of commencement with the Orange County Comptroller's office indicating the intentions for a "selective demolition" to take place at the pavilion. As of November 2014, the Body Wars ride simulators have been dismantled. The queue still exists, but most of the props and other electronics have been removed. As of 2017, the Cranium Command queue and pre-show was partially dismantled. However, the theater, including the lighting, seats, and staging area, remains intact.

Buzzy, the audio-animatronic from Cranium Command, was reported as stolen in 2018. Cast member Patrick Spikes and his cousin Blaytin Tauton were arrested in 2019 for their connection to the theft. A documentary detailing Buzzy's disappearance titled Stolen Kingdom was released in 2025.

In February 2019, it was announced that a new interactive pavilion would be built in the dome formerly occupied by Wonders of Life. This project was a part of a larger overhaul of Epcot, which would include a redesign of the main entrance, as well as new attractions such as Guardians of the Galaxy: Cosmic Rewind. Many of these developments, including Play! Pavilion, were originally scheduled to open in time for Walt Disney World's 50th anniversary in 2021. However, construction was delayed due to the COVID-19 pandemic. In January 2023, Disney stated that they are reevaluating the concept, and removed all mention of the Play! Pavilion from park maps. The reimagining of Epcot concluded in Summer 2024 with the opening of CommuniCore Hall.

== Attractions ==
- Cranium Command - A theater show with audio-animatronic actors and a movie. The show explained the functions of the brain and its interaction with the human body.
- Frontiers of Medicine - Listen to stories about medicine and the brain on small televisions.
- Body Wars - A motion simulator ride taking guests on a Fantastic Voyage-like trip through the heart, lungs, and brain. The film shown was directed by Leonard Nimoy, and starred actors Tim Matheson, Elisabeth Shue, and Dakin Matthews. Often compared to Star Tours at Disney's Hollywood Studios and Disneyland as its counterpart.
- Coach's Corner - Guests can swing a bat while a professional player gives tips.
- Goofy About Health - A multimedia show about healthy living hosted by Goofy, using clips from his cartoons.
- Fitness Fairgrounds - Tested guests' athletic abilities
- Sensory Funhouse - An interactive playground which tested guest's sensory abilities, including an Ames room
  - Audio Antics - A listening skill game which involved regular sounds and sounds that were out of place, which the listener had to figure out.
- The Making of Me - A short movie about birth and life starring Martin Short.
- Wonder Cycles - Stationary bicycles with a television attached. The faster riders pedaled, the faster the video played. The bicycles would take the rider on a short tour, with a selection of:
  - 100th Anniversary Rose Parade Pasadena, California
  - Disneyland in California - The rider could see that day's park patrons watching the camera pass and moving out of the way for the operator.
  - Take a Little Ride: Microworld Bigtown, U.S.A.

=== Live entertainment ===
- Anacomical Players - A live show that featured improvisational skits on health and nutrition.

=== Shops ===
- Well and Goods Limited

=== Food services ===
- Pure & Simple

== Gallery ==
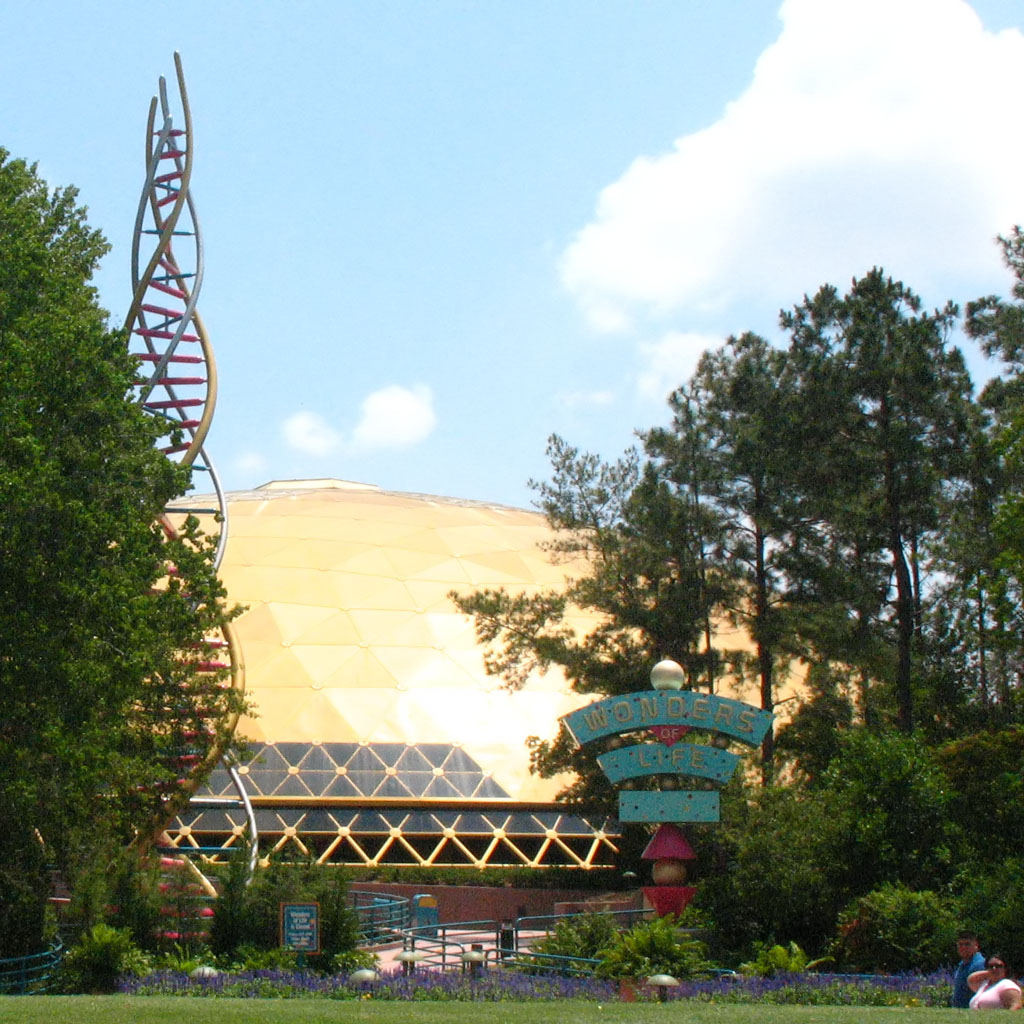

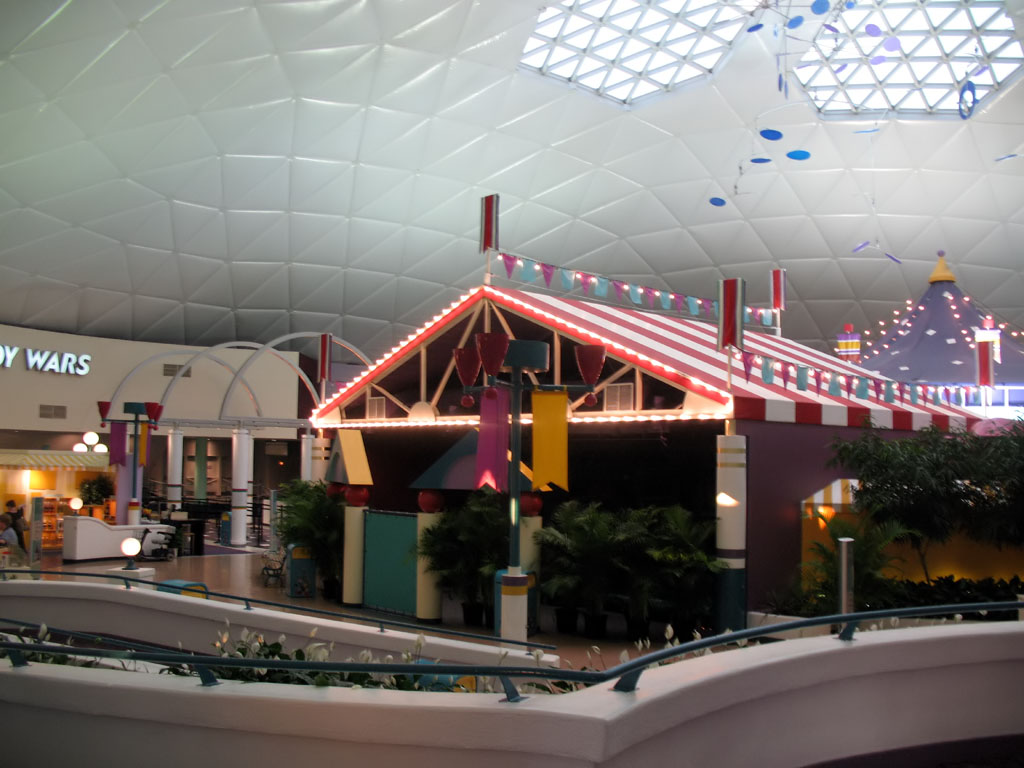

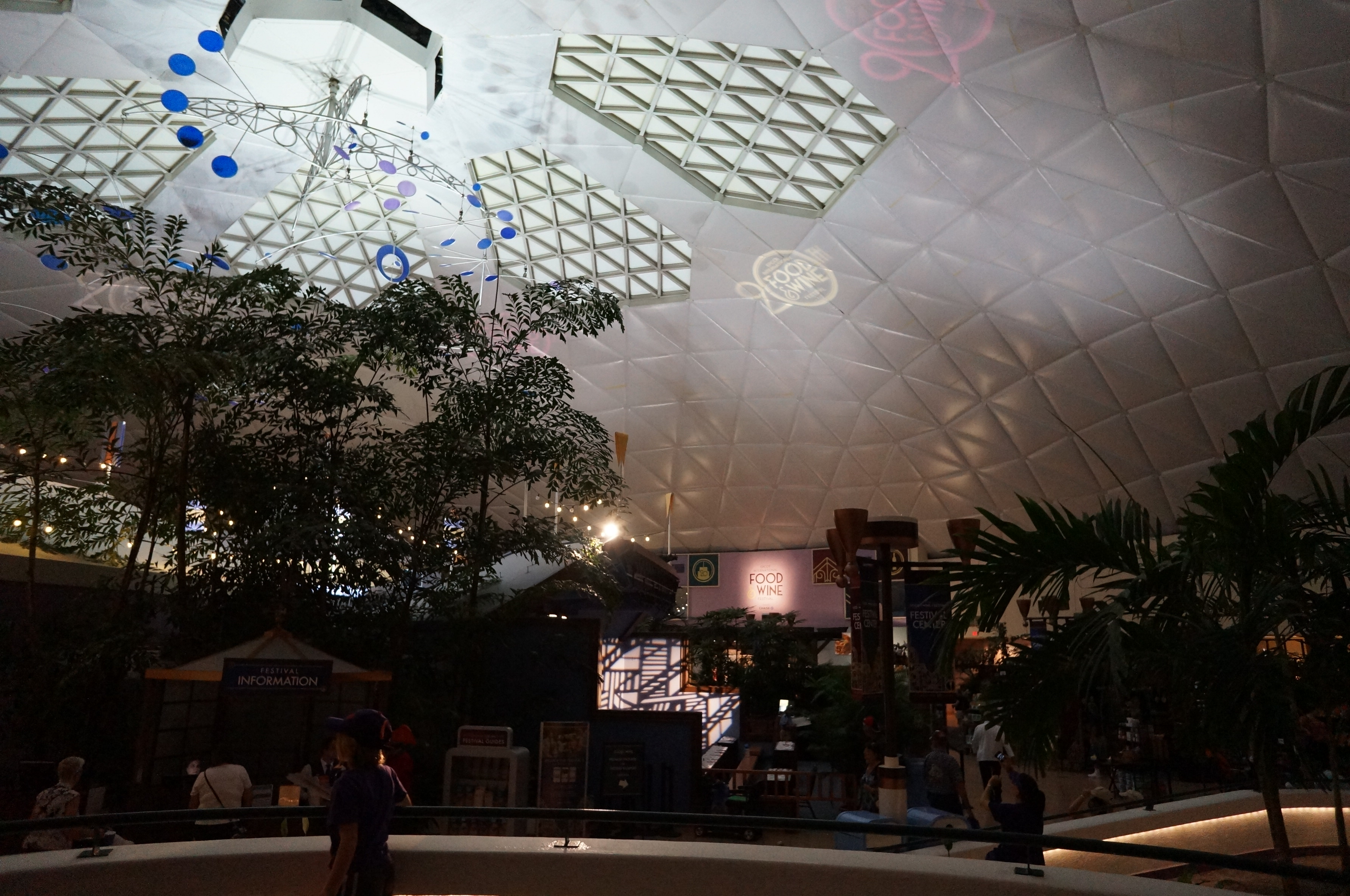

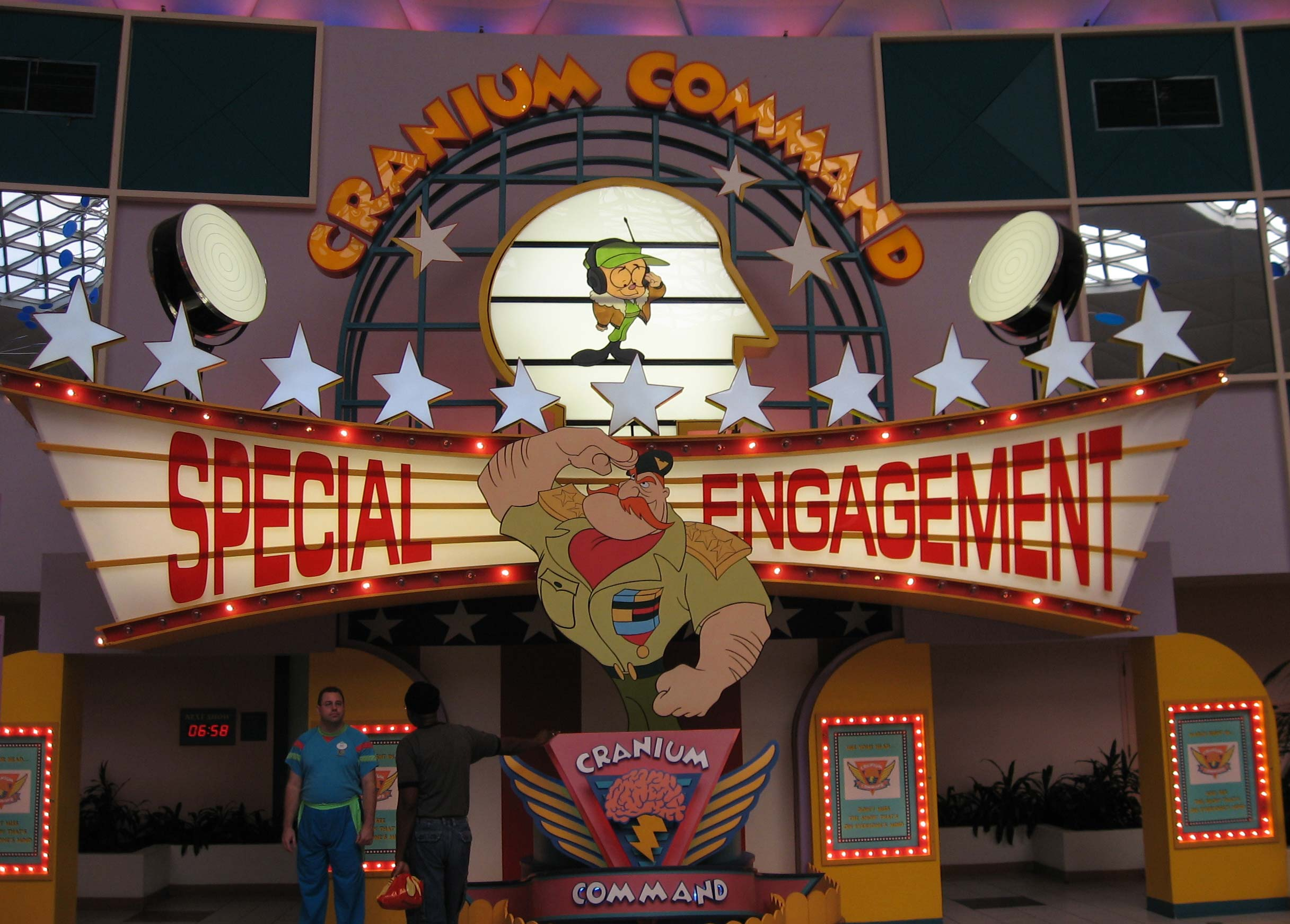

== See also ==
- Epcot
- Epcot attraction and entertainment history
