= Tartan (disambiguation) =

Tartan is a pattern of textile also known as plaid (especially in North American English), often associated with Scotland.

Tartan may also refer to:

- Tartan, a metonym standing in for 'Scottish' (as in "tartan politics", "tartan television", "tartan humour", etc.)
- Tartan (Assyrian), the Assyrian term for a military commander-in-chief
- Tartan, tartane, or tartana, a type of ship
- Tartans, students and sports teams of Carnegie Mellon University
  - Carnegie Mellon Tartans football
- The Tartan (Carnegie Mellon University), a student newspaper
- The Tartan (Radford University), a student newspaper
- The Tartans, a Jamaican reggae band
- FBgn0010452 also known as tartan, trn, or CG11280, a gene partly responsible for eye development in Drosophila melanogaster fruit flies; capitalized Tartan or Trn refers to a protein controlled by this gene.
- Sillitoe tartan, the chequered pattern (dicing, not actually a tartan) used often on police vehicles and headgear
- Tartan Army, fans of Scotland's national football team
- Tartan Films, a US and UK film-distribution company
- Tartan Laboratories, an American software company later known as Tartan, Inc.
- Tartan Marine, a boat building company
- Tartan Noir, a form of crime fiction particular to Scotland and Scottish writers
- Tartan Senior High School, in Oakdale, Minnesota
- Tartan Track, a synthetic track surface for athletics, manufactured by 3M
- Tartan Turf, an artificial grass for sports, manufactured by 3M

== See also ==
- Tiretaine or tiretane, old terms for linsey-woolsey, a type of cloth made from linen and wool
- Tartarin or tartaryn (rarely tartyn), old terms for tartarium or Tartar cloth, elaborate textiles imported to Europe from Central and East Asia in the medieval period
- Tarlatan, a very open-weave muslin cloth similar to cheesecloth
- Plaid (disambiguation)
