= Play, The Videogames World =

European exhibition on video games

Coordinates: 41°53′58″N 12°29′24″E

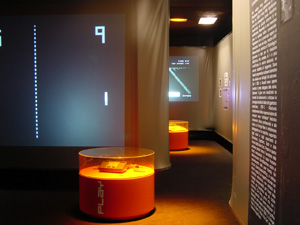
The first area of the exhibition

Play, The Videogame World was the first European exhibition on videogames. It was held at Palazzo delle Esposizioni, one of the main contemporary art museums in Rome - Italy, from 24 April to 10 July 2002. The exhibition was visited by over 50,000 people.

== The exhibition ==
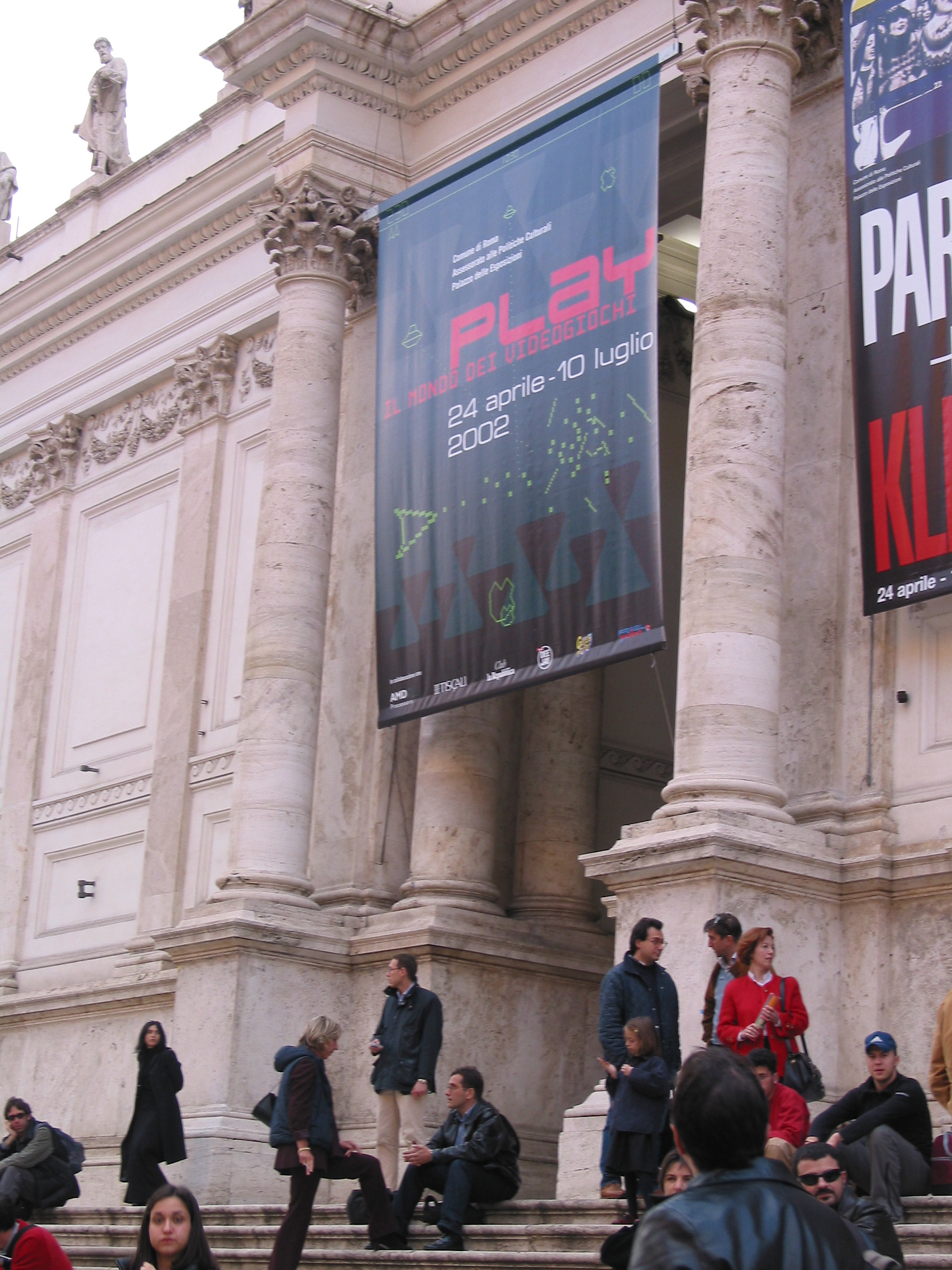
Palazzo delle Esposizioni in Rome

Displayed on 1300 square meters, it showed over 300 videogames starting from the 1961 Space War to the latest hits for PC, PlayStation 2, Xbox and GameCube. There were also more than 40 different consoles, including the Magnavox Odyssey, the Vectrex, the TurboGrafx-16, and over 50 handheld consoles from the 1970s to nowadays.

Play tried to show the evolution of video games not only from a technical point of view, but also the interactions between them and society. This was illustrated through interviews with important game designers such as Shigeru Miyamoto, Hideo Kojima, Tetsuya Mizuguchi and the biographies of many other leading personalities in the games industry, through the advertisement campaigns, and though highlighting the relationships between games and sports, politics, Hollywood and the military industries.

The exhibition was mainly organised in a chronological order and divided in five main areas. The first area went from the beginnings of video games till the raise of Nintendo, whose playing cards dated 1900 and few electrical toys from the 50s where shown. The second area was characterized by the 16-bit consoles. The third one was dedicated to PlayStation, Sega Mega Drive, Nintendo 64 and other minor consoles such as Atari Jaguar, whilst the fourth one was on PC games, from the first Id Software productions to the recent MMORPGs (massively-multiplayer online role-playing games). The last area was focused on PlayStation 2, Xbox and GameCube.

== Curators ==
The curators of play were Jaime D’Alessandro, journalist of La Repubblica, and Maria Grazia Tolomeo, with the collaboration of Andrea Cuneo, Francesco Fondi, Diego Malara, Sergio Pennacchini. The exhibition design was done by Studio Ma0.

Play couldn't have been done without Luisa Ammaniti, marketing manager at Palazzo delle Esposizioni.
