= The Players (Detroit) =

- U.S. National Register of Historic Places
- Michigan State Historic Site
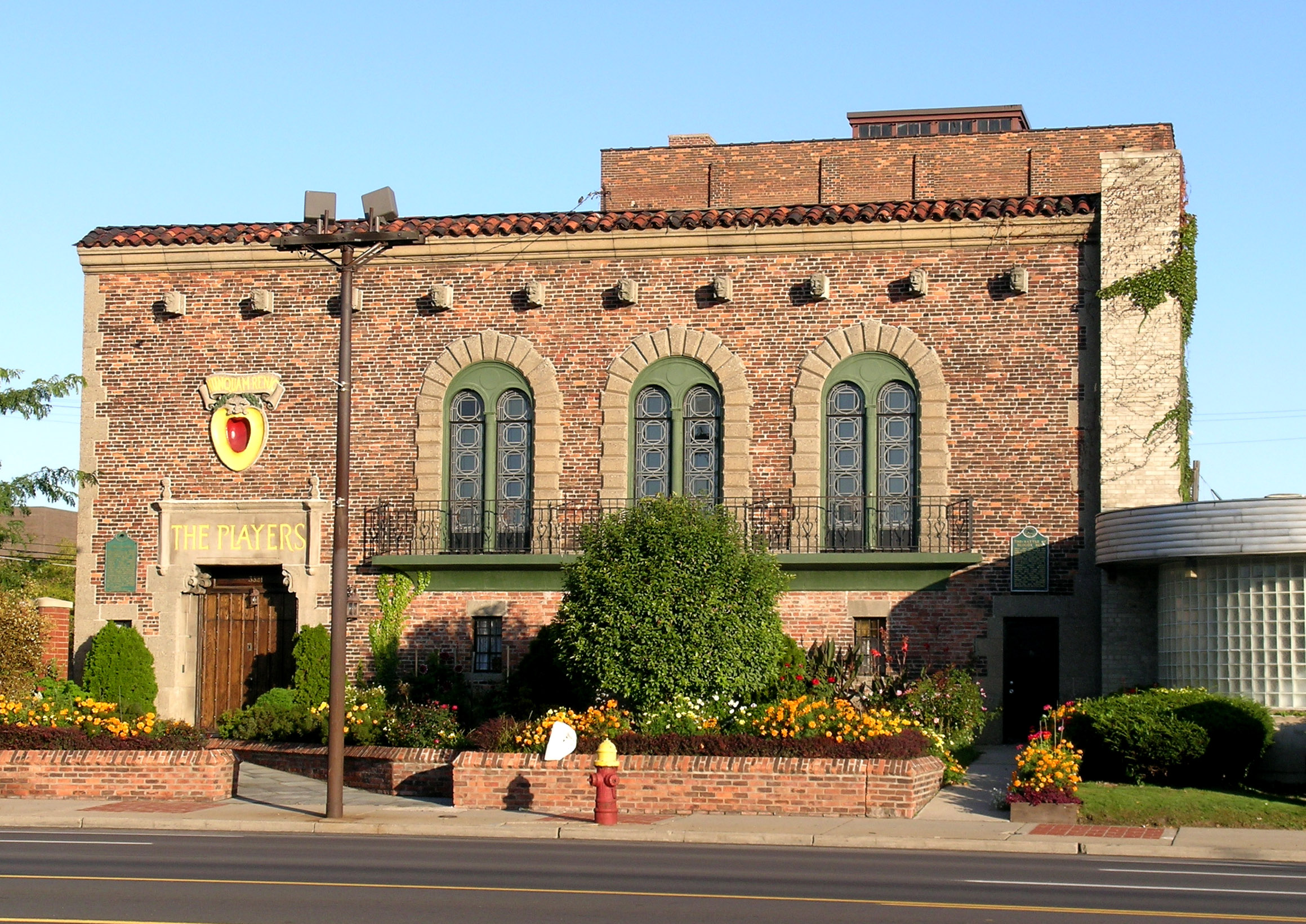

- Location within Michigan Location within the United States
- Interactive map
- Location: 3321 East Jefferson Avenue; Detroit, Michigan
- Coordinates: 42°20′32″N 83°0′51″W
- Built: 1925
- Architect: William E. Kapp; Smith, Hinchman & Grylls
- Architectural style: Florentine Renaissance, Arts and Crafts, Art Deco (murals)
- NRHP reference No.: 87000920

Significant dates
- Added to NRHP: June 12, 1987
- Designated MSHS: August 22, 1975

The Players is a clubhouse and theatre located at 3321 East Jefferson Avenue in Detroit, Michigan. It was designated a Michigan State Historic Site in 1985 and listed on the National Register of Historic Places in 1987.

== History ==
The Players Club of Detroit was founded in 1911 by a group of local Detroit businessmen as an institution to encourage amateur theater. From the beginning, it was a strictly male club. For the first 15 years of the club's existence, they were forced to perform in different venues each month, including the Detroit Athletic Club, the University Club and the Twentieth Century Club.

A number of the financial elite of early 20th century Detroit were members of the Players, including Henry Joy, Truman Newberry, James Couzens, and Lawrence Fisher. The club continued as a successful and popular gentleman's club until the 1970s, when membership began to drop. However, the club experienced a renaissance in the 1990s, and as of 2005 there were 174 members.

== Architecture ==
In 1925, Players Club member William E. Kapp designed a building to permanently house the club. Kapp was with the firm Smith, Hinchman & Grylls. at a cost of $75,000. The building was two stories, elaborately decorated, and constructed of what was, at the time, a novel material: cinder blocks. The exterior of the club is designed in a Florentine Renaissance style. The roof is tile, and the façade boasts a triple round arch bay framed by a wrought iron balcony. Ten sculpted gargoyles were created by Corrado Parducci for the façade. Below the west entrance pavilion the legend "The Players" is traced in limestone.

The building includes a four-story high stage, as well as a kitchen, dressing rooms, basement storage and prop rooms, and a formal meeting room on the upper floor.

The interior is notable for the Art Deco murals. Six murals on the auditorium walls, painted by Paul Honoré, depict a traveling troupe of troubadours. Eight smaller banners represent skills and trades needed to stage a theatrical production.

== Plays ==
Members of the Players put on three one-act plays each "Frolic." Frolics take place on the first Saturday evening of the month, October through April, with the following exceptions: November, where a full three-act play is presented, and January, where the frolic is replaced with an annual fund raising event such as a "Millionaire's Party." All roles, as well as direction, costuming, set construction, and the like, are taken by members. In the Shakespearean tradition, all roles on stage are played by men.

== Site ==
The bed of Parents Creek lies underneath one corner of the building. Near this site on July 31, 1763, the Battle of Bloody Run (so called because the creek ran red with blood) took place between Chief Pontiac and British forces. A state of Michigan historical marker commemorating this battle sits in front of this building.

== See also ==
- Players (disambiguation)
