= Epcot International Food & Wine Festival =

Food festival at Walt Disney World

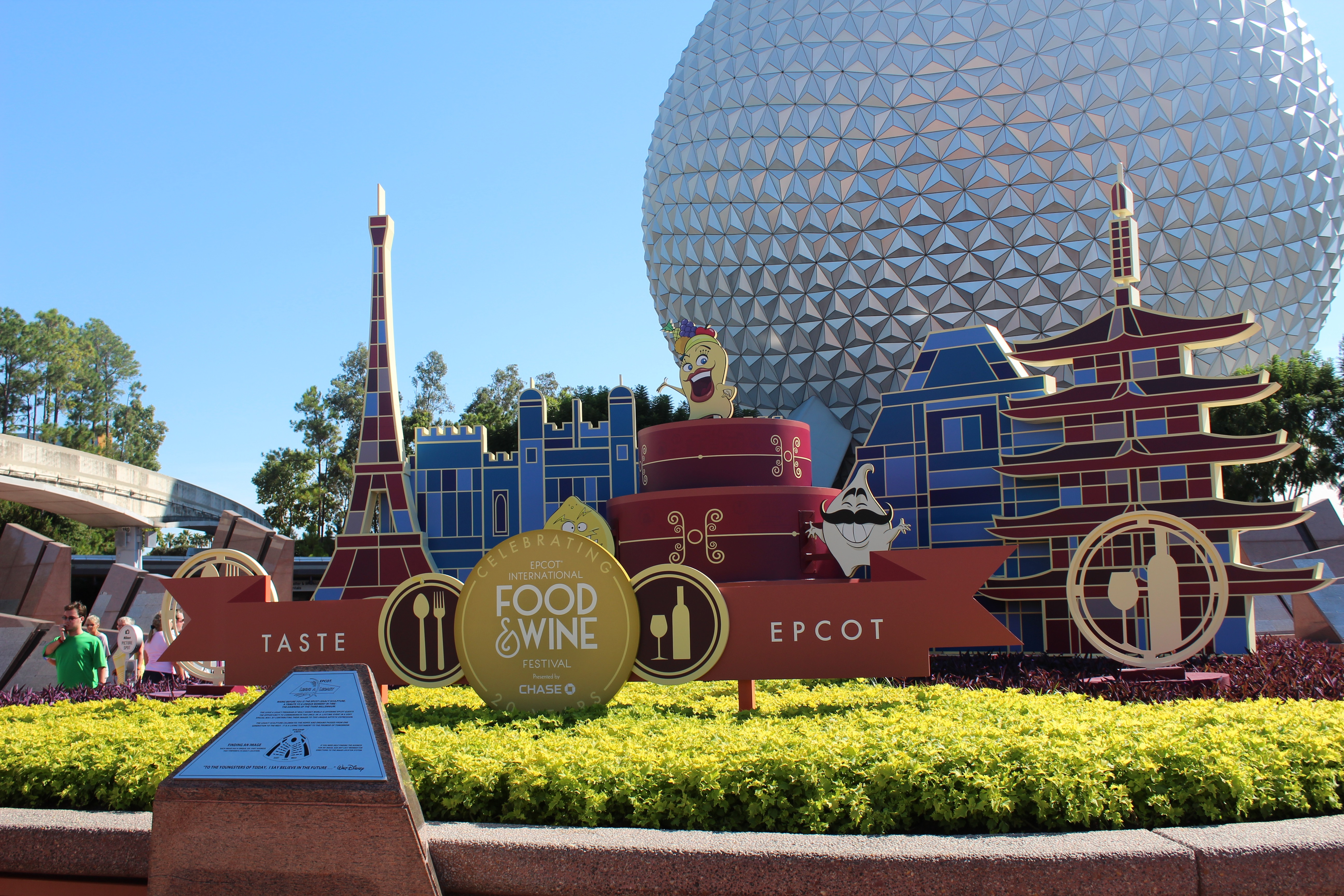
- Frequency: Yearly
- Venue: Epcot
- Location: Walt Disney World in Bay Lake, Florida
- Country: United States
- Inaugurated: September 28, 1996; 30 years ago
- Most recent: August 28, 2025; 14 months ago
- Next event: August 27, 2026; 2 months ago
- Major events: Alcoholic drinks, food tasting, musical concerts, cooking demonstrations
- Website: Official website

The Epcot International Food & Wine Festival is an annual food festival at Epcot, in the Walt Disney World Resort in Bay Lake, Florida. It would typically run from late September to mid-November, though in recent years the start date has moved earlier to mid-July. Special kiosks are set up around the World Showcase with food and drinks that reflect various countries. The activities, themes and corporate sponsors have changed over the years since the festival began in 1995.

Admission to the basic festival is included with park admission, but guests must purchase the food and drink separately. Activities have included concerts, book signings and demonstrations. Certain special events require a separate admission pass.

== History ==
George Kalogridis initially conceived the idea for the festival in the mid-1990s during his tenure as the Disney vice president in charge of EPCOT. The first Epcot International Food and Wine Festival was held in 1996. The thirty-day event ran from September 28 through October 27 and replaced a one weekend wine festival that was once held in previous years. The event featured food booths and stands, a gourmet food market, cooking demonstrations, seminars, wine sampling, and appearances by celebrity chefs.

=== 1996 ===
The first festival was held from September 28, 1996 until October 27, 1996 and included live entertainment as well as an international menu that included more than 200 wines. Programming included appearances by Norman Van Aken, Jean-Louis Palladin, Larry Forgione, and Patrick Clark, as well as daily wine seminars in the America Garden Theater and a series priced at $75 per person in the Norway Lounge for a five-course food and wine pairing planned by a guest chef. Around the festival at large, many food, wine, and beer items were priced at $1 or $2.

=== 1997 ===
This festival expanded its beer offerings, including a Budweiser beer school and two beer gardens. It also expanded offerings for children, including a scavenger hunt related to food. More than twice as many chefs participated in the 1997 festival as in 1996.

=== 1998 ===
The 1998 festival was held from October 24, 1998 until November 27, 1998.

=== 1999 ===
The 1999 festival started on October 23, 1999. The festival showcased food and drink from more than 30 countries, included wine seminars, beverage tastings, and the Winemaker Dinners curated by chefs, and it ended on November 20, 1999.

=== 2000 ===
The 2000 festival was held from October 21, 2000 to November 19, 2000. Celebrity appearances included Rick Bayless, Bobby Flay, Hugh Johnson, Andrea Robinson, and Oliver Saucy.

=== 2014 ===
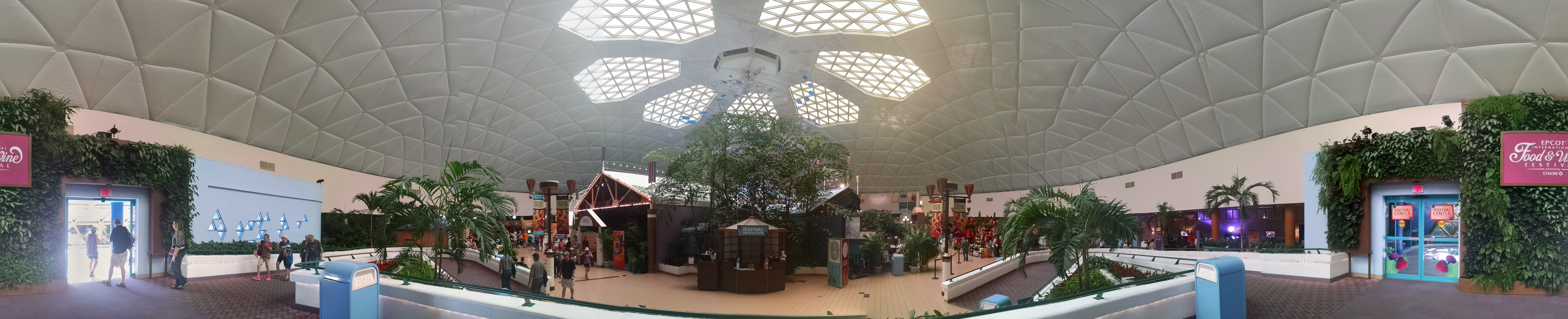
The Wonders of Life Pavilion being used as the Festival Center during the 2014 Epcot International Food & Wine Festival

The Orlando Sentinel reported that the 2014 Epcot International Food & Wine Festival was to include 100,000 dessert portions, 360,000 beer servings, 300,000 wine pours, 1.5 million tapas-size food samplings and visitors from over 25 nations.

The event ran from September 19 to November 10, a total of 53 days, which was the longest in the festival's 19-year history.

==== 2014 Food Booths ====
- Africa
- Australia
- Belgium
- Block & Hans
- Brazil
- Brewer's Collection
- Canada
- China
- Craft Beers
- Desserts & Champagne
- Farm Fresh
- Fife & Drum
- France, Germany
- Greece
- Hawai'i
- Hops & Barley
- Ireland
- Italy
- Japan
- Mexico
- Morocco
- New Zealand
- Patagonia
- Poland
- Puerto Rico
- Refreshment Port
- Scotland
- Singapore
- South Korea
- Terra
- The Refreshment Cool Post

==== 2014 Eat to the Beat Concert Series ====
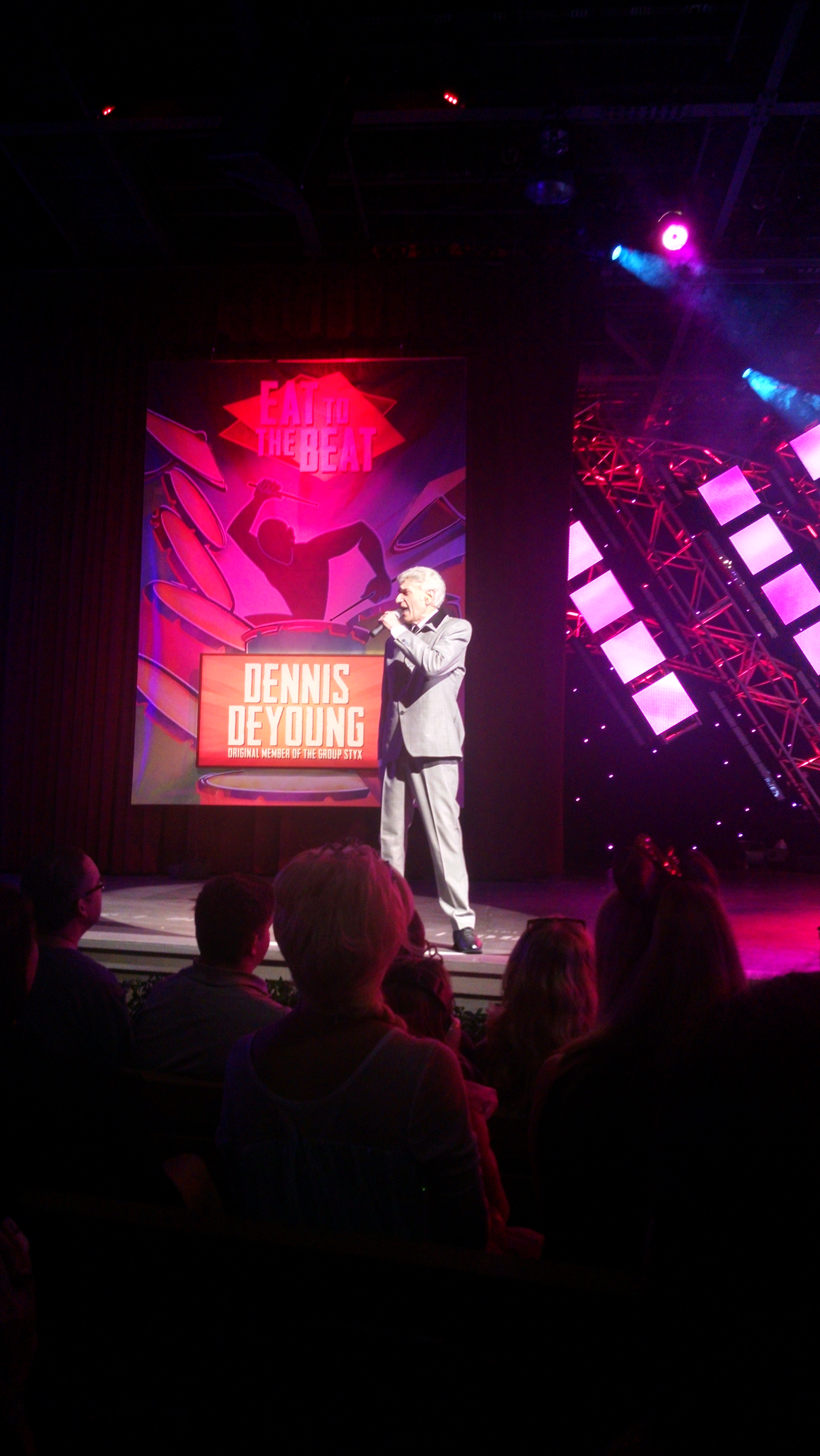
Dennis DeYoung performing during the 2014 Eat to the Beat Concert Series

- Jo Dee Messina
- The Pointer Sisters
- The Commodores
- Christopher Cross
- Hanson
- Air Supply
- Starship featuring Mickey Thomas
- Sugar Ray
- Fuel
- Sister Hazel
- Richard Marx
- Billy Ocean
- Night Ranger
- Smash Mouth
- Jim Brickman
- Los Lonely Boys
- Wilson Phillips
- Dennis DeYoung (original member of STYX)
- 38 Special
- Boyz II Men
- David Cook
- Big Bad Voodoo Daddy.

These performers rotated through America Gardens Theater three times during the day during the festival, at 5:30 pm, 6:45 pm, and 8:00 pm.

=== 2015 ===
The 2015 Epcot International Food & Wine Festival ran from September 25 through November 16. The 2015 festival saw the additions of new booths including the Cheese Studio, the Wine Studio, Intermissions Café, The Outpost, Chew Lab, and Sustainable Chew, the latter two being inspired by the ABC show The Chew, as well a Dominican Republic booth. Also, the Ocean Spray Cranberry Bog returned for its fourth year after a one-year absence. Two countries did not return from the 2014 lineup, Puerto Rico and Singapore.

==== 2015 Eat to the Beat Concert Series ====
The lineup included the return of Dennis DeYoung, Starship with Mickey Thomas, Christopher Cross, The Pointer Sisters, 38 Special, and Air Supply, alongside newcomers Tiffany, Maxi Priest, Everclear, and Chaka Khan.

=== 2016 ===
The 2016 Epcot International Food & Wine Festival ran from September 14 through November 14. The 2016 festival saw the additions of new booths including the Brewer's Collection, the Chocolate Studio and the Islands of the Caribbean. Not returning from the 2015 lineup included the booths of Fife & Drum, The Outpost, and Terra. The Wine Studio was combined with the Cheese Studio to become the Wine & Dine Studio, while The Chew Lab and Sustainable Chew combined to become The Chew Collective. The festival also included new premium events at some of the Disney resorts for the first time, including events at Disney's Contemporary Resort, Disney's Grand Floridian Resort & Spa, Disney's Polynesian Village Resort & Disney's Yacht Club Resort.

==== 2016 Eat to the Beat Concert Series ====
The lineup includes the return of Dennis DeYoung, Starship with Mickey Thomas, Fuel, Sugar Ray, Los Lobos, Wilson Phillips, Blues Traveler, Christopher Cross, 38 Special, Chaka Khan, Billy Ocean, Hanson, Boyz II Men, Sister Hazel, Big Bad Voodoo Daddy, and Air Supply, alongside newcomers Wang Chung, BoDeans, Plain White T’s, Jeffrey Osborne, Toad The Wet Sprocket, Living Colour, Soul Asylum, & Delta Rae.

=== 2017 ===
The 2017 Epcot International Food & Wine Festival ran from August 31 through November 13.

=== 2018 ===
The 23rd Epcot International Food & Wine Festival was held from August 30 to November 12, 2018. There were numerous new additions to the festival in 2018 including a Character Dance Party, Sunday Brunch with the Chef, Junior Chef Kitchen and Food & Beverage Pairings. Returning special events such as celebrity chef demonstrations (From names such as Robert Irvine, Art Smith, Alex Guarnaschelli), Seminars for Cheese, Beverages, and Baking, Party for the Senses and 36 Food & Beverage Booths in the Marketplace throughout Epcot.

Festival Booth Listing: Active Eats, Africa, Almond Orchard (Hosted by Blue Diamond Almond Breeze), Australia, Belgium, Brazil, Brewer's Collection, Canada, The Cheese Studio (Hosted by Boursin Cheese, China, Chocolate Studio, Coastal Eats, Craft Drafts, Earth Eats, The Festival Center Wine Shop, Flavors from Fire, France, Germany, Greece, Hawai'i, Hops & Barley, India, Ireland, Islands of the Caribbean, Italy, Japan, Light Lab, Mexico, Morocco, New Zealand, Refreshment Outpost, Refreshment Port, Shimmering Sips Mimosa Bar, Spain, Thailand, Wine and Dine Studio.

==== 2018 Eat to the Beat Concert Series ====
During the Festival, you can catch some of the most popular bands from the 80s to the 2000s performing nightly at the America Gardens Theater. Shows are at 5:30p, 6:45p and 8:00p nightly. These concerts are free with Epcot admission.

Featured bands include: Blue October, Tiffany, Mercy Me, Glass Tiger, Tauren Wells, Postmodern Jukebox, Vertical Horizon, Baha Men, Plain White T's, Living Color, Sheila E., Sugar Ray, David Cook, Jeffrey Osbourne, Jim Belushi with Sacred Hearts, Everclear, Mark Wills, Air Supply, Anderson East, Sister Hazel, 98 Degrees, .38 Special, Devon Allman Project, Kenny G, Billy Ocean, Starship with Mickey Thomas, Hanson, High Valley, Taylor Dayne, Boyz II Men, The Hooters, Big Bad Voodoo Daddy.

=== 2019 ===
The 24th Annual Epcot International Food & Wine Festival ran from August 29 to November 23 for a record 87 days. It featured "Party for the Senses", Eat to the Beat Concerts, Demonstrations from Celebrity Chefs, a record number of food booths in the Global Marketplace, and all new seminars.

==== 2019 Eat to the Beat Concert Series ====
During the Festival, you can catch some of the most popular bands from the 80s to the 2000s performing nightly at the America Gardens Theater. Shows are at 5:30p, 6:45p and 8:00p nightly. These concerts are free with Epcot admission.

Featured Bands: Everclear, 38 Special, Sheena Easton.

=== 2020 ===
The 25th Annual Epcot International Food & Wine Festival ran from July 15 to November 22, 2020 under the name Taste of EPCOT International Food & Wine. As part of Walt Disney World's modified operations due to the COVID-19 pandemic, the 2020 festival did not feature the Eat to the Beat concert series.

=== 2021 ===
The 26th Annual Epcot International Food & Wine Festival ran from July 15 to November 20, 2021, as part of Walt Disney World Resort's 50th Anniversary celebration, which is under the name Walt Disney World's The World's Most Magical Celebration, since the beginning October 1, 2021.

==== 2021 Eat to the Beat Concert Series ====
During the Festival, you can catch some of the most popular bands from the 80s to the 2000s performing nightly at the America Gardens Theater. Shows are at 5:30p, 6:45p and 8:00p nightly. These concerts are free with Epcot admission.

=== 2022 ===
The 27th Annual Epcot International Food & Wine Festival ran from July 14 to November 19, 2022, as part of Walt Disney World Resort's 50th Anniversary celebration.

==== 2022 Eat to the Beat Concert Series ====
During the Festival, you can catch some of the most popular bands from the 80s to the 2000s performing nightly at the America Gardens Theater. Shows are at 5:30p, 6:45p and 8:00p nightly. These concerts are free with Epcot admission.

=== 2023 ===
The 28th Annual Epcot International Food & Wine Festival ran from July 27 to November 18, 2023, as part of The Walt Disney Company's 100th Anniversary celebration, which is under the name Disney 100 Years of Wonder celebration, since the beginning October 16, 2023.

==== 2023 Eat to the Beat Concert Series ====
During the Festival, you can catch some of the most popular bands from the 80s to the 2000s performing nightly at the America Gardens Theater. Shows are at 5:30p, 6:45p and 8:00p nightly. These concerts are free with Epcot admission.

=== 2024 ===
The 29th Annual Epcot International Food & Wine Festival ran from August 29 to November 23, 2024.

==== 2024 Eat to the Beat Concert Series ====
During the Festival, you can catch some of the most popular bands from the 80s to the 2000s performing nightly at the America Gardens Theater. Shows are at 5:30p, 6:45p and 8:00p nightly. These concerts are free with Epcot admission.

The line up includes the return of The Fray, Sugar Ray, Hoobastank, Tiffany, MercyMe, Sheila E., Luis Figueroa, Joey Fatone & Friends, We The Kings, Switchfoot, Billy Ocean, Hanson, Boyz II Men, Smash Mouth, 98 Degrees, alongside newcomers Yellowcard, The Wanted, Mau Y Ricky, Jesse & Joy, Aloe Blacc, David Archuleta, Haley Reinhart (featuring Emily Estefan, Casey Abrams and Janel Parrish), Magic!, and Parmalee.

=== 2025 ===
The 30th Annual Epcot International Food & Wine Festival ran from August 28 to November 22, 2025.

==== 2025 Eat to the Beat Concert Series ====
During the Festival, you can catch some of the most popular bands from the 80s to the 2000s performing nightly at the America Gardens Theater. Shows are at 5:30p, 6:45p and 8:00p nightly. These concerts are free with Epcot admission.

=== 2026 ===
The 31st Annual Epcot International Food & Wine Festival ran from August 27 to November 21, 2026, celebrating the festival's 30th anniversary.

==== 2026 Eat to the Beat Concert Series ====
During the Festival, you can catch some of the most popular bands from the 80s to the 2000s performing nightly at the America Gardens Theater. Shows are at 5:30p, 6:45p and 8:00p nightly. These concerts are free with Epcot admission.

== Criticism ==
The festival has been criticized for bringing high crowd levels to Epcot, particularly weekends; lack of entertainment; and displays of public drunkenness.

== See also ==
- Epcot International Festival of the Arts
- Epcot International Flower & Garden Festival
- Epcot International Festival of the Holidays
