= Player =

Player may refer to:

== Role or adjective ==
- Player (game), a participant in a game or sport
  - Gamer, a player in video and tabletop games
  - Athlete, a player in sports
  - Player character, a character in a video game or role playing game who is controlled or controllable by a player
- Player (political), a participant in politics who has or is perceived to have influence or power
- Global player, a corporate organization that owns production of some good or service in at least one country other than its home country
- Player, Shakespearan term for a stage actor
- Player (slang), a philanderer, often male

== People ==
- Player (surname)

== Art, entertainment, and media ==
- The Player, 1988 novel by Michael Tolkin, the basis for the 1992 film
- The Player (1953 film)
- The Player (1992 film), an American film

=== Music ===
- Player (band), a 1970s rock band from Los Angeles, California
- Player (Player album), 1977
- Player (M. Pokora album), 2006
- Player (Capsule album), 2010
- The Player (First Choice album), 1974
- The Player (The Supermen Lovers album), 2001
- "Player" (song), a 2015 song by Tinashe
- "The Player" (Jolin Tsai song), 2018

=== Television ===
- Player (TV channel), former name of Bravo 2, television channel in the United Kingdom
- The Player Channel, television channel in the United Kingdom
- Player.pl, a Polish VOD service
- The Player (Algerian TV series), a 2004 Algerian drama series
- The Player (2004 TV series), a 2004 American reality series
- The Player (2015 TV series), a 2015 American drama series
- Player (TV series), a 2018 South Korean TV series
- The Player (Thai TV series), a 2020 Thai drama series

== Computing ==
- Media player (software), a piece of software tailored for playing back different forms of multimedia file formats
- Player Project, a robot interface specification and software system
- VMware Player

== Technology ==
- Blu-ray Disc player, a device that plays discs with high definition video
- CD player, a device that plays audio discs
- DVD player, a device that plays discs produced under both the DVD-Video and DVD-Audio technical standards
- Portable media player (PMP) or digital audio player (DAP) (was often marketed as MP3 player), a device capable of storing and playing digital media such as audio, images, and video files
- Player piano, a self-playing piano, containing a pneumatic or electro-mechanical mechanism that operates the piano action via pre-programmed music
- Record player, a device that plays vinyl records
- Tape player, a device that plays magnetic tapes

== See also ==
- Play (disambiguation)
- Players (disambiguation)
- Ployer (disambiguation)
