= Epcot International Flower & Garden Festival =

Flower festival at Walt Disney World

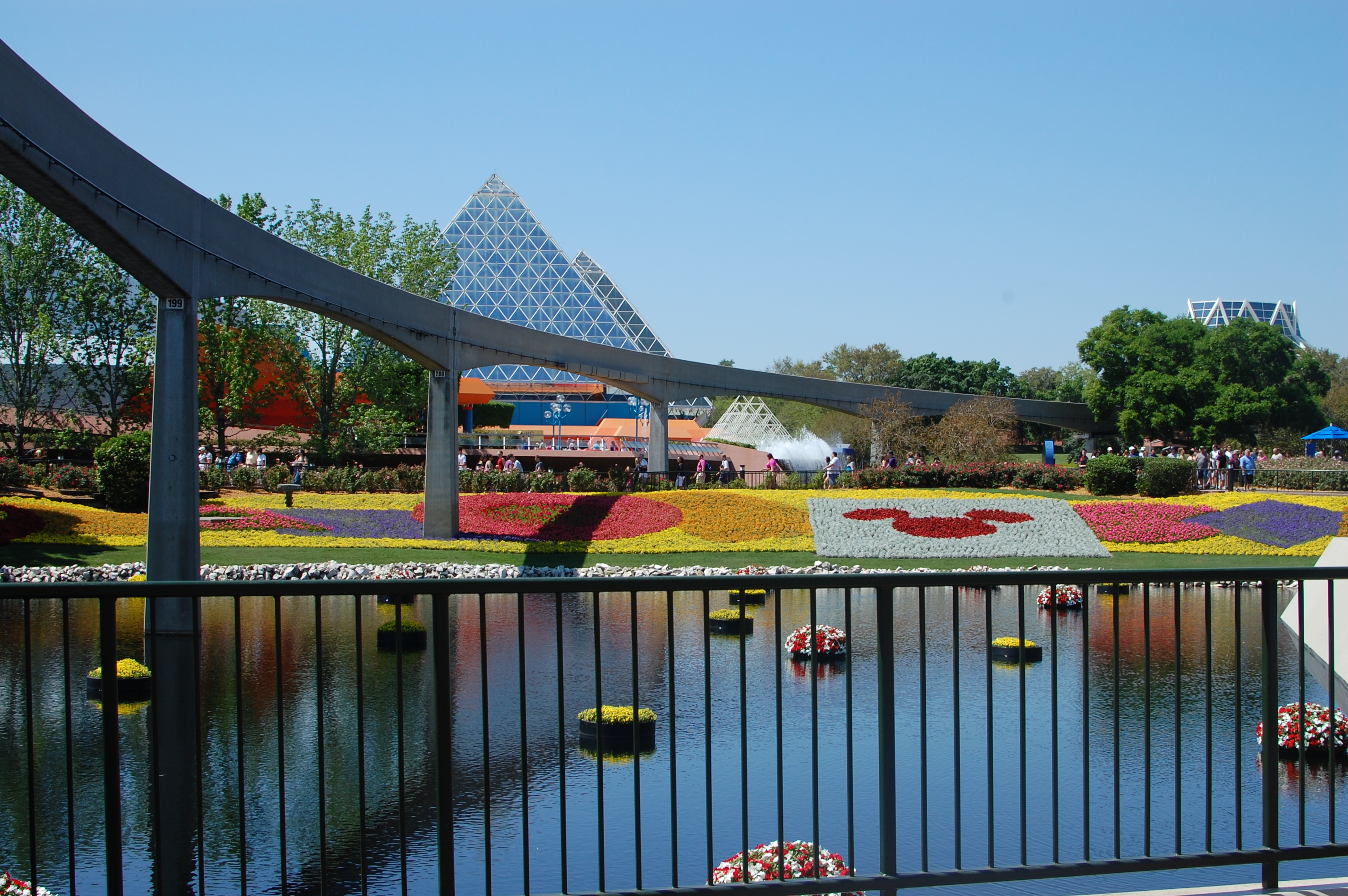
- Genre: Garden festival
- Begins: March 5
- Ends: June 2
- Frequency: Annually
- Venue: Epcot
- Location: Bay Lake, Florida
- Country: United States
- Inaugurated: 1994
- Website: Official website

The Epcot International Flower & Garden Festival is an annual garden festival at Epcot in Walt Disney World Resort in Bay Lake, Florida near Orlando in the spring, typically from early February through late May. The festival is included with regular admission, however, there are a couple events during the festival that do cost extra if guests choose to attend.

== History ==
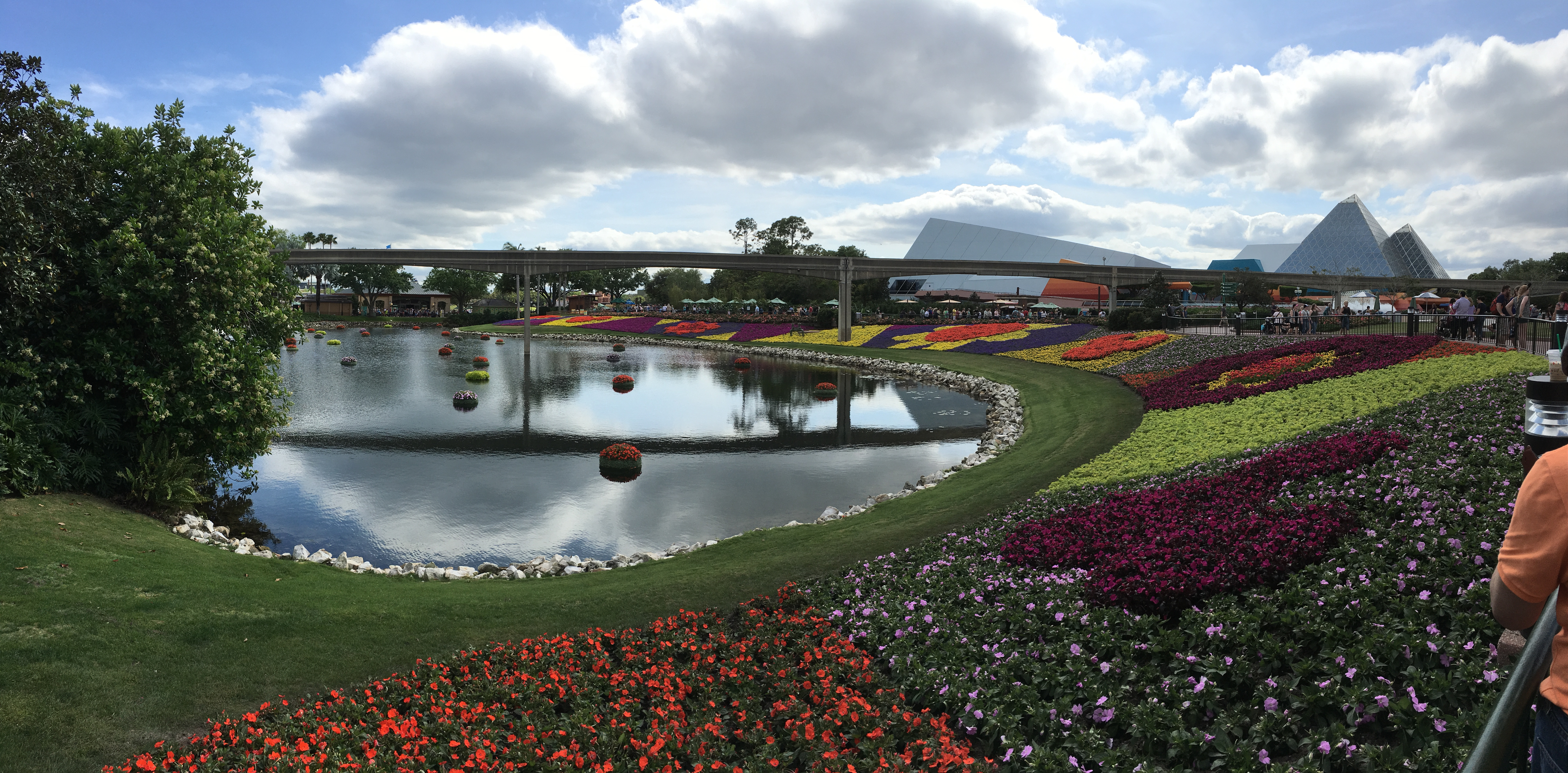
The Flower & Garden Festival in 2019

=== 1995 ===
In 1995 the Festival debuted a new miniature train and town display next to the Germany pavilion. Officially named the Epcot Garden Railway, the display showcased flowers amid the train tracks and buildings, and was so popular, it has been in its same location ever since. Props are added during some festivals to correspond with the official festival signage around the World Showcase lagoon.

=== 2015 ===
The 2015 Festival included the new additions of Anna and Elsa, Goofy About Spring (featuring Goofy, Chip 'n' Dale and friends), Kermit the Frog and Miss Piggy topiaries, as well as the return of Spring Is in the Air!, Buzz Lightyear, Cactus Road Rally (featuring Mater and Lightning McQueen), Fantasia, Phineas and Ferb, Farmer Mickey and Minnie (based on American Gothic), Bambi with Thumper and Flower, Peter Pan, Aurora and Prince Phillip, Beauty and the Beast, Woody, Snow White and the Seven Dwarfs, Lady and the Tramp, The Lion King, Cinderella and Prince Charming, Year of the Ram, and Troll topiaries, as well as the Butterfly Garden. It was also the debut of the Garden Rocks Concert Series, which replaced the Flower Power Concert Series.

=== 2016 ===
The 2016 festival introduced a Huey, Dewey, and Louie topiary, a Ranger Mickey Mouse topiary to celebrate the National Park Service centennial, Floral Sun garden, and the “Fab Five” play garden.

=== 2017 ===
The 2017 festival introduced a Figment topiary, re-imagined princess topiaries and a re-imagined Cars garden, as well as a new front entrance topiary.

=== 2019 ===
2019 brought the expansion of the popular Garden Rocks concerts to nightly as well as a brand new set of topiaries (Bo Peep and her Sheep) celebrating Toy Story 4.

=== 2020 ===
The COVID-19 pandemic caused the festival to go on hiatus until 2022.

=== 2022 ===
It featured Snow White and the re-imagined Seven Dwarfs from Walt Disney Animation Studios' Snow White and the Seven Dwarfs and Lumiere and Cogsworth from Walt Disney Animation Studios' Beauty and the Beast, as well as Walt Disney World Resort's 50th anniversary celebration cake.

=== 2023 ===
It featured Mirabel Madrigal, Antonio Madrigal, Isabella Madrigal and Luisa Madrigal from Walt Disney Animation Studios' Encanto and Tiana from Walt Disney Animation Studios' The Princess and the Frog.

=== 2024 ===
It featured Asha, Valentino and Star from Walt Disney Animation Studios' Wish, Groot from Marvel Studios' Guardians of the Galaxy films and Disney+ I am Groot shorts, and Miguel Rivera and Dante from Pixar's Coco.

=== 2025 ===
It featured Moana, Maui, Hei-Hei and Pua from Walt Disney Animation Studios' Moana, and Winnie the Pooh, Tigger, Eeyore, Tigger and Rabbit from Walt Disney Animation Studios' Winnie the Pooh franchise.

=== 2026 ===
It featured the returning of old and new characters' gardens and topiaries in World Celebration, World Nature, World Discovery and World Showcase, as well as Mabel (and her animal form), Ellen the bear, a grumpy rabbit, the Amphibian King, a deer, and a crane from Pixar's Hoppers, and Pixar's 40th Anniversary celebration entrance.

=== 2027 ===
- TBA

== See also ==
- Epcot International Food & Wine Festival
