= Ployer =

Ployer may refer to:

- Barbara Ployer (1765–1811), an Austrian piano and composition pupil of Mozart for whom he composed two piano concertos
- Ployer Peter Hill (1894-1935), US Army Air Corps test pilot
