= FIFA Fair Play Trophy =

FIFA Fair Play Trophy may refer to:

- FIFA Fair Play Trophy, FIFA competition award for the team with the best record of fair play
  - FIFA World Cup - FIFA Fair Play Trophy, FIFA World Cup award for the team with the best record of fair play
  - FIFA U-20 World Cup - FIFA Fair Play Trophy, FIFA U-20 World Cup award for the team with the best record of fair play
  - FIFA U-17 World Cup - FIFA Fair Play Trophy, FIFA U-17 World Cup award for the team with the best record of fair play
  - FIFA Women's World Cup - FIFA Fair Play Trophy, FIFA Women's World Cup award for the team with the best record of fair play
  - FIFA U-20 Women's World Cup - FIFA Fair Play Trophy, FIFA U-20 Women's World Cup award for the team with the best record of fair play
  - FIFA U-17 Women's World Cup - FIFA Fair Play Trophy, FIFA U-17 Women's World Cup award for the team with the best record of fair play
  - FIFA Club World Cup - FIFA Fair Play Trophy, FIFA Club World Cup award for the team with the best record of fair play
  - FIFA Confederations Cup - FIFA Fair Play Trophy, FIFA Confederations Cup award for the team with the best record of fair play

== See also ==
- FIFA Fair Play Award
