= Players Championship =

Players Championship may refer to:

- The Players Championship, a PGA Tour golf event since 1974
- A former name for the Scottish Open (snooker)
- Players Championship Finals, a PDC darts tournament since 2009
- Players' Championship, a Grand Slam curling event since 1993
- PBA Players Championship, a PBA Tour bowling tournament held from 1983-2000, 2011, 2013, and since 2015
- Players Championship (snooker), a professional snooker tournament since 2017
- 2004 Players Championship (snooker), a professional snooker tournament held in 2004.
- Players Tour Championship, a series of snooker tournaments held 2010–2016, and sometimes referred to as the Player's Championship in its first year
