= Fair Play, Texas =

Unincorporated community in Texas, US

Coordinates: 32°08′50″N 94°31′53″W

Fair Play (sometimes written as "Fairplay") is an unincorporated community in Panola County, in the U.S. state of Texas.

== History ==
The first settlement at Fair Play was made in the 1840s. According to tradition, the community was so named on account of the fairness characterized by first settlers.
