= The Players (Malagasy band) =

Madagascar musical band

The Players was a Madagascar musical band in the 1970s. They gained more fame when Eusèbe Jaojoby commonly known by his surname Jaojoby joined the band for experimental blending of Western and Malagasy musical elements becoming a definitive period for Jaojoby and the band and the advancement of the modern salegy genre. Earlier Jaojoby had been in Los Matadores, but left them in 1975 for a desire for greater freedom to write songs and further develop the syncretic modern salegy style with The Players, who were willing to take more risks with music. The band was managed by a Chinese shopkeeper who provided them with a sound system and generator. The band toured northwestern Madagascar for the next four years with increasing success, recording two 45rpm singles and performing in Mahajanga, Diego-Suarez and other towns and villages throughout the region before disbanding in 1979.
