= Playfair (surname) =

Playfair is a Scottish surname. The family is mentioned in Charles Rogers' 1887 book Four Perthshire families: Roger, Playfair, Constable and Haldane of Barmony.

One of the earliest records of the name is in the Calendar of Documents Relating to Scotland, which contains an entry from 19th August 1290 referencing William Playfayre, the Earl of Orkney's messenger, who was delivering letters from John Comyn to Edward I, concerning the arrival of Margaret, Maid of Norway in Orkney.

Notable people with the surname include:

- Andrew W. Playfair (1790–1868), Canadian politician, son of William
- Dylan Playfair (born 1992), Canadian actor
- Sir Edward Playfair (1909–1999), British civil servant and businessman
- Guy Lyon Playfair (1935 – 2018) British writer, son of I.S.O. Playfair
- Henry Playfair (born 1983), Australian rules footballer
- Hugh Lyon Playfair (1787–1861), Provost of St Andrews
- Ian Stanley Ord Playfair (1894–1972), a general in the British Army and contributing author to British official history of the Second World War
- James Playfair (architect) (1755–1794), Scottish architect, brother of John, Robert and William, father of William Henry
- Jim Playfair (born 1964), Canadian ice hockey player and coach, brother of Larry
- John Playfair (1748–1819), Scottish scientist, mathematician, and professor of natural philosophy; brother of James, Robert and William
- Judy Playfair (born 1953), Australian swimmer
- Sir Lambert Playfair (1828–1899), British soldier and author
- Larry Playfair (born 1958), Canadian ice hockey player and announcer, brother of Jim
- Lyon Playfair, 1st Baron Playfair (1818–1898), British promoter of the Playfair cipher, manual symmetric encryption technique
- Sir Nigel Playfair (1874–1934), British actor and theater manager
- Patrick Playfair (1889–1974), British senior officer in Flying Corps and later RAF
- Wendy Playfair (1926–2026), Australian actress
- William Playfair (1759–1823), Scottish engineer and political economist, inventor of statistical graphics, brother of James, Robert and John
- William Henry Playfair (1790–1857), Scottish architect (National Gallery of Scotland, Royal Scottish Academy), son of James
- John Playfair Price (1905–1988), British diplomat
