= Play =

Play most commonly refers to:

- Play (activity), an activity done for enjoyment
- Play (theatre), a work of drama

Play may refer also to:

== Computers and technology ==
- Google Play, a digital content service
- Play Framework, a Java framework
- Play Mobile, a Polish internet provider
- Xperia Play, an Android phone
- Rakuten.co.uk (formerly Play.com), an online retailer
- Backlash (engineering), or play, non-reversible part of movement
- Petroleum play, oil fields with same geological circumstances
- Play symbol, in media control devices
- Play (hacker group), a ransomware extortion group

== Film ==
- Play (2005 film), Chilean film directed by Alicia Scherson
- Play, a 2009 short film directed by David Kaplan
- Play (2011 film), a Swedish film directed by Ruben Östlund
- Play!, a Japanese film directed by Tomoyuki Furumaya
- Rush (2012 film), an Indian film earlier titled Play and also known as Raftaar 24 x 7
- The Play (film), a 2013 Indian Bengali-language film
- Aattam or The Play, a 2024 Indian Malayalam-language film

== Games and sports ==
- Gameplay
- Play from scrimmage in American and Canadian football
- The Play (American football), a famous last-second kickoff return by the California Golden Bears to beat the Stanford Cardinal in 1982

== Literature and publications ==
- Play (play), written by Samuel Beckett
- Play (The New York Times), a sports magazine
- Play (UK magazine), a UK PlayStation magazine
- Play (US magazine), a US video game, manga and anime magazine
- Play (PRC magazine), a Chinese PC gaming magazine

== Music ==
=== Classical music ===
- Play (composition), a 2013 symphony by Andrew Norman
- Play! A Video Game Symphony

=== Artists and bands ===
- Play (rapper) (Christopher Martin, born 1962), one half of Kid 'n Play
- Play (Swedish group)
- Play (Mexican band)

=== Albums ===
- Play (Akdong Musician album), 2014
- Play (Bond album)
- Play (Brad Paisley album)
- Play (Chick Corea and Bobby McFerrin album), 1992
- Play (David Ball album)
- Play (Doug E. Fresh album)
- Play (Ed Sheeran album), 2025
- Play (Great Big Sea album), 1997
- Play (Joanna MacGregor album), 2002
- Play (Jolin Tsai album), 2014
- Play (Magazine album), 1980
- Play (Masaki Suda album), 2018
- Play (Mike Stern album), 1999
- Play (MiSaMo album), 2026
- Play (Moby album), 1999
- Play (Namie Amuro album), 2007
- Play (Peter Gabriel video)
- Play (Play album), by the Swedish group
- Play (S.H.E album)
- Play (Sid album), 2006
- Play (Squeeze album), 1991
- Play (Super Junior album), 2017
- Play (Ride EP), 1990
- Play (Ricky Martin EP), 2022
- Play (Dave Grohl EP), 2018
- Play! (EP), by South Arcade, 2025
- Play, by The Surfaris, 1963
- Play, by Pedro Suárez-Vértiz, 2004
- Play, by RL Grime, 2023
- Plays, by Andy Dixon
- Plays, by Ekkehard Ehlers, 2002

=== Songs ===
- "Play" (Chungha song), 2020
- "Play" (David Banner song), 2005
- "Play" (Jax Jones and Years & Years song), 2018
- "Play" (Jennifer Lopez song), 2001
- "Play" (Jessie J song), 2018
- "Play" (Jolin Tsai song), 2014
- "Play" (Jüri Pootsmann song), 2016
- "Play" (K-391, Alan Walker and Martin Tungevaag song), 2019
- "Play" (Robyn song), 1999
- "Play" (Yuju song), 2022
- "(Play)", by the Lottery Winners from Anxiety Replacement Therapy
- "Play", by Band-Maid from World Domination
- "Play", by Kilo Kish from American Gurl, 2022
- "Play", by Sekai No Owari from Tree
- "Play", by SS501
- "Play", by Taio Cruz from TY.O
- "Play", by Todrick Hall featuring Jade Novah from Forbidden
- "The Play", from the Be More Chill soundtrack
- The Play, suite from Elvis Costello composition Il Sogno

=== Concert residencies and tours ===
- Play Tour, concert tour headlined by Spanish singer Aitana
- Play (concert residency), 2022 Katy Perry concert residency

=== Awards ===
- PLAY - Portuguese Music Awards

== Television ==
- Play (TV series), a Canadian news magazine series
- Television play
- "Play" (Not Going Out), a 2013 episode
- "The Play", 1993 episode of Matlock
- "The Play", 2011 episode of The Middle
- "The Play", 1968 episode of Mission: Impossible
- "The Play", 1986 episode of Mr. Belvedere
- "The Play", 2005 episode of Zoey 101

== Media ==
=== Television channels ===
- ITV Play, a defunct British television channel
- Play UK, a defunct UKTV channel
- PlayTV (Brazilian TV channel), a Brazilian television channel
- Play (Belgian TV channel), a Belgian television channel
- Play Fictie, a Belgian television channel
- TV 2 Play, a Danish on-demand channel

=== Other uses in media ===
- Globoplay, a Brazilian video on-demand streaming service
- RTP Play, a Portuguese video streaming service

== Video games ==
- Play, The Videogames World, European exhibition
- Wii Play, 2006

== Other uses ==
- Play (airline), an Icelandic low-cost airline
- Play (Jonker), a 2002 sculpture
- Play (BDSM), "kinky" activities
- Play! Pavilion, a planned Epcot pavilion
- Play 99.6 (radio), Jordan
- Dave & Buster's, NYSE symbol
- Word play, a literary technique and wit in which words become the work's main subject
- 99.5 Play FM, radio station in Metro Manila, Philippines

== See also ==
- Player (disambiguation)
