= The Players (American band) =

American R&B band

- Origin: Chicago
- Genres: R&B
- Years active: 1966–1967
- Labels: Minit
- Spinoff of: The Dells
- Past members: Herbert Butler; Chuck Barksdale; Johnny Carter; Vern Allison; Mickey McGill; Otha Givens; Tony Lee Johnson

The Players are an American R&B band of the 1960s on the Minit Records label produced by Cal Carter. They had a hit with "He'll Be Back" in 1966, and issued an album of the same name in the same year.

== Discography ==
- "He'll Be Back" (C. Gordon, J. Thomas) / B: "I Wanna Be Free", 1966
- "I'm Glad I Waited" (Al Smith) / B: "Why Did I Lie", 1966
- "That's the Way" (Jimmy Georgantones) / B: "There's Got to Be a Way", 1967
- "Get Right" (Robert Dobyne, Charles Jones) / B: "I'm So Alone", 1967
