= Play! Pavilion =

Proposed pavilion at Epcot

Play!
- Pavilion icon unveiled at D23 Expo 2019

Epcot
- Area: World Discovery
- Status: Scrapped
- Cost: $123,000,000
- Replaced: Wonders of Life (Future World)

Ride statistics
- Attraction type: Pavilion
- Designer: Walt Disney Imagineering
- Theme: Digital City
- Height: 65 ft (20 m)
- Site area: 100,000 sq ft (9,300 m^{2})
- Geodesic dome size: 65 ft (20 m) high and 250 ft (76 m) in diameter

Play! was a proposed pavilion for Epcot at Walt Disney World. Located in World Discovery, it was set to open in 2021, but construction was halted in 2020 due to the COVID-19 pandemic. In January 2023, Play! was removed from EPCOT guide maps following over three years without the attraction being mentioned by Disney. Later that month, Disney officially announced that the attraction's concept was being reevaluated. As originally announced, Play was set to be constructed within the former Wonders of Life pavilion and themed as an interactive futuristic city where guests would be able to interact with a variety of Disney characters.

In June 2026, it was reported that flags bearing the Play Pavilion's icon were removed from the park's entry courtyard.

== Overview ==
According to concept artwork by Walt Disney Imagineering, the pavilion as originally announced was planned to contain:

- Animation Academy with Edna Mode-like experience where Edna Mode teaches guests to draw.
- Hotel Heist- An interactive game hosted by Judy Hopps and Nick Wilde from Zootopia.
- An Arcade
- Monorail Mark X
- A water balloon fight video game experience with various Disney characters.

Other potential attractions included meet and greets for Wreck-It-Ralph, Vanellope von Schweetz, Joy, Sadness and Baymax.
