= List of incidents at Walt Disney World =

Incidents organized by attraction

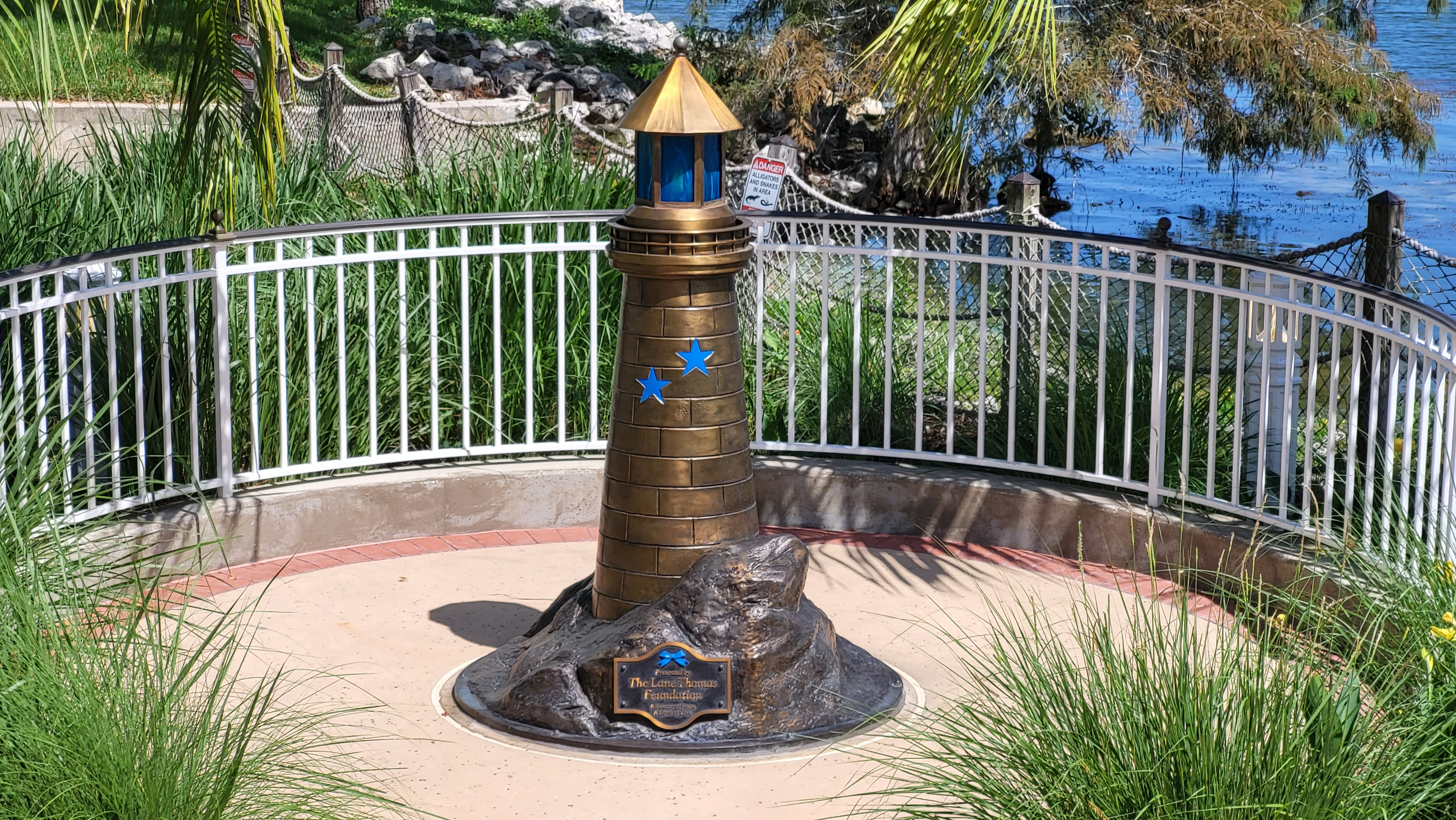
Sculpture at Disney's Grand Floridian Resort & Spa dedicated to a boy killed by a wild alligator there in 2016. Note the rope barriers and signs warning of dangerous reptiles in the background, which were erected throughout Walt Disney World due to this incident.

This is a list of notable incidents that occurred at the Walt Disney World Resort in Lake Buena Vista and Bay Lake, Florida, United States. The term "incidents" refers to major injuries, deaths, loss (or injury), or significant crimes related to the attractions themselves, or personal altercations and incidents between the theme park guests and employees. Attraction-related incidents usually fall into one of the following categories:

- Negligence on the park's part, either by ride operator or maintenance.
- Negligence on the guest's part—this includes refusal to follow specific ride safety instructions, or deliberate intent to break park rules.
- The result of a guest's known or unknown health issues.
- Acts of God, which include generic accidents (e.g. slipping and falling) that are not the direct result of an action on anyone's part.

According to a 1985 Time magazine article, nearly 100 lawsuits are annually filed against Disney for various incidents. Florida theme parks are required to notify the state of any ride-related injuries or illnesses that require a hospital stay of at least 24 hours.

== Disney Transport ==
=== Ferry Boat ===
- On December 27, 2002, eight people were injured when a ferryboat collided with the dock at the Transportation and Ticket Center after the captain put the engines into reverse too late, and was unable to stop the boat in time.
- On April 22, 2010, a 61-year-old woman from Skipton, North Yorkshire, United Kingdom suffered a collapsed lung, fractured ribs, and back pain due to a boating accident near the Magic Kingdom. The rented Sea Raycer that her husband was driving collided with a Disney ferryboat. The Orange County Sheriff's Office later stated in a report that the Sea Raycer crossed in the ferry's right-of-way.
- On December 30, 2019, a 56-year-old woman leapt from the upper deck of a ferry into the Seven Seas Lagoon. She was rescued by Disney lake patrol. The guest was uninjured and was taken to a nearby hospital for observation and mental health evaluation. The Orange County Sheriff's Office later confirmed it was a suicide attempt.
- On April 27, 2023, the Ferry Richard F. Irvine collided with the dock at the Magic Kingdom, knocking at least one person unconscious. One male guest sued Disney for $50,000, claiming that his head and neck struck a steel pillar in the collision, causing him to fall into a garbage can.

=== Bus ===
- On February 22, 1993, a 45-year-old cast member from Port Orange was killed when his red 1989 Honda Accord lost control and crashed head-on into a Disney transportation bus on the west side of Buena Vista Drive, forcing a short closure to ramps leading to Epcot. None of the 29 passengers in the bus were injured.
- On March 23, 2010, a Disney transportation bus rear-ended a private charter bus near the entrance to the Epcot parking lot. Seven guests aboard the Disney bus received minor injuries, while the bus driver was reported to have received critical injuries.
- On April 1, 2010, a 9-year-old boy from Redington Beach, Florida, was crushed to death by a Disney transportation bus at Disney's Fort Wilderness Resort & Campground while riding his bicycle. A report from the Florida Highway Patrol says that the victim appeared to turn his bike into the road and ran into the side of the bus, subsequently being dragged under the bus's right rear tire. The victim was pronounced dead at the scene. A preliminary report stated that the bus driver, who had 30 years' experience with Disney, was not impaired or driving recklessly and that charges probably would not be filed, pending a full investigation of the incident. In October 2010, the boy's mother sued Disney World. Disney settled out of court in 2012.
- On December 26, 2010, a 69-year-old Yarmouth Port, Massachusetts, man died after stepping in front of a moving Disney transportation bus in the parking lot of Disney's Port Orleans Resort.
- On December 15, 2014, a 29-year-old woman from Windermere, Florida, was killed near Disney's Coronado Springs Resort when her Honda CR-V crashed into a moving Disney transportation bus.
- On December 11, 2018, two Disney transportation buses carrying 51 people in total collided on Epcot Center Drive. Fourteen guests suffered minor injuries.
- On October 7, 2026, a 25-year-old man in a Jeep aimed a handgun at a Disney transportation bus. He was arrested and faced a felony charge of aggravated assault with a firearm. Nobody was injured or killed.

=== Car ===
- On August 21, 1989, a 29-year-old Connecticut National Guard member from New Haven, Connecticut, was killed after being hit by a truck while jogging on Florida State Road 536 at Disney World property. The driver of the truck was not charged. Florida Highway Patrol confirmed that the jogger crossed in front of him, and the driver didn't see the man running.
- On July 10, 1990, four teenage boys were killed when their late-model Ford Mustang smashed into the rear of a bus during a high-speed pursuit near the Caribbean Beach Resort at Disney World property. Three of the four boys died on scene, while the fourth boy, a 17-year-old from Orlando, was later treated with critical injuries at Orlando Regional Medical Center, where he was pronounced dead a few hours later. The Florida Highway Patrol investigated that the Mustang was traveling between 85–90 mph (137–145 km/h) when it smashed into the bus with no passengers inside during the morning hours. The driver, a 19-year-old man from Windermere, had a record of seven traffic violations and his license was suspended at the time of the crash.
- On August 31, 1994, a 20-year-old man from Kissimmee, Florida, lost control of his truck and crashed into a tree near Disney's Contemporary Resort, killing his passenger, an 18-year-old electrician from Chicago, Illinois, during a high-speed pursuit with both Disney security and the Orange County Sheriff's Office. According to authorities, Disney employees chased the truck down after witnessing its passenger standing on top of the moving vehicle.
- On April 1, 1995, a 9-year-old boy from Schoolcraft, Michigan, named Tyler Edward Hrab was killed after being fatally struck by a moving car driven by a 17-year-old Disney employee from Kissimmee in the parking lot. Hrab was airlifted to Orlando Regional Medical Center where he was pronounced dead the following day. On July 7, his parents filed a lawsuit seeking $15,500 in damages.
- On December 4, 2010, the Walt Disney World Monorail System was forced to halt its operations for 40 minutes after an unidentified SUV crashed into one of the system's pillars at one of Epcot's parking lots. No injuries were reported from the crash.
- On February 2, 2023, a 53-year-old Colombian man was hit by a car and killed while riding his bicycle on Osceola Parkway.

=== Monorail ===
- On February 12, 1974, the Mark IV Monorail Blue rear-ended the Mark IV Monorail Red due to driver error. One driver and two passengers were injured.
- On June 26, 1985, a fire engulfed the rear car of the six-car Mark IV Monorail Silver in transit from the Epcot station to the Transportation and Ticket Center. This fire pre-dated onboard fire detection systems, emergency exits, and evacuation planning. Passengers in the car kicked-out side windows and climbed around the side of the train to reach the roof, where they were subsequently rescued by the Reedy Creek Fire Department. Seven passengers were hospitalized for smoke inhalation or other minor injuries. The fire department later determined that the fire started when a flat tire dragged across the concrete beam and was ignited by the frictional heat.
- On August 30, 1991, two Disney cameramen suffered minor injuries after Mark VI Monorail Red collided with a maintenance rig outside Disney's Contemporary Resort, knocking both men down. According to authorities, nobody was on the monorail at the time of the incident because the monorail itself was used to film a Walt Disney World television commercial. At the time of the incident, the crew attempted to film Monorail Red coming out of the Contemporary Hotel and heading to the Magic Kingdom by using a camera platform in the rig.
- On August 12, 1996, Monorail Red caught fire while pulling into the Magic Kingdom station. Its driver suffered smoke inhalation and the two bus drivers suffered injuries, and all three were taken to nearby hospitals. The fire was quickly put out by Reedy Creek.
- 2009 Walt Disney World monorail accident: On July 5, 2009, during a failed track switchover from the Epcot line onto the Magic Kingdom express line, Monorail Pink backed into Monorail Purple at the Transportation & Ticket Center station, killing Monorail Purple's pilot, 21-year-old Austin Wuennenberg of Kissimmee, Florida. One cast member and six guests who were also on the trains were treated at the scene and released. OSHA and park officials inspected the monorail line and the monorail reopened on July 6, 2009, after new sensors and operating procedures were put in place. On October 31, 2011, the NTSB issued its findings on this incident, citing the probable cause as the shop panel operator's failure to properly align the switch beam before the monorail train was directed to reverse through it. OSHA proposed a total of $44,000 in fines against Disney for safety violations, but that amount was later reduced to $35,200.
- On November 18, 2015, Monorail Coral was being towed by a monorail tug for an unknown reason. The monorail separated from the tug, then crashed into it, causing damage to the body of the monorail and shattering the windshield. All monorail lines were shut down after Coral's accident but resumed operations the next day.
- On November 23, 2024, the entire monorail system was briefly shut down after a fake bomb threat was made by a 31-year-old man from Deltona, Florida. Disney bomb dogs searched the monorail and a family member's car for any destructive devices, but none were found. The man was taken into custody.

=== Parking Lot Tram ===
- On June 12, 1982, a 1-year-old girl from Muscatine, Iowa, was killed after she fell out of the tram when it made a sudden turn in the parking lot leading to the Magic Kingdom.
- On October 18, 1992, an 8-year-old girl from Indian Harbour Beach, Florida, fell from the tram while it was moving. Her 38-year-old mother reached out for her but also fell from the tram. The tram at the time was going around 15 mph. The mother was airlifted to the Orlando Regional Medical Center, where she died the following morning. The girl was transported by Reedy Creek to the Arnold Palmer Hospital for Children where she was treated and released.
- On August 14, 1993, a female guest stabbed two male guests with a 6-inch paring knife at the tram stop in the Pluto parking lot leading to the Magic Kingdom. Both men, a 41-year-old from Cinnaminson, New Jersey, and a 37-year-old from Miami, were both listed in good condition at Sand Lake Hospital. The woman left the scene and drove away with a white car. Authorities later confirmed that the woman grabbed the 37-year-old man from behind while standing with his daughter waiting for an oncoming tram, and the 41-year-old made eye contact with the female suspect before she shouted to "never look at [her] like that". The knife according to investigators was pulled out from the woman's sock.
- On July 27, 1994, lightning struck one of the trams in the parking lot leading to the Magic Kingdom. Seven people were stunned by the strike, but four people were transported to the hospital and were all released that same day.

=== Other vehicles ===
- On August 16, 1979, an 18-year-old local swimming champion from Winter Park, Florida, suffered severe injuries after being struck by a motorboat's blade propeller while swimming with nine friends in a lake at Disney World property. The propeller's blade severely injured his left leg and ankle and cut his right foot. Nearly two years later on June 29, 1981, the man was awarded $170,000 in a verdict after a jury concluded that he was 15% responsible in the accident.

== Transportation and Ticket Center ==
- On September 24, 2024, an 80-year-old man from Argentina with prostate issues and severe urinary incontinence was arrested by Orange County deputies after he exposed his penis and urinated in the bushes near the security office of the Transportation & Ticket Center. He was taken into Orange County custody and was banned from entering Disney World property. According to authorities, he attempted to speak to a cast member but couldn't understand because of his non-English accent, while his attorney said that he "didn't do anything wrong".
- On May 20, 2025, a 37-year-old woman from London, Kentucky, was arrested by Orange County deputies after Disney Security caught the woman sneaking a tin can filled with methamphetamine into the Transportation and Ticket Center. When a Disney security employee asked what the items were, she allegedly told them it was "Goody's Headache Powder", but was later confirmed as meth after a substance test by Orange County Sheriff. Police didn't confirm if they purposely snuck the items into Disney World property. She was released with a $5,000 bond shortly afterward.

== Disney's Animal Kingdom ==
=== Avatar Flight of Passage ===
- Several instances of visitors losing consciousness on the ride have been reported, leading to the installation of warning cards for riders before entering the ride. The cards are similar to those on Mission: Space and warn riders about fear of heights, motion sickness, and the seating restraints.

=== Dinosaur ===
- On April 30, 2005, a 30-year-old man from Mooresville, Indiana, lost consciousness shortly after exiting the ride and died from a heart attack moments later. An investigation showed the ride was operating correctly and was not the cause of the man's death; he had an artificial pacemaker.
- On May 29, 2013, a loaded .380-caliber pistol with five hollow-point bullets was discovered by a grandmother and grandson at one of the ride carts at Dinosaur. Disney security immediately took possession of the gun, and Orange County deputies later located the owner, who was an Orlando area resident. He responded to deputies that he didn't know everything about the park's policies. He told investigators that he had a Florida concealed weapons permit and the gun likely slipped out of his back pocket while the ride was active. The weapon was immediately turned over to deputies and the man was banned from entering Disney World property.

=== Expedition Everest: Legend of the Forbidden Mountain ===
- On December 18, 2007, a 44-year-old man from Navarre, Florida, lost consciousness while riding the coaster. He was given CPR on the ride's loading platform and was later pronounced dead at Orlando Regional Medical Center. The Orange County medical examiner's office conducted an autopsy and concluded that the victim died of dilated cardiomyopathy and the death was considered natural.

=== Kali River Rapids ===
- On May 29, 2007, five guests and one cast member were injured when an emergency exit platform malfunctioned. The guests were exiting a Kali River Rapids raft during a ride stoppage triggered by a monitoring sensor. The raft was on a steep incline and the emergency exit platform was designed to allow guests to easily access the emergency stairs from the incline. After an investigation determined that the platform "disengaged and slid", it was removed and an alternative evacuation procedure was adopted. The six people were taken to local hospitals for minor injuries and were later released.

=== Primeval Whirl ===
- On November 29, 2007, a 63-year-old cast member from Carrollton, Ohio, died from a brain injury sustained four days earlier when she was hit by a ride vehicle after falling from a restricted area of the ride platform. On May 23, 2008, OSHA fined Walt Disney World $25,500 and charged the company with five safety violations. The fines were: $15,000 for three serious violations; $7,500 for still missing a handrail that had been reported; and $3,000 for not responding to OSHA requests within the requested time period.
- On March 13, 2011, a 52-year-old cast member from Webster, Florida, sustained head injuries while working on the ride and was airlifted to Orlando Regional Medical Center, where he later died. The ride was undergoing maintenance and was closed to the public at the time of the incident.

=== Other incidents ===
- On October 19, 2020, a 41-year-old security guard was tackled to the ground from behind and placed into a headlock by a 19-year-old man from Pompano Beach, Florida, at DinoLand USA. The 19-year-old was then pulled away by guests while resisting. After being secured to a stretcher and being taken to AdventHealth Celebration by Reedy Creek, he became coherent and told a nurse that he took LSD and attempted to "kill someone at the park". Doctors confirmed that he had both drugs and alcohol in his body at the time of the fight.

== Disney's Blizzard Beach ==
- On May 29, 2025, a Florida man, Eugene Strickland, sued Walt Disney World for $50,000, claiming that Disney was negligent following a July 31, 2021 incident where the man was critically injured after riding on the Downhill Double Dipper slide. According to the lawsuit, the man, who weighed 334 pounds at the time of the incident, alleges that the ride was not properly equipped or safe for guests of his size, exceeding the ride's 300-pound weight limit, leading to serious harm. He stated in court that during the ride, he was briefly lifted off the slide, which resulted in what he describes as "permanent and catastrophic" injuries. The case was scheduled for a jury trial beginning in May 2027 but Strickland voluntarily dropped the lawsuit on October 2, 2026.

== Disney's Hollywood Studios ==
=== Indiana Jones Epic Stunt Spectacular! ===
- In 1990, OSHA fined the park $1,000 after three performers were injured in three separate incidents.
  - In one incident, a performer fell 30 feet (9.14 m) when a restraining cable failed.
  - In another incident, a performer fell 25 feet (7.62 m) when a prop ladder unexpectedly collapsed.
  - A third performer was pinned by a malfunctioning trap door. OSHA cited Disney for failing to provide adequate fall protection, including padding and other equipment.
  - Later, while rehearsing a new, safer routine, another performer fell 25 feet (7.62 m) onto concrete.
- In a rehearsal on August 17, 2009, a 30-year-old performer named Anislav Varbanov died after injuring his head while performing a tumbling roll. The next day's performances were canceled out of respect for him.
- On December 30, 2025, a 400-pound prop boulder fell off its track and bounced off the stage. A longtime cast member was cut on the forehead after being struck by the boulder while stopping it from hitting the audience.

=== Rock 'n' Roller Coaster ===
- On June 29, 2006, a 12-year-old boy visiting from Fort Campbell, Kentucky, was found to be unresponsive after the ride ended. Though his father administered CPR until Reedy Creek paramedics arrived, he was declared dead on the way to Celebration Hospital. The ride was shut down for the investigation and reopened a day later after inspectors determined that the ride was operating normally. A medical examiner determined that the boy had an undiagnosed congenital heart defect.

=== Star Tours – The Adventures Continue ===
- On October 24, 2016, a 67-year-old man from Memphis, Tennessee, died after riding Star Tours. The rider had a pre-existing heart condition, along with other contributing factors. The incident was described as part of a quarterly report filed with the Florida Department of Agriculture, which oversees the safety of the state's amusement parks.

=== Toy Story Land ===
- On April 27, 2022, a 49-year-old man from Brazil was arrested and charged with felony child abuse after beating up his adopted 5-year-old autistic son over buying a toy lightsaber in Toy Story Land. According to authorities, the child became agitated after the man refused to buy the lightsaber, in which the man slapped and punched the child in the face after the child bit him in the arm, as well as him kneeing the child while dragging him on the concrete floor. An off-duty Southaven, Mississippi police and FBI task force officer jumped into action to halt the abusive actions. After being taken into custody, the officer told Orange County deputies that "the type of beating he observed could not be mistaken for 'corporal punishment'".

=== Toy Story Mania ===
- On July 8, 2022, a 41-year-old man from Clifton, New Jersey, who was diagnosed with brain cancer, was arrested for child abuse charges after sparking a brawl between the man and two teenaged boys, who jumped in front of him during an altercation at Lightning Lane at Toy Story Mania. Following the altercation, the 41-year-old man and the two teenagers were all banned from entering Disney World property.

=== The Twilight Zone Tower of Terror ===
- On September 13, 1998, there was a minor accident on the Tower of Terror which sent seven individuals to hospitals. The car dropped a few feet as normal, but the force from the car snapped both of the elevator cables, causing the car to free fall one floor down before the emergency brake activated. In a report from building inspectors, two of three bolts responsible for the pulley mechanism of the elevator were broken off. Seven individuals were treated and released for neck and back pains.
- On July 12, 2005, a 16-year-old girl from Kibworth, Leicestershire, United Kingdom, complained of a severe headache and other symptoms after riding the Tower of Terror. She was taken to Celebration Hospital in critical condition, where she underwent surgery for intracranial bleeding. On August 6, 2005, she returned to the United Kingdom via air ambulance. While she had reportedly ridden the attraction several times during her visit with no ill effects, she had been in pain for a few days prior to the incident. She had an extremely large stroke leading to cardiac arrest. After an examination by both Disney and state inspectors showed no ride malfunction, the ride was reopened the next day. She returned home safely after spending six months in the hospital due to two heart attacks and surgery. On February 13, 2009, the victim's family sued Disney for negligence in the ride's design, failing to adequately warn riders, and not providing proper safety restraints. They were seeking at least US$15 million. The lawsuit was voluntarily dismissed in 2012.

=== Other incidents ===
- On February 8, 1990, a 19-year-old employee from Apopka, Florida, died after falling 33 feet from a scaffold while working on an air-conditioner at the park's sound stage. He was pronounced dead after arriving at Orlando Regional Medical Center.

== Epcot ==
=== Body Wars ===
- On May 16, 1995, a 4-year-old girl from Galveston, Texas, with a known heart condition lost consciousness during a ride on the Body Wars attraction in the Wonders of Life pavilion. The ride was immediately stopped and paramedics airlifted her to Orlando Regional Medical Center, where she was pronounced dead. An autopsy was inconclusive as to whether the ride had aggravated her condition.

=== Mission: Space ===
- From the attraction's opening through June 1, 2005, paramedics were called for 194 Mission Space riders. Dizziness, nausea, and vomiting were the most common complaints, according to Reedy Creek Fire Department records. Out of the 194 riders, 25 people fainted, 26 had difficulty breathing, and 16 reported irregular heartbeats or chest pain.
- On June 13, 2005, a 4-year-old boy from Sellersville, Pennsylvania, died after riding Mission: Space. An autopsy by the Orange County Medical Examiner's Office released on November 15, 2005, found that the boy died as a result of an existing, undiagnosed idiopathic heart condition called myocardial hypertrophy. On June 12, 2006, his parents filed a lawsuit against Disney, claiming that Disney should have never allowed a 4-year-old on the ride due to the ride's height restriction for size over 44 inches (110 cm), and did not offer an adequate medical response after he collapsed and later died. A settlement between the child's parents and Disney was reached in October 1, 2006, and the lawsuit was voluntarily dismissed on January 30, 2007.
- On April 12, 2006, a 49-year-old woman from Schmitten, Hesse, Germany, fell ill after riding Mission: Space and died at Florida Hospital Celebration Health hospital in nearby Celebration, Florida. An autopsy determined that she died from a brain hemorrhage caused by longstanding and severe high blood pressure; there was no evidence of trauma attributable to the ride.

=== Parking lot ===
- On November 21, 1984, a husband and wife, along with their 1-year-old daughter, were killed and two other children were injured when the single-engine plane they were flying in crashed while attempting an emergency landing in the Epcot parking lot. The Piper aircraft was approaching an empty section of the parking lot when it clipped a light pole, shearing off the right wing, and crashing into several parked cars. The family was flying from Greer, South Carolina, to Kissimmee, Florida, for a Disney World vacation.
- On January 14, 1986, the bodies of a 33-year-old man and his 57-year-old mother, both from Massachusetts, were discovered floating in a retention pond after they drove their Chevrolet Chevette down an embankment and into the water during a heavy rainstorm several days earlier. Authorities speculate that the two attempted to escape from the vehicle through the driver's side window as it sank into the six-foot-deep water. The vehicle's lights and windshield wipers were found in the "on" position, leading authorities to believe that the driver lost visibility during the rainstorm, jumped a curb, and slid down an embankment into the pond.

=== Spaceship Earth ===
- On August 14, 1999, a 5-year-old boy was seriously injured after exiting a ride car. He was treated for an open compound fracture at the Orlando Regional Medical Center.

=== Test Track ===
- On January 29, 2018, a 20-year-old Venezuelan man was accused and charged with felony lewd and lascivious behavior after he allegedly groped an 8-year-old boy on the ride. The boy and his mother were seated next to the man who put one of his arms around the boy's chest, his hand on the boy's knee, and touched the boy's groin during the ride. He was arrested shortly thereafter, although he claimed it was an accident.
- On June 30, 2025, during a cast member preview, a ride vehicle collided with doors to the exterior section of the ride after the doors failed to open as the vehicle approached, resulting in injuries to four riders. As a result of this collision, the doors no longer slide open as a car approaches and are fixed in their open position.

=== Other incidents ===
- On October 22, 1982, three weeks after its opening, a 21-year-old senior Mississippi Valley State College band student from Liberty, Mississippi, suffered both neck and spinal cord injuries after one of the park's ramp platforms fell on him during rehearsal in connection of a scheduled special performance at Epcot. Authorities later confirmed that the entirety of the 450-piece band were performing on a large roof at Epcot property when the accident happened. He was flown by helicopter to Orlando Regional Medical Center before being transported to the Luecerne General Hospital in Orlando where he remained at intensive care for days.
- On May 1, 1985, a 42-year-old dancer from Mexico suffered serious injuries after falling 30 feet from a pole during a stunt with a troupe in the Mexico pavilion. He was later taken to Orlando Regional Medical Center in critical condition, where he recovered from his injuries. Authorities confirmed that the man was climbing halfway up a 60-foot pole during a performance at the center of the pavilion when he slipped and fell, and was among the four dancers climbing the pole.
- Epcot became national headlines following the January 26, 1986 arrest of former Columbia, South Carolina, police chief and Downers Grove, Illinois, police officer Arthur Hess after failing to appear in federal court in July 1985 for an appeal in connection of his misconduct and obstruction of justice arrest in 1981 during his final hours as the chief of the Columbia Police Department. Hess, alongside co-worker Mary Davis McEachern, also from Columbia, were both arrested that day while spending time at Epcot after being missing for eight months following McEachern's car being discovered in Augusta, Georgia, completely covered in human blood stain. Both of the missing were living in Tampa at the time of their arrests.
- On August 1, 1987, a 27-year-old male cast member from Winter Garden was killed when the ultralight plane he was flying crashed during a show rehearsal. He was practicing for Epcot's "Skyleidoscope" show at an altitude of 500–1000 feet when the ultralight suffered catastrophic structural failure, nosediving into the ground about 150 yards from Disney's airfield and 1.5 miles from Epcot.
- On September 12, 1992, a 37-year-old man named Allan J. Ferris, from Rochester, New York, entered Epcot after the park closed its gates for the night, and brandished a shotgun at three security guards, demanding to see his ex-girlfriend who worked at the park. He fired four blasts at the guards and took two guards hostage in a restroom near the Journey Into Imagination pavilion. As Orange County sheriff's deputies surrounded the area, the man released his hostages and emerged from the restroom with the shotgun held to his chest. After exchanging words with deputies, he put the gun to his head and fired. He was pronounced dead on arrival at the Orlando Regional Medical Center. Investigators attributed his actions to a recent breakup with his long-time girlfriend.
- On October 12, 2013, a 24-year-old intoxicated Navy officer, originally from Pensacola, Florida, and assigned to Naval Air Station Whiting Field, was arrested with battery-related charges during Epcot's annual International Food and Wine Festival after entering a backstage office area in Epcot, punched two Disney World male workers in the head and struck a female patron with a PVC pipe. He was taken into custody and was released the following day.
- On October 24, 2016, Orange County deputies arrested a 61-year-old man from Abita Springs, Louisiana, and banned him from entering Disney World property after attempting to enter Epcot with a loaded gun. Disney security confirms that the man attempted to hide a Smith & Wesson Bodyguard 380 semiautomatic pistol while an officer directed the man to walk through a metal detector. The man told investigators that he realized he had the gun in his backpack as he was riding the Disney transportation bus to Epcot and did not want to go back to his hotel room to put it away. He put the gun between his back and pants until Disney security recovered the weapon.
- On November 5, 2017, a runner collapsed and died near the finish line of the Disney Wine & Dine Half Marathon in the Epcot parking lot. No other details were initially disclosed.
- On August 18, 2018, a 49-year-old cast member named Brian Christ was found dead inside a burning car near Disney's Fantasia Gardens Miniature Golf Course in the park's resort area. An Orange County Sheriff's deputy said that the death was not suspicious, but declined to announce the cause of death or the cause of the fire. The death was later ruled as a suicide, due to disturbing messages he posted on his Facebook account before his death.
- On March 12, 2019, a 58-year-old worker from Winter Garden died in an industrial incident behind the France Pavilion. No details are available on the cause of his death, but it is believed he fell from the roof where the attraction Remy's Ratatouille Adventure was being developed.
- On November 1, 2019, a 58-year-old man from Ellis County, Texas, named Mark Lockridge died while participating in Disney's Wine & Dine Weekend 5 km race. The victim collapsed while running on the course. The medical examiner stated the cause of death to be hypertension and heart disease.
- On February 9, 2023, a 33-year-old intoxicated man from Coweta, Oklahoma, was taken into custody after trespassing through Epcot an hour after closure and assaulting an Epcot worker by throwing stanchions and tables at him. A guest experience manager saw the man lying outside on the ground in the rain near the World Showcase Promenade about an hour after closing time. The worker tried to assist a friend who was with him. While waiting for a wheelchair, the man allegedly became aggressive and began shouting after getting to his feet. Deputies said that he then picked up a stanchion and attempted to both swing it and throw it at the manager. The stanchion was tethered to a second stanchion preventing him from striking anyone with it. He then picked up the stanchion a second time and then slammed it on the ground before being restrained by a Samaritan. After a few minutes, he picked up a table and threw it over the railing. The man was ushered off the property before he was taken into custody and being released from bond afterward, while the manager was treated at a nearby hospital for strained muscles in his neck, shoulder, and back. Documents reported that the man was intoxicated, and removed his Hawaiian shirt during the fight and threw the shirt at the manager.
- On March 29, 2023, several Disney security members caught a 36-year-old Elizabeth, New Jersey, man smoking a cigarette, watching pornography on his phone, and masturbating while riding Remy's Ratatouille Adventure alone, all on surveillance. During the ride, a cast member stopped the attraction and made a loudspeaker announcement that smoking was not permitted. When the ride continued, the man looked at porn on his cell phone, put his hand down his pants, pulled his penis out in the open, and continued masturbating inside the ride cart. A cast member confirmed that he ejaculated once before leaving the ride vehicle.
- On March 30, 2023, just one day after the exposure incident at Remy's Ratatouille Adventure, another man was arrested for indecent exposure, with a Disney manager reporting him as "constantly causing issues inside the park." He was also charged with a misdemeanor for exposing his sexual organs. He reportedly threw items on the ground while authorities escorted him out of the park and exposed his penis again while waiting for a taxi as a sheriff's deputy filled out trespass paperwork.
- On January 30, 2024, a 38-year-old former Brookline, Massachusetts, police officer, who was honored as 2021's "Officer Of The Year" in his hometown, was arrested, taken to a nearby hospital, and later in custody after he allegedly assaulted two Disney World security guards and an Orange County Sheriff's deputy at the entrance leading to Epcot. The Brookline Police Department placed the man on paid administrative leave following the incident.
- On June 16, 2024, a 46-year-old intoxicated man and his 24-year-old son from Lake Wales, Florida, were taken into custody after fighting with a female cast member leading to both punches and shirts flying near the entrance of the Space 220 Restaurant. According to authorities and witnesses, the 46-year-old father charged in front of the employee like a football player before hitting her with his hand. She fell back on the ground and radioed for help before she punched him in the cheek and face. His 24-year-old son came to help his father before punching a manager. His father then grabbed a metal pole and swung it around before both men were taken into custody shirtless. While both men were taken by Orange County deputies, one of the men resisted in front of officers by shouting death threats to the cast member.
- On November 16, 2024, two 25-year-old men, one from Plantation and the other from Fort Lauderdale, were arrested following an argument with a woman in a wheelchair at both the France Pavilion and the Land Pavilion. Orange County deputies banned the Plantation man from entering Disney World properties.
- On January 1, 2025, a 24-year-old intoxicated man from Port Orange, Florida, was arrested on multiple charges after destroying a merchandise kiosk at Epcot while wearing only his underwear during the early morning hours. Disney security reached out to the Orange County Sheriff's Office when they noticed that he attempted to urinate into the bushes in public on the walkway between Epcot and Disney's Hollywood Studios. Following his arrest with third-degree felony criminal mischief and two misdemeanors for disorderly intoxication and trespassing, Disney security immediately banned the man from entering Disney World property.
- On December 11, 2025, a man in his 60s was found dead from a medical episode at the World Showcase.
- On January 1, 2026, an unidentified Uber driver was shot and wounded by a 21-year-old Disney employee from Kissimmee during an argument involving a tip dispute regarding an extended stop at Epcot's Red Lot cast parking. Orange County deputies arrested the man and charged him with shooting into an occupied vehicle, discharging a firearm in public, possession of a weapon by a convicted felon, battery and criminal mischief.
- On October 6, 2026 a tourist jumped off the boat and dove into the water inside in Gran Fiesta Tour Starring The Three Caballeros.

=== Fire breakouts ===
- On March 22, 2025, a large fire broke out in the France Pavilion area near Remy's Ratatouille Adventure, which forced riders to evacuate. A Walt Disney World spokesperson told WKMG-TV that the fire started from a walk-in cooler in the backstage area of the France Pavilion, but the majority of the cause remains unknown. No injuries were reported, and no buildings were damaged.
- On May 11, 2025, a popcorn cart caught fire sustaining serious damage from severe smoke near the edge of World Nature and World Celebration. Cast members immediately put out the fire a few minutes later, and was confirmed that the fire started from its heater.
- On December 6, 2025, a second fire broke out in the France Pavilion area behind the Les Vins des Chefs de France kiosk. Visitors claim that the fire was started by a discarded cigarette, although was not yet confirmed by cast members what caused the fire. Authorities confirmed that the cast members arrived on-scene by boat, who quickly extinguished the flames by a fire extinguisher.

== ESPN Wide World of Sports Complex ==
- On July 9, 2010, a 50-year-old electrician from Davenport, Florida, was electrocuted while working on a site near an electrical transformer.
- On April 17, 2022, a young boy had two of his fingers amputated after injuring his hand on a metal sign near the baseball field. His parents filed a lawsuit seeking more than $30,000 in damages and medical bill coverage in response to his injuries sustained after the incident.

== Magic Kingdom ==
=== Construction ===
- During its final months of construction on July 6, 1971, a 61-year-old male construction worker from Fleming, New York, (who lived in Bradenton, Florida, at the time) was crushed to death by sheet metal that dropped 30 feet from a crane hoist. Another man was injured but was later taken to a nearby hospital in fair condition. Authorities later identified the male victim as an employee from the W.E. Arnold Construction Company, which at the time was under contract with U.S. Steel.

=== Backstage ===
- On December 20, 1989, 800 Disney employees fled the Central Shop building at the Magic Kingdom after a fire in a craftsman's oven spewed smoke throughout the building. A total of 14 employees were taken to the Sand Lake hospital with breathing difficulties, all of whom survived.
- On February 11, 2004, 38-year-old cast member Javier Cruz, dressed as Pluto, who had worked at the park for eight years, died at the Magic Kingdom when he was run over by the Beauty and the Beast float in the Share a Dream Come True Parade. Disney representatives commented that "very few... if any" guests had seen the incident. This led OSHA to fine Disney US$6,300 for having employees in restricted areas.

=== Big Thunder Mountain Railroad ===
- On February 1, 2017, a 54-year-old man died after riding the attraction. His cause of death was believed to be natural causes, as he had a pre-existing medical condition. A Disney spokesperson said the ride was operating as normal.
- On May 22, 2023, a 44-year-old man collapsed and died after riding the attraction. A later report detailed that he died from natural causes.

=== It's a Small World ===
- On August 18, 1994, a 6-year-old girl from Miami fell out of one of the ride's boats while it was in the loading area. Orange County authorities believe an incoming boat then struck her after the fall. The girl suffered a broken hip, a broken arm, and a collapsed lung. Paramedics took her to a hospital and she was able to recover fully from her injuries. The ride was closed for an inspection and reopened the following day.
- On December 25, 2014, a 22-year-old woman lost consciousness after riding the attraction and later died. The woman had a pre-existing condition.
- On July 1, 2026, a small fire broke out from one of the ride's boats after a guest's personal phone charger caught fire. Cast members reacted quickly and immediately put it out, and ride operations resumed shortly after the incident.

=== Main Street, U.S.A. ===
- On August 11, 1977, a 4-year-old boy from Dolton, Illinois, drowned in the moat surrounding Cinderella Castle. His parents sued for negligence and were awarded compensation of $1.5 million.
- On May 24, 1988, a 3-year-old boy from Philadelphia, Pennsylvania, with a congenital heart defect collapsed while shopping at the Magic Shop on Main Street. Disney officials arrived on scene before the Reedy Creek Fire Department took the boy to Sands Hospital, where he was pronounced dead.

=== PeopleMover ===
- On January 10, 1987, a fire broke out in a tunnel essential to the attraction, which caused the closure of the entirety of Tomorrowland for almost two hours. There were no injuries, and authorities confirmed that arson was ruled out following investigation.
- On September 25, 2022, an 83-year-old man from West Palm Beach experienced a fatal heart attack and lost consciousness whilst riding the attraction. CPR was carried out after the ride had finished. The man was taken to Celebration Hospital but was pronounced dead at 5:04 p.m. The cause of death was reported as natural causes due to a pre-existing condition.

=== Peter Pan's Flight ===
- On February 14, 2006, a 70-year-old man suffered life-threatening injuries after falling from the conveyor belt and becoming pinned underneath a ride vehicle. The ride temporarily shut down operation that evening.

=== Pirates of the Caribbean ===
- In June 1989, a 10-year-old boy from Asheville, North Carolina, named Luke Blalock was riding Pirates of the Caribbean with his family when another boat rammed into the side of the boat they were on. This impact amputated his right thumb, which was resting on the side of the boat. As a result of his injuries, the boy was later rewarded $881,895 by jury for medical costs, pain, and suffering.
- On February 1, 2005, a 77-year-old Minnesota woman lost consciousness and died after riding the Pirates of the Caribbean. A medical examiner's report said the victim was in poor health and she had several ministrokes. The report concluded that her death "was not unexpected."
- On August 6, 2009, a 47-year-old performer in the "Captain Jack's Pirate Tutorial" show slipped on a puddle of water on the stage and hit his head on a wall. He died of complications from the fall four days later at Florida Hospital in Orlando.
- On July 10, 2014, a 57-year-old man from the United Kingdom was hospitalized after losing the tips of his ring and pinky fingers on his right hand while riding the Pirates of the Caribbean. The guest had his hand outside of the ride vehicle at the time of the incident. The ride was shut down briefly for inspection and later reopened after it was deemed safe.

=== Skyway ===
- On May 23, 1982, a 20-year-old worker was standing near the ledge of the Fantasyland station when the Skyway started up; she grabbed onto a seat and traveled 100 feet (30 m) before a staff member stopped the ride. Some visitors climbed onto the roof of a nearby building, but could not reach her. She fell 15 feet (5 m) to the roof, slid off, and dropped another 20 feet (6 m) to the ground; she injured her back but survived.
- On February 14, 1999, a 65-year-old part-time custodian from Clermont, Florida, was killed when he fell off a seat. He was cleaning the Fantasyland Skyway station platform when the ride was turned on by staff who were likely unaware that he was there. He was in the path of the ride vehicles and grabbed a passing seat in an attempt to save himself. He lost his grip, fell 40 feet (12 m), and landed in a flower bed near the Dumbo ride. He was pronounced dead on arrival at Orlando Regional Medical Center. The Skyway ride, which had been scheduled to be closed before the accident occurred, was permanently closed on November 10, 1999. As a result of the accident, OSHA fined Walt Disney World US$4,500 for violating federal safety codes in that work area. The incident echoed a similar incident at Disneyland Resort in 1994, when a 30-year-old man fell 20 feet (6 m) out of a Skyway cabin and subsequently attempted to sue Disney. In that case, however, the man later admitted that he had in fact jumped out of the ride, and the case was dismissed.

=== Space Mountain ===
- Throughout its first 10 months of operation between January and October 1975, a total of 337 reports of both injuries and illnesses were reported according to Orange County court records, with a majority of the injuries being both serious and critical. The list of incidents throughout its first 10 months of operation includes one death, a 70-year-old man from Fort Lauderdale, who lost consciousness and died after being taken to a nearby hospital on May 16, 1975.
- On February 20, 1975, three of its capsule passenger carriers collided with each other for unknown reasons. No injuries were reported, but the ride remained closed for several days. Disney spokesman Roger Swanson replied that the accident happened at the "nearly-leveled low-speed track area" as the capsules were reaching the end of the line.
- On August 12, 1980, a 10-year-old girl from Caracas, Venezuela, became ill while riding Space Mountain. She later died of a pre-existing heart condition and hypoxia.
- On February 8, 1990, three visitors riding Space Mountain suffered injuries after three sets of cars automatically collided when the ride system halted due to a faulty wheel.
- In 1998, a 37-year-old man was hit on the head by a falling object. His left arm was paralyzed, and he suffered from short-term memory loss, losing his job as a result. Two objects were discovered at the bottom floor of Space Mountain: a camera and a candle from Frontierland.
- On August 1, 2006, a 6-year-old boy from Israel fainted after riding Space Mountain and was taken to Celebration Hospital, where he died. The victim was a terminal cancer patient visiting the Magic Kingdom as a part of the Give Kids the World program. The medical examiner's report showed that he died of natural causes due to a metastatic pulmonary blastoma tumor.
- On December 7, 2006, a 73-year-old man lost consciousness while riding Space Mountain. He was transported to a hospital and died three days later. The medical examiner found that the man died of natural causes due to a heart condition.
- On May 21, 2007, a brawl broke out after five intoxicated young people, all from Shirley, New York, swore and spat on other park guests near Space Mountain. The Orange County Sheriff's Office reported that a 19-year-old man was threatening security shortly before the brawl started, and an arriving officer used a taser on a 17-year-old girl after she allegedly punched a security officer and everyone came under control. All five (ranged from 14 to 20 years old) were arrested on charges of battery on a law enforcement officer and resisting arrest with violence, but only two were released with a $2,300 bond the following day.
- On July 7, 2015, a 55-year-old woman from Kingsport, Tennessee, died of cardiopulmonary arrest and septic shock at Florida Hospital Celebration after losing consciousness while on the ride. According to the medical examiner, her medical history showed a history of hypertension and congestive heart failure.

=== Splash Mountain ===
- On November 5, 2000, a 37-year-old man from St. Petersburg, Florida, was fatally injured while trying to exit the ride vehicle while it was moving. He told fellow passengers that he felt ill and attempted to reach one of the attraction's marked emergency exits. He was struck by the following ride vehicle and died at Celebration Hospital. His cause of death was blunt force trauma.
- In September 2018, a man from New York City was briefly banned from entering Disney World property after holding a "Trump 2020" sign while riding Splash Mountain, as political signs were prohibited from Disney property. His ban comes a few weeks after a similar incident at Expedition Everest where he held up a "Make America Great" sign during the ride. Following his ban, Disney revoked his longtime annual pass, which he had been using since 1994. According to a member, he replied that the contents of the man's sign was not an issue but rather that it violated park policies prohibiting the unauthorized use of any flag, banner or sign for commercial purposes or to incite a crowd. His ban was lifted two months later after agreeing to Disney to not bring anymore flags to Disney World property.

=== The Haunted Mansion ===
- On February 6, 1990, five people were slightly injured after wooden pieces of the ceiling molding fell on guests at the start of the ride's cycle. The cycle went into a jolted halt and every guest exited the ride safely. The five victims were treated for cuts and bruises.
- On October 19, 1991, a 15-year-old girl from Sarasota, Florida, was critically injured after she fell onto the ride's tracks. According to witnesses, she was jumping from car to car and fell onto the track, where she was dragged under a moving car for at least 50 feet (15.24 m) before the ride stopped. She was airlifted to Orlando Regional Medical Center where she underwent emergency surgery for head and facial injuries.
- In February 2007, an 89-year-old woman fell and broke her hip while exiting a ride vehicle.
- On July 31, 2018, a 24-year-old then-Disney World cast member from Winter Garden, Florida, entered a restricted area of the attraction and stole various costumes, props, and other items worth over $7,000. The suspect was arrested on May 17, 2019, and charged with burglary, grand theft, and dealing in stolen property.
- On April 12, 2021, a 66-year-old woman fell and broke her wrist while exiting the ride vehicle.

=== Tiana's Bayou Adventure ===
- In March 2025, a man and his young son jumped out of their log to find the attraction's exits. Ride operators paused the ride for 30 minutes before a security officer escorted the man and his child out. Following the incident, the man and his family were banned from entering Disney World property.

=== Cosmic Ray's Starlight Cafe ===
- On March 1, 2010, a 4-year-old boy from San Diego suffered severe face and neck burns after being scalded by a tray of hot nacho cheese. The accident occurred when the boy sat down to dinner in an unstable chair and grabbed a food tray to prevent himself from falling, resulting in the cheese falling off the tray and into his lap. The child's parents sued Disney, with their attorney claiming that "the cheese should not have been that hot" and that Disney made no effort "to regulate and monitor the temperature of the nacho cheese which was being served to young children." A Disney representative commented on the incident: "It's unfortunate when any child is injured. We just received notice of the lawsuit and are currently reviewing it." The family settled out of court in 2011.

=== Other incidents ===
- During opening week in October 1971, burlesque star Tempest Storm of Eastman, Georgia, became one of the first guests to be arrested on Disney World property. Authorities confirmed that she was arrested for violation of a city ordinance banning topless dancing after performing her own show at the Magic Kingdom, and was released with a $500 bond afterward.
- On August 9, 1972, two male employees, including a 20-year-old man from Kissimmee, were struck by lightning while working at the parking lot leading to the Magic Kingdom during a severe weather outbreak. Both men were taken to Orange Memorial Hospital and were released.
- On November 12, 1973, three Pennsylvania men, a 38-year-old from Dunbar, a 38-year-old from Elizabeth, and a 35-year-old from Pittsburgh were all taken into custody after Orange County deputies spotted the Greater Pittsburgh trio entering the Magic Kingdom with fake money. Secret Service agents told the Orange County Sheriff that the men attempted to pass counterfeit with $25, $50, and $100 bills and confiscating nearly $100,000 in bogus bills from the men.
- On January 27, 1975, a 39-year-old electrician from Titusville, Florida, was electrocuted while working on a tunnel with two other employees in the early morning hours. Orange County deputies later confirmed that the male victim received a 500-volt shock. He was found with his safety gloves nearby.
- On August 7, 1979, a 62-year-old woman from Baltimore, Maryland, drowned after falling into a drainage ditch in the parking lot. In 1981, her daughter filed a lawsuit against Disney for $3 million, contending that at nighttime, the drainage ramps appeared to be pedestrian walkways, and that there were no barriers preventing her mother from making her way onto one of the ramps and falling into the canal.
- On October 17, 1982, a 27-year-old man from York, Pennsylvania, was arrested after Disney security guards witnessed the man playing with a gauze-wrapped grenade patched with adhesive bandages while sitting on a bench near the Magic Kingdom. Authorities confirmed that an employee witnessed him playing with the grenade before contacting security guards and Orange County deputies, who questioned the man before covering it with a bomb blanket until technicians arrived. The man explained to authorities that the grenade was deactivated and had been purchased at the Army Surplus store in York. Authorities later recovered a gas mask and an empty first-aid box after his arrest.
- On December 29, 1997, nearly 100 anti-gay activists with Operation Rescue National protested near the entrance streets leading to the Magic Kingdom, which caused a minor slowdown. Several people were arrested for obstructing traffic and throwing advertising materials onto the streets, and were held in lieu of $500 bail. Operation Rescue members stated that the protest against what they called the "Tragic Kingdom" was prompted by Disney's tolerance of gay people.
- On May 29, 2007, a 34-year-old woman from Clermont, Florida, was attacked by a 51-year-old park guest from Anniston, Alabama, as they waited in line at the Mad Tea Party attraction. The attacker was convicted on charges of battery and sentenced to 90 days in jail; nine months of formal probation; and an anger management course. The victim and her husband later filed two separate lawsuits against Disney. Her lawsuit claimed, that Walt Disney World provided inadequate staff and security at the ride; there was a lack of adequate training to recognize security threats; that the park did not anticipate the attack and have the attacker removed before anything happened; and that the following investigation was mishandled. Her husband's lawsuit against Disney claimed the loss of his wife's support and companionship due to the attack. In 2011, a jury found in favor of Disney.
- On April 26, 2023, a 56-year-old man from Leesburg, Georgia, was arrested after groping a 21-year-old female cast member at the Magic Kingdom. He was taken into custody by Orange County on a count of battery and a single first-degree misdemeanor charge.
- On May 15, 2023, a brawl broke out at the Magic Kingdom Park entrance after one family asked another to move over so they could take a photo in front of the park's Disney 100th anniversary sign. The Orange County Sheriff's Office said at least one person received medical treatment after the fight, but that they declined to press charges. Two unspecified people were later banned from entering Disney World property.
- On October 7, 2024, a 35-year-old man from Flower Mound, Texas, was arrested for battery after he pushed a stroller with a child inside into a Disney employee during an argument.

=== Fire breakouts ===
- On November 4, 1974, a small explosion killed a 49-year-old Orlando carpenter and injured another at the maintenance area while working inside a half-finished 66-foot aluminum boat near the Magic Kingdom. Both men were taken to Orange Vista Hospital where one of the carpenters died from his injuries. The explosion happened nearly two hours after the theme park closed for the night. Orange County detectives reported that glue fumes ignited by the filament of a fluorescent light may have caused the explosion. On October 28, 1976, the widow of the carpenter filed a suit against 3M and the Traveler's Indemnity Company for the death of the carpenter.

== Disney's Typhoon Lagoon ==
=== Construction ===
- During construction on April 25, 1988, a 59-year-old construction worker from Donora, Pennsylvania, was killed and three other workers were injured after a 22-inch water pipe burst during a pressure test. The workers were in a trench getting ready to pour concrete around the pipe when a joint broke, knocking the pipe into the victims.

=== Miss Adventure Falls ===
- On December 8, 2018, a 44-year-old man was seriously injured when his arm got caught in the conveyor belt. Employees' attempts to free the man were unsuccessful. After being freed by fire rescue personnel, the man was flown to a hospital by helicopter to be treated for non-life-threatening injuries. The ride was closed the following day pending further investigation.

=== Wave pool ===
- During refurbishment on November 2, 2000, two unidentified male workers were crushed by a collapsed wall while resurfacing its structure near the wave pool. Both men were taken to Orlando Regional Medical Center in stable condition.
- On August 4, 2005, a 12-year-old girl from Newport News, Virginia, fell ill while using the wave pool. Lifeguards talked with her after noticing her lying down on the side of the pool; she said she felt fine, but lost consciousness shortly after standing up. Though lifeguards performed CPR on her until Reedy Creek paramedics arrived, she was pronounced dead shortly after arriving at Celebration Hospital. The autopsy showed that she died due to arrhythmia caused by an early-stage viral heart infection.

=== Humunga Kowabunga ===
- On October 14, 2019, a 30-year-old woman suffered severe intestinal and genital injuries while riding the Humunga Kowabunga water slide.

=== Other incidents involving guests ===
- On July 3, 2009, a 51-year-old man from Farmington, New York, was charged with lewd and lascivious molestation after allegedly attempting to remove swimsuits from five teenage girls while all were in the wave pool. Disney security was notified and they called for Orange County deputies.
- On July 10, 2009, a 51-year-old Connecticut man was charged with lewd and lascivious exhibition after he allegedly fondled himself in front of a teenage girl near the park's wave pool. The man denied the lewd conduct charges, claiming his European-style swimsuit was too small. This was the fifth sexual-related reported incident to occur at a Central Florida water park in 2009; the other parks aside from Typhoon Lagoon were Blizzard Beach, Aquatica, and Wet 'n Wild. The charges were dropped in August 2009 after prosecutors determined there was insufficient evidence in the case.
- On July 16, 2009, a 29-year-old man from Mountlake Terrace, Washington, was arrested and charged with one count of lewd and lascivious molestation of a 13-year-old boy. He was sentenced to two years in prison.
- On July 3, 2016, a 27-year-old Indian national from Baton Rouge, Louisiana, was arrested and charged with four counts of lewd and lascivious molestation on a child over 12 years old but under the age of 16, and two counts of battery on accusations of groping six people in the wave pool. The man was released on bond a few days later. He stated that his actions were accidental, and that he did not have his glasses on. He was permanently banned from entering Disney World property. In 2021 he entered a plea of not guilty to all charges.

== Characters ==
=== Costume-related issues ===
In 2005, Walt Disney World reported 773 injuries to OSHA for employees portraying any of 270 different characters at the parks.

- Of those injuries listed, 282 (roughly 36%) were related to costuming issues such as a costume's weight affecting the head, neck, or shoulders.
- 49 injuries (6%) were specifically due to the costume's head.
- 107 injuries (14%) were caused by park guests' interactions with the characters where the guest hit, pushed, or otherwise hurt (intentionally or not) the costumed cast member.
- Other items in the report include skin rashes, bruises, sprains, or heat-related issues.

One change that Disney made to assist character performers was to change rules limiting the overall costume weight to be no more than 25% of the performer's body weight.

=== Guest altercations and other incidents ===
- On May 15, 1985, a mother of a 6-year-old boy from Parsippany, New Jersey, filed a suit against Walt Disney World after her son was assaulted by an intoxicated male employee dressed as Mickey Mouse. On June 28, 1983, her then-4-year-old son ran across the bridge leading to the Cinderella Castle in excitement to meet up with Mickey. The cast member dressed as Mickey then picked up the child and threw him against the wall of the castle. Bystanders eventually separated the man from the child. She said that a few other employees wearing characters joined in, but all including the man in the Mickey costume subsequently walked away. The child was taken to a nearby hospital for psychiatric treatment.
- On April 1, 2004, a 36-year-old Disney cast member from St. Cloud, Florida, was arrested for allegedly fondling a 13-year-old and her mother while he was dressed as Tigger during a photo opportunity at Magic Kingdom's ToonTown on February 21, 2004. Originally charged with one count of simple battery and one count of lewd and lascivious molestation of a child between 12 and 15 years old, the case went to trial, during which the defense produced the Tigger costume to demonstrate the difficulties of maneuvering the costume's oversized gloves and the actor's limited line of sight in the costume. After less than an hour of deliberation, the jury acquitted the employee of all charges. He pleaded not guilty to the charges he faced during his testimony on August 3, 2004, and he returned to work at Disney later that month after a suspension.
  - On September 15, 2004, the same cast member was suspended again for allegedly shoving two other employees while he was dressed as Goofy at Animal Kingdom. Initially, the two employees believed that Goofy was their friend joking around until they saw the cast member relaxing backstage while partially out of costume. During the investigation, two other Animal Kingdom employees came forward saying the cast member had touched their breasts. The lawyer claimed that the cast member was merely looking at their lanyards containing lapel trading pins.
- On January 5, 2007, a 14-year-old boy from Greenville, New Hampshire, was allegedly punched in the head by a 31-year-old Disney employee from Kissimmee, Florida, dressed as Tigger during a photo opportunity at Disney's Hollywood Studios. The family felt that the act was deliberate and filed a police report of battery against the suspect. The cast member was suspended pending the results of the investigation. In the statement to the sheriff's office, he claimed that he was acting in self-defense as the child was pulling on the back of the costume and causing him to lose his breath. On February 15, 2007, the State Attorney General's office announced that no charges would be filed against the employee.
- On June 7, 2009, a 60-year-old man from Cressona, Pennsylvania, allegedly groped a cast member dressed as Minnie Mouse while visiting Magic Kingdom's ToonTown. The case went to trial on August 11, 2009. The man was convicted of charges of misdemeanor battery and he was sentenced to 180 days of probation and 570 hours of community service.
- On August 12, 2010, a 27-year-old woman from Upper Darby Township, Pennsylvania, filed a lawsuit against Disney claiming that a cast member in costume as Donald Duck had groped her during a photo and autograph session while on a family vacation in May 2008. The lawsuit was for $200,000 in damages to compensate the alleged victim for negligence, battery, and infliction of emotional distress. The woman claimed to suffer from severe physical injury, emotional anguish, acute anxiety, headaches, nightmares, flashbacks, and other emotional and physical ailments. Disney settled the lawsuit with the claimant for an undisclosed amount in 2011.
- On November 2, 2019, a 51-year-old sex offender was arrested and charged with battery after groping a cast member playing Ariel during a meet-and-greet.
- Three separate incidents involving employees dressed as characters were reported within a day apart in December 2019.
  - On December 3, a woman in her 60s asked a female cast member playing Donald Duck at a meet-and-greet in the Animal Kingdom if she was allowed to kiss Donald. She consented to the kiss but the woman "proceeded to touch her body all over". When the employee attempted to move away, the woman grabbed hold of her, placed her hands inside the costume and frantically touched her chest over her bra. The woman was never charged due to her suffering from dementia.
  - On December 4, a female cast member playing Mickey Mouse in the Magic Kingdom was approached by a family of three when the grandmother patted Mickey on the head five times in an attempt to show her grandson that Mickey would not hurt him. The woman playing Mickey told investigators that it caused her to suffer neck strain, for which she sought treatment at a nearby hospital.
  - Later in the Magic Kingdom that same day, a 61-year-old man from Brewster, Minnesota, groped the chest of a 36-year-old female cast member playing Minnie Mouse while in a "meet and greet and photograph area". He was banned from Disney World property.

== Resort hotels ==
=== Disney-owned hotels ===
==== Disney's Art of Animation Resort ====
- On July 14, 2015, a 3-year-old child died after being found at the bottom of a resort pool.
- On June 25, 2017, a 5-year-old boy became separated from his parents while at the resort. The Reedy Creek Improvement District and the Orange County Sheriff's Office eventually found him drowning in one of the resort's pools. The boy was airlifted to Arnold Palmer Hospital for Children in critical condition, though he later recovered.
- On April 24, 2026, a sting operation led by Disney security and the Orange County Sheriff's Office led to the arrest of a female Disney cast member for theft from a public lodging establishment. Authorities confirmed that investigators rigged a vacant hotel room with hidden surveillance cameras, staged it to appear occupied, and placed a wallet with $300 cash in the room.

==== Disney's BoardWalk Inn ====
- On June 29, 2000, a waiter and a child were held hostage by the child's father in a hotel room over domestic issues. During the hostage situation, other guests were evacuated and given alternative accommodations in the resort. The man released the hostages and handed himself over to authorities in the early hours of June 30, 2000.
- On January 25, 2024, a fight broke out at the Belle Vue Lounge at Disney's BoardWalk Inn when a 61-year-old intoxicated Ohio man, who lived in Sebring, Florida, at the time of the incident, mocked a child with Down syndrome in a wheelchair at a neighboring table. When the child's mother confronted him, he responded by violently shoving her and slapping her husband in the face and punching him in the neck when he attempted to intervene. The suspect was taken to a nearby hospital for injuries sustained during the fight, then transported to the Orange County Jail after being medically cleared.

==== Disney's Caribbean Beach Resort ====
- On December 18, 2020, a 43-year-old female travel agent fell at the resort and died four days later from blunt force trauma to the head. The woman's death was deemed accidental since she apparently fell from a standing height, suffering a head injury.

==== Disney's Contemporary Resort ====
- On October 26, 1978, a 27-year-old man from Baltimore, Maryland, died in an apparent suicide at Disney's Contemporary Resort. Orange County deputies reported that the man wrote a suicide note, taped it on his chest, and jumped from the 12th floor of the balcony. Police also reported that the man had been arrested a few weeks prior to his death outside Disney's Polynesian Village Resort during the International Chamber of Commerce Congress, where deputies found the man sleeping on a beach near the hotel before the arrest. He was charged with burglary and possession of burglary tools, but the charges were later dropped. A spokesman at Disney stated that the man was not a registered guest at the hotel.
- On April 4, 1981, a 27-year-old man from Red Lion, Pennsylvania, died in an apparent suicide at Disney's Contemporary Resort after falling from the 15th floor housing the observation deck to the parking lot. An Orange County spokesman later ruled his death as a suicide.
- On January 4, 1983, a 31-year-old former employee from Kissimmee named Lester Oliver Sterling shot himself in the chest after shooting his wife with a handgun three times following an argument in the basement at Disney's Contemporary Resort. Both employees were taken to the Orange Vista Hospital, but Sterling was pronounced dead after arrival. The female victim in the shooting was also a hotel employee and made a full recovery after being transferred to Orlando Regional Medical Center. Sterling worked for Disney between 1981 and 1982, and was formerly convicted on February 1974 kidnapping and September 1975 Winter Park armed burglary charges.
- On November 12, 1992, an off-duty cast member died after falling outside the Top of The World restaurant on the Contemporary Resort's 15th floor. The cast member had been sitting on the ledge when a swarm of wasps appeared. The cast member lost his balance and fell to his death 11 stories below while trying to swat them away.
- On March 22, 2016, a death occurred at Disney's Contemporary Resort. The monorail's service was temporarily suspended while the Orange County Sheriff's Office investigated. Investigators announced that they believe that the person died by suicide. According to multiple sources, the person jumped to their death inside the central A-frame tower.
- On May 28, 2018, an intoxicated Arizona man was arrested at Disney's Contemporary Resort after he falsely told other guests an active shooter was in the resort. Panic soon followed and the resort was placed on lockdown until police arrived. The reports were traced back to the man, who was found hiding in bushes outside of the resort. In questioning, the man claimed he did it to get reactions from people for a class and his YouTube channel.
- On March 4, 2020, a woman died in an apparent suicide at Disney's Contemporary Resort. Deputies from the Orange County Sheriff's Office responded to the resort around 4 p.m. after receiving a call that someone may have jumped off of the building. Upon arrival they were assisted by Reedy Creek officials, they found an unresponsive woman who was later pronounced dead at the scene.
- On July 26, 2023, a 39-year-old man from Greendale, Wisconsin, accidentally fell to his death from a balcony at Bay Lake Tower at the Contemporary Hotel.
- On October 14, 2025, a 31-year-old woman from Naperville, Illinois, was found dead at the Contemporary Hotel. Media sources first reported that the victim died after being struck by one of the monorails, which runs right into the center of the Contemporary, but officials from the Orange County Sheriff's Office immediately denied that narrative. Orange County deputies ruled her death as suicide. The following day, the Orange County Medical Examiner released information in a statement, saying that the victim died from multiple blunt impact injuries from a jump.
- On October 23, 2025, a 28-year-old man from Palm Bay, Florida, died while staying at the Contemporary Hotel. According to investigators, the outdoor area near Bay Lake Tower was taped off, and a heavy presence of first responders was visible. Orange County later ruled his death as a suicide by blunt force trauma.

==== Disney's Fort Wilderness ====
- In July or August 1976, a 57-year-old General Motors worker from Dayton, Ohio, fell unconscious after skimming down a River Country slide into a pond. He was dragged out of the water several minutes later before being transported to the Orlando Regional Medical Center. He died from his injuries 11 days later.
- On August 22, 1980, an 11-year-old boy from Long Island died 11 days after swimming in the River Country water park next to the campground. The cause of death was determined to be primary amoebic meningoencephalitis, a brain infection caused by the microbe Naegleria fowleri, traces of which were found in the water.
- On August 9, 1982, a 14-year-old boy from Erie, North Dakota, drowned at River Country. He was pulled from the water at the River Country Cove about five minutes after the sliding down a 60 foot (18 m) slide into slightly less than 6 feet (1.75m) of water. He was pronounced dead at a hospital.
- On May 23, 1987, a 6-year-old boy from Cooper City, Florida, drowned in a swimming pool. The family later sued, stating that the resort should have had more than one lifeguard on duty to monitor the crowded pool and that the pool should have had a safety line between the shallow and deep ends.
- On July 10, 1989, a 13-year-old boy from Longwood, Florida, drowned at River Country. He was swimming with eight classmates and two counselors. Fifteen minutes later, another swimmer felt the boy under his feet in about five feet (1.52 m) of water and dragged him out. He was pronounced dead on arrival at Sand Lake Hospital.
- On October 21, 2025, a 60-year-old man was found unresponsive at the Cottontail Curl loop near the Fort Wilderness Resort and Campground. Police were called, and an automated external defibrillator was used at the scene. He was transported to AdventHealth Celebration, where he was pronounced dead after arrival at 8:26 a.m. ET that morning. Police ruled that the man died from natural causes.

==== Disney's Grand Floridian Resort & Spa ====
- On October 9, 1989, a 33-year-old woman from Glen Cove, New York, was killed when a small speedboat collided with a ferry boat. She and her eight-year-old son were broadsided by the ferry while trying to videotape friends and family members who were water skiing in the Seven Seas Lagoon. A crew member and a visitor on the ferry dove into the water and rescued her son. The boy was not hurt in the accident. The family sued Disney for $240 million, claiming that the ferry's operators should have seen the speedboat before it came so close.
- On June 14, 2016, Lane Graves, a 2-year-old boy from Elkhorn, Nebraska, was attacked by an alligator at 9:15pm on the shore of the Seven Seas Lagoon. His parents unsuccessfully tried to intervene and the boy was pulled into the water. His body was found at approximately 1:45pm the following afternoon, in the vicinity of where he went missing. The medical examiner ruled that the child died of "drowning and traumatic injuries." Since the incident, Disney has added warning signs and rope-barriers to waterways around the entire resort. For a short time, references to alligators were removed from a number of attractions, including the Jungle Cruise. A lighthouse sculpture paying tribute to Lane Graves was unveiled in 2017 at the resort near the incident's location.

==== Disney's Polynesian Village Resort ====
- On April 6, 1982, a 2-year-old girl from Sunrise, Florida, died after being injured outside a park restaurant. She was standing in line with her family outside the Coral Isle Coffee Shop when she and her 12-year-old sister were playing with a rope tied to a large menu board. The girls pulled on the rope and the board fell on top of the toddler, crushing her. She was pronounced dead on arrival at Orange Vista Hospital.

==== Disney's Pop Century Resort ====
- On March 12, 2013, a 13-year-old from Springfield, Missouri, drowned while swimming at the resort's "Hippy Dippy" pool. The boy drowned in the 4 foot (1.2 m) deep section of the pool and was pulled out by a paramedic who tried to revive him by CPR, but he later died at a hospital. There were no lifeguards on duty when the incident occurred.
- On July 3, 2016, a 7-year-old boy reported that he was groped by a youth baseball coach from Wisconsin in a resort pool. The coach was arrested and charged with four counts of lewd and lascivious molestation.
- On July 9, 2018, a 33-year-old technician from Tucson, Arizona, died in an industrial accident near the Pop Century and Caribbean Beach resorts. A Toro utility cart crushed the employee, knocking him unconscious. Workers could not lift the cart. Officials pronounced him dead at the scene.

==== Disney's Saratoga Springs Resort & Spa ====
- On September 4, 2018, a 56-year-old man from Brick, New Jersey, was arrested for making a false bomb threat after telling Disney World employees that an “evil organization sent him to blow the place up" on July 21 of that same year at Saratoga Springs Resort. Authorities searched through his hotel room, where no bomb-making materials were found.

=== Third-party hotels (current and former) ===
==== Swan & Dolphin Hotels ====
- On August 14, 1989, a 30-year-old male construction worker from Umatilla, Florida, died after accidentally falling seventeen stories from the twenty-third floor of the hotel while it was under construction.
- On November 5, 2008, a 54-year-old electrician from Rockledge, Florida, sustained major injuries in a power maintenance accident while working at one of the two substations at the Swan Hotel. He died of his injuries twenty days later. Two years later on November 15, 2010, the estate worker filed a wrongful death lawsuit against several of Disney entities or partners on its operation.
- On October 21, 2014, a suspicious object was found by a construction worker at the Walt Disney World Swan and Dolphin Resorts. While in response, Orange County deputies replied that the device was specifically made to look like a bomb and was found in a room under construction. Deputies evacuated five floors of the resort building. Investigators determined that the device was a hoax and was only made to look like an explosive. No arrests were made following investigation.

==== Doubletree Guest Suites ====
- On June 19, 2010, a man's dead body was discovered hanging in a tree next to the hotel's entrance. The manner of death was originally unknown but was later declared a suicide.

==== Guest Quarters Suite Resorts ====
- On August 16, 1992, a 10-year-old girl from Youngstown, Ohio, drowned in the hotel pool after taking a dive. Orange County deputies confirmed that the girl knew how to swim when the incident happened. Her parents also witnessed her dive before her death.

==== Howard Johnson's at Walt Disney Village ====
- On August 22, 1989, a double suicide occurred at the Howard Johnson's at Walt Disney Village. According to Orange County authorities, a 17-year-old boy from Tipp City, Ohio, and an 18-year-old girl from Kettering, Ohio, jumped from the 14th floor of the Howard Johnson hotel to the first floor restaurant around 45 minutes before midnight. Police later confirmed that both victims had a history of suicide attempts.

==== Island Resort Suites ====
- On July 2, 1991, a 25-year-old Miami man died after an hours-long standoff between Secret Service agents and the Orange County SWAT inside a room at the Island Resort Suites near Pleasure Island at Disney World property. Authorities confirmed that Secret Service agents received a call about a credit card fraud during the afternoon hours. As agents went inside to engage the suspect, the man attempted to grab one of the agent's guns before running off to the second floor where agents heard one gunshot being fired. The man returned to his room, where he was found deceased from a self-inflicted gunshot wound to the head. Orange County authorities ruled his death as a suicide.

==== JW Marriott Bonnet Creek ====
- On August 29, 2018, two workers on the site of a hotel that was under construction fell to their death when scaffolding around the building collapsed.

== Disney Springs ==
- On November 22, 1999, a 26-year-old man from Hawley, Pennsylvania, who was a member of the American World Cup rugby team, sparked a brawl with a 24-year-old man from Banksmeadow, Australia, in the parking lot leading to Pleasure Island after the rugby player spat at the 24-year-old man's wife. The Orange County Sheriff's Office broke up the battle and placed the two men in handcuffs for disorderly conduct. They later confirmed that the 26-year-old man was intoxicated after drinking with other U.S. teammates including players from Italy and Lebanon.
- Shortly after midnight on July 2, 2007, a homemade device similar to a pipe bomb exploded inside a trash can at the parking lot of Downtown Disney. No injuries or damages were reported.
- On December 25, 2015, a fight broke out at Bongo's Cuban Cafe between a 70-year-old man from Georgetown, Florida and the restaurant staff. The man claimed that he was tired of waiting for his food. He argued with the restaurant's general manager and threw a punch but missed. The man was escorted out of the restaurant after he grabbed a worker's bicep, which left a mark. At some point during the incident, customers on the floor below mistakenly reported hearing gunshots at the restaurant. The rumor immediately spread quickly, leading into a mass panic including a stampede. The suspect was found without a weapon and was charged with battery.
- On April 16, 2022, a 42-year-old severely intoxicated woman from Clearwater, Florida, was arrested and charged with child neglect after she abandoned her child at T-Rex Cafe. According to evidence, she drank a total of five double Grey Goose vodka drinks before asking an employee to watch her son while she went to her car to retrieve her credit card. She was later found asleep in her car and was arrested for a single count of child neglect.
- On May 27, 2022, a 35-year-old man from Palm Beach County, Florida, was both arrested and banned from entering Disney World property after he was caught carrying a pocketknife and a Glock handgun with two magazines and 48 rounds of ammunition while attempting to enter Disney Springs. According to a Disney Security guard, the man told the guard that he had the folding knife in his bag. He told him to show the guard where the knife is, and demands to search his bag. After looking through his bag, the guard recovered the gun right next to the knife. As he replied that there "is more than just a knife", the man turned around and walked away, leaving the property. He was arrested a short time afterward.
- On May 31, 2023, a 22-year-old man from St. Cloud, Florida, was arrested after being accused of grabbing two young girls at the World of Disney Store at Disney Springs within two days apart. In the first report which happened on May 30, a witness chased the man out of the store, but the man was able to get away, and the incident was immediately reported to Disney security. The second report happened the following day, where he grabbed the second victim while looking for keychains in one aisle of the store. Deputies were able to locate the man in the Orange garage, where he was arrested, taken into Orange County Jail, and charged with two counts of lewd and lascivious molestation.
- On October 5, 2023, a 42-year-old woman from Plainview, New York, died of anaphylactic shock after consuming a meal at Raglan Road Irish Pub. Her husband alleged in a wrongful death lawsuit in February 2024 that she alerted the waitstaff at the pub multiple times to her severe nut and dairy allergies and they inaccurately assured her that her food would be free of such allergens. Disney initially argued that the husband had agreed to clauses broadly requiring mandatory arbitration of any kind of dispute with the company when he signed up for a trial of the Disney+ streaming service in 2019 and again when he bought Epcot tickets in 2023. After extensive media coverage of the case, Disney later announced that they would "waive [their] right to arbitration", stating that, "At Disney, we strive to put humanity above all other considerations."
- On June 7, 2025, a 42-year-old man from Ocala, Florida, died after choking on a piece of steak at The Boathouse in Disney Springs. Staff members called security instead of 911, which caused a delay in summoning emergency medical services. Authorities confirmed that he suffered severe hypoxia and cardiopulmonary arrest and had been placed on a ventilator on the day before his death.
- On January 2, 2026, Orange County deputies discovered a deceased man at the Orange Garage at Disney Springs. No details were immediately released.

== Walt Disney World Speedway ==
- During Indy Racing League practice at Walt Disney World Speedway on January 24, 1997, Davy Jones hit the wall twice. The 1996 Indianapolis 500 runner-up sustained an internal head and neck injury in the crash and was airlifted to Orlando Regional Medical Center. The accident led to his brief retirement from racing.
- On April 12, 2015, a 36-year-old driving instructor was fatally injured and the driver was hospitalized with minor injuries after a crash during a run as part of the Exotic Driving Experience. The instructor was riding in the passenger seat of a Lamborghini Gallardo LP570-4 Superleggera, when the driver lost control and crashed into a metal guardrail. The Florida Highway Patrol investigated and announced that, while the decision to run vehicles clockwise (instead of counter-clockwise as the track was designed for) may have been a factor in the incident, it was an accident and no charges were filed against the driver since it occurred on private property.

== See also ==
- Amusement park accidents
- List of incidents at Disney parks
- Patrick Spikes
