= Baptist Health (Alabama) =

Hospital system in Central Alabama, United States

- Orlando Health

Geography
- Location: Central Alabama, United States

Organization
- Religious affiliation: Baptist

Services
- Emergency department: III
- Beds: more than 1,700 system-wide

History
- Founded: October 1, 2024

Links
- Website: baptisthealthal.com

Baptist Health is a network of hospitals, outpatient centers and clinics headquartered in Birmingham, Alabama. It is majority owned and operated by Orlando Health. The system is one of the oldest hospital groups in Alabama, with origins in the baptist churches of the Birmingham area.

== As Baptist Health System ==
Baptist Health System was founded in 1922 by the Birmingham Baptist Association. The nonprofit organization's first hospital was Birmingham Baptist Hospital, now known as Princeton Baptist Medical Center. The hospital merged with Montclair Hospital to form Baptist Health System. It was one of the largest healthcare providers in Alabama from the 1950s through the mid-2000s. Economic factors required the system to sell many of its small properties and ultimately forced the system to sell a majority stake of Montclair Baptist Medical Center to Plano, Texas-based Triad Hospitals. The majority stake was spun-off again in 2008 to Community Health Systems of Brentwood, Tennessee, and the property was renamed Trinity Medical Center. Trinity eventually closed the Montclair location after purchasing and renovating the unfinished Healthsouth Digital Hospital, now called Grandview Medical Center in Birmingham.

== As Brookwood Baptist Health ==
In late 2014, Tenet Healthcare announced it was interested in merging its 600-bed acute care hospital in Birmingham, Brookwood Medical Center, with Baptist Health System. On October 2, 2015, Tenet announced it had finalized the merger. The combined system has more than 1,700 beds across its five acute care hospitals and employs more than 7,000 people. The new system was renamed Brookwood Baptist Health, and unveiled a new logo in 2016.

== Tenet Sale ==
On August 5, 2024, Orlando Health of Orlando, Florida signed a definitive agreement to purchase Tenet's 70% stake in Brookwood Baptist Health, while keeping the religious affiliation. The deal closed on October 1 and the system was renamed Baptist Health.

== Acute Care Properties ==
Name	City	Area Served	Trauma Center	Beds
Baptist Health Brookwood Hospital	Homewood	North Central Alabama	Level III	633
Baptist Health Citizens Hospital	Talladega	Talladega, Sylacauga	Level III	122
Baptist Health Shelby Hospital	Alabaster	Shelby, Chilton and surrounding counties	Level III	192
Baptist Health Princeton Hospital	Birmingham	Greater Birmingham	Level III	~500
Baptist Health Walker Hospital	Jasper	Walker, Winston and Blount counties	Level III	267
Baptist Health Calhoun Hospital	Anniston	Northeast Central Alabama	Level III	375
