= Dan Bell =

American filmmaker (born 1977)

- Born: February 9, 1977 (age 49); Baltimore, Maryland, U.S.
- Occupations: Documentary filmmaker; cinematographer; presenter
- Years active: 2012–present

Dan Bell (born February 9, 1977) is an American filmmaker. He is best known for the Dead Mall documentary series, cataloging the 2010s urban decay phenomenon of foreclosed shopping malls.

== Dead Mall ==
For kids of the '80s especially, dead malls have a very strong allure. We were the last of the free-range kids, roaming around malls, not really buying anything, but just looking. To see all those big looming spaces so empty now – it's a childhood haunting.

— writer Gillian Flynn

Narrated by Bell, the moments chronicled in what Bryan Menegus of Gizmodo calls a "hypnotizing tour" throughout a "post-capitalist dystopia[n]" landscape of stores and shopping centers that went out of business during the early-to-mid-2010s' so-called "retail apocalypse". These videos received millions of views. Bell employs salvaged commercials, VHS tapes, retro-futuristic imagery and sound, and audio-visual collages and montages, underlying the uneasy themes. Malls featured in Bell's chronicles most notably include Owings Mills Mall, Bristol Mall, Burlington Center, Marley Station Mall, Voorhees Town Center, Rolling Acres Mall, Frederick Towne Mall, and Staunton Mall. The intros of episodes in the series often use clips of these videos that have been distorted or exaggerated in a surreal effect. Bell personally finds the Rolling Acres Mall episode to be the most unnerving, recalling the eerie image of frogs singing out loud in an abandoned mall:

They were in a pool in the elevator shaft[.] Can you imagine filming this and taking it back to the [1980s] and saying, 'This is what's going to happen in 30 years: There's going to be a frog in the food court'?

Steven Kurutz of The New York Times compared the series with its soothing voice-over and retro-synth vaporwave music to Michael Galinsky's time-capsule photo book Malls Across America, stating, "they evoke the same fuzzy '80s nostalgia[,] even as they offer an unsettling visual document of the retail apocalypse that changing consumer habits, e-commerce and economic disparity have wrought." Nostalgia—as noted by some by-gone store owners, viewers, and writer Gillian Flynn,—is also a driving force behind the late 2010s private and public interest in the dead-malls phenomenon because to some people, "[it] was more than just a store. It was part of the community." On the other hand, Bell received some negative reception from shopping mall owners and shareholders, to which he responded, "Malls contact me and are livid they are featured, but the reality is, what are they going to do?"

== Work ==
Filmography

Year	Title	Director	Producer	Role	Notes
2014–present	Dead Mall Series	Yes	Yes	Narrator	Documentary, also cinematography Features shopping malls
2015–present	Dead Motel Series	Yes	Yes	Narrator	Documentary, also cinematography Features abandoned motels, hotels and resorts
2016–2020; 2022	Another Dirty Room	Yes	No	Himself	Documentary/reality TV
2020	Closed for Storm	No	Yes	Producer	Production created by Canadian film studio Bright Sun Films
2022	Margie & Scott	Yes	Yes		Documentary

== Personal life ==
Bell, in his later teens, held various jobs at shopping mall stores: at a Macy's, a shoe store, and a leather-goods boutique. Bell currently lives in Baltimore, Maryland.
