= Closed for Storm =

2020 documentary film

- Directed by: Jake Williams
- Written by: Jake Williams
- Produced by: Dan Bell; Nicholas Novak; John Shaw; Darren Mercer
- Narrated by: Jake Williams
- Edited by: Zachary Rezowalli; Derek Russell
- Music by: Matthew Jordan Leeds
- Production company: Bright Sun Films
- Distributed by: MPX | Motion Picture Exchange; Gravitas Ventures
- Release dates: November 7, 2020 (NOFF); July 6, 2021
- Running time: 78 minutes
- Countries: United States; Canada
- Language: English

Closed for Storm is a 2020 documentary film by Canadian YouTube creator Jake Williams of Bright Sun Films. It focuses on Six Flags New Orleans, a Louisiana amusement park that has been abandoned since it was flooded during Hurricane Katrina in 2005.

The film was officially announced on January 17, 2020, in a video posted by Williams called "My Documentary Announcement." In July 2020, Williams previewed new clips of Closed for Storm on a podcast called Factual America. The documentary premiered at the New Orleans Film Festival on November 7, 2020. The film was released on streaming platforms in July 2021. The title of the film was based on the last message ever written on the main entrance sign to Six Flags New Orleans, in preparation for Hurricane Katrina in late-August 2005.
