= Bright Sun Films =

Canadian film studio

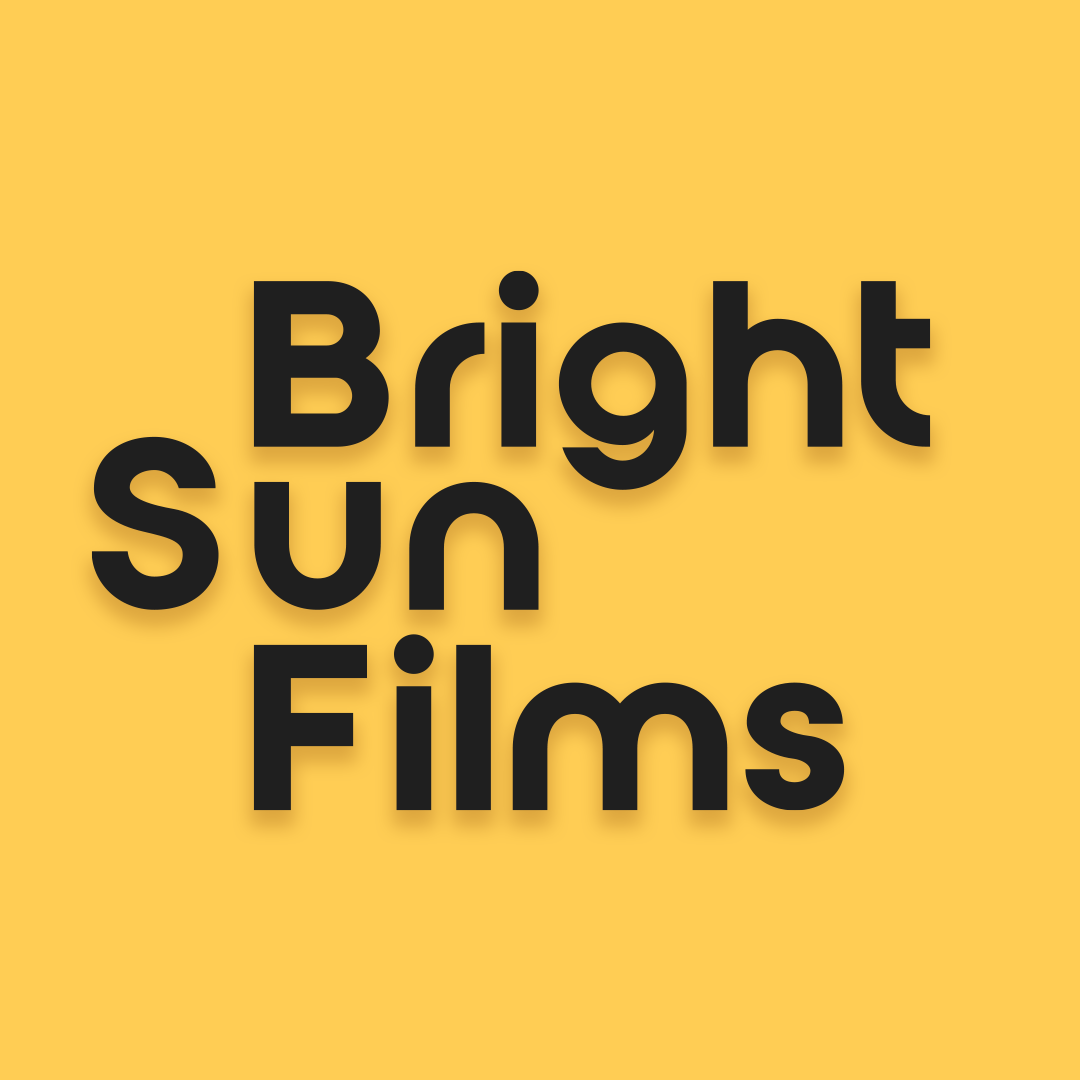
- The company's logo
- Type: Private
- Industry: Film
- Founded: June 12, 2020; 6 years ago
- Founder: Jake Williams
- Website: shopbrightsunfilms.com

Bright Sun Films Ltd. is a Canadian film production company known for its TV series' Abandoned, Cancelled, and Bankrupt, and its documentary, Closed for Storm.

== History ==
The studio was founded by Jake Williams in 2012 as the YouTube gaming channel Bright Sun Gaming. In 2014, Williams refocused the channel's content towards abandoned locations, causing him to later rebrand it to Bright Sun Films in 2016.

In 2020, Williams announced and released his first documentary, Closed for Storm, on November 7, 2020 during the New Orleans Film Festival. The film focused on Six Flags New Orleans, an amusement park that has abandoned since its flooding during Hurricane Katrina. It was released on the streaming platforms Tubi and VOD.

In March 2025, the studio partnered with White Lake Productions to announce the documentary, Stolen Kingdom, directed by Joshua Bailey, which was released during the Florida Film Festival on April 11, 2025. The film covers the 2018 theft of Buzzy, an animatronic from Walt Disney World's Epcot ride, Cranium Command.

In 2026 or 2027, the studio is slated to release a documentary on the decline of American malls; It was filmed at the Chesterfield Mall in Chesterfield, Missouri, which was chosen among a list of many malls that were being demolished at the time.

== Shows ==
=== Abandoned ===
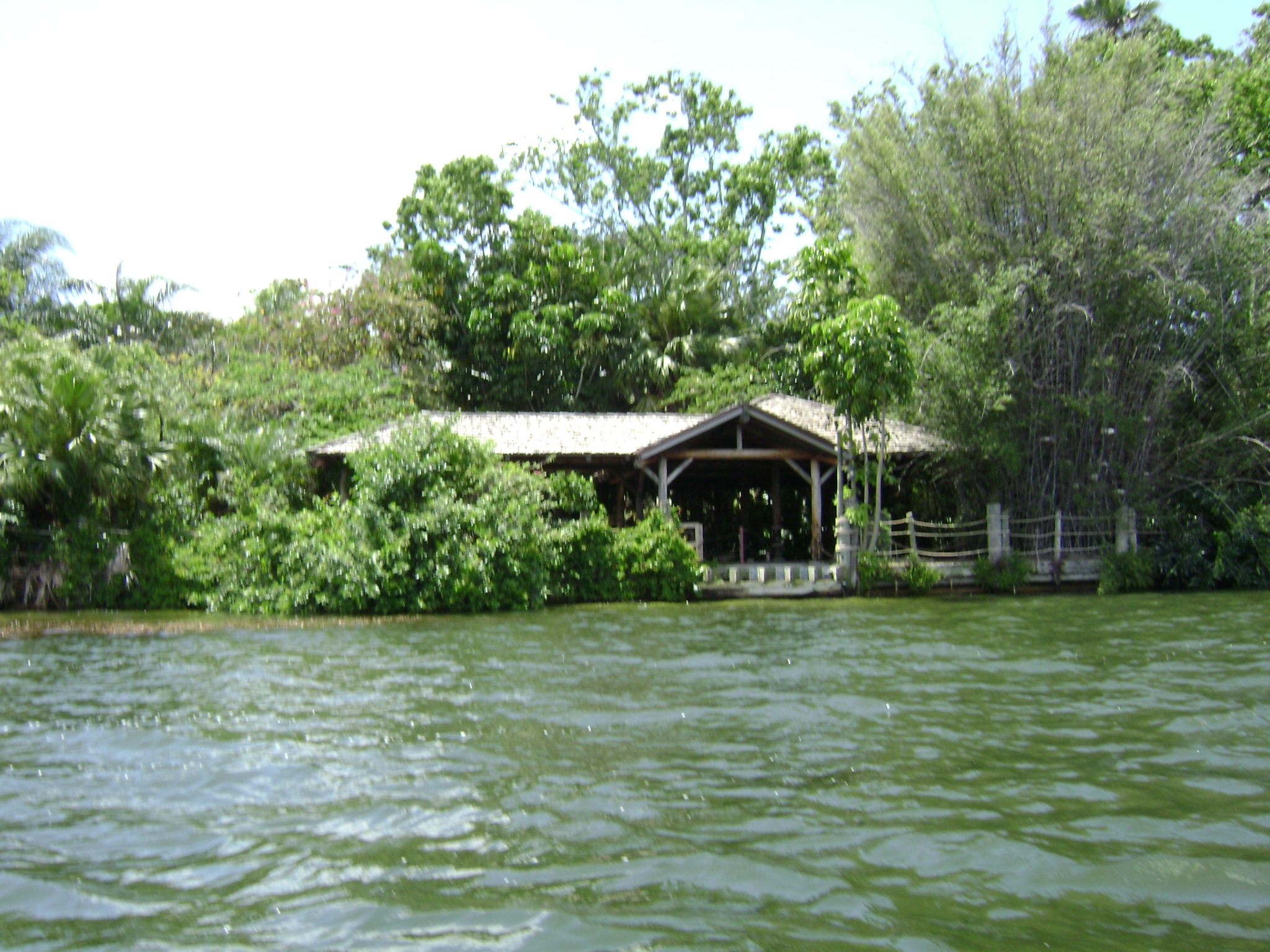
The studio covered Disney's Discovery Island in an episode of Abandoned.

Bright Sun Films is known for their show, Abandoned, which focuses on the topic of abandoned locations; they have covered notable places such as Disney's Discovery Island, Disney's River Country, Vancouver's McBarge, Circuit City, Schlitterbahn Kansas City, Kmart, and Geauga Lake.

"It's the unprecedented and truly surreal sight of seeing something that had been enjoyed by so many people just decay away." - A statement Williams made to Iowa Public Radio in 2022.

=== Cancelled ===
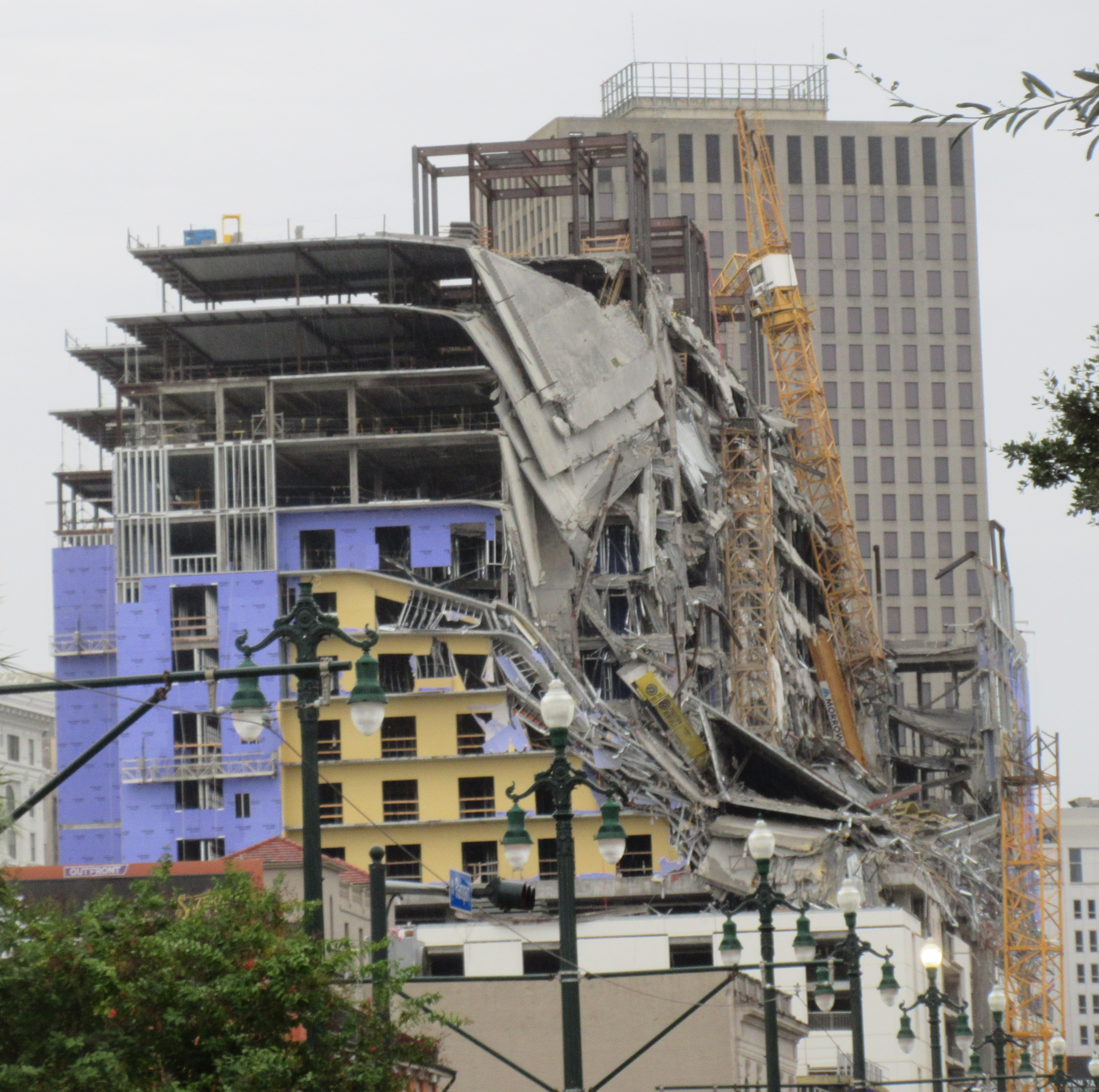
Jake has covered the partially collapsed Hard Rock Hotel New Orleans before.

The studio also created the show, Cancelled, which covers cancelled and failed projects such as Titanic II and Carnival's Project Pinnacle.

=== Explore ===
An episode of Explore on a home with an infinity pool

Another series created by the studio is Explore (formerly known as Abandoned Adventures). The show focuses on urbex, in which Williams documents himself exploring abandoned locations. Places that were covered include sites such as a former Days Inn, an abandoned a power center, City View Center, with Walmart as an anchor, and the SS United States.

== Awards ==
Bright Sun Films was nominated for Best YouTube Ensemble during the 11th Annual Shorty Awards in 2019.

== See also ==
- Defunctland
- Closed for Storm
- Stolen Kingdom
- Dan Bell, who explores dead malls
