= Stolen Kingdom =

2025 US documentary film

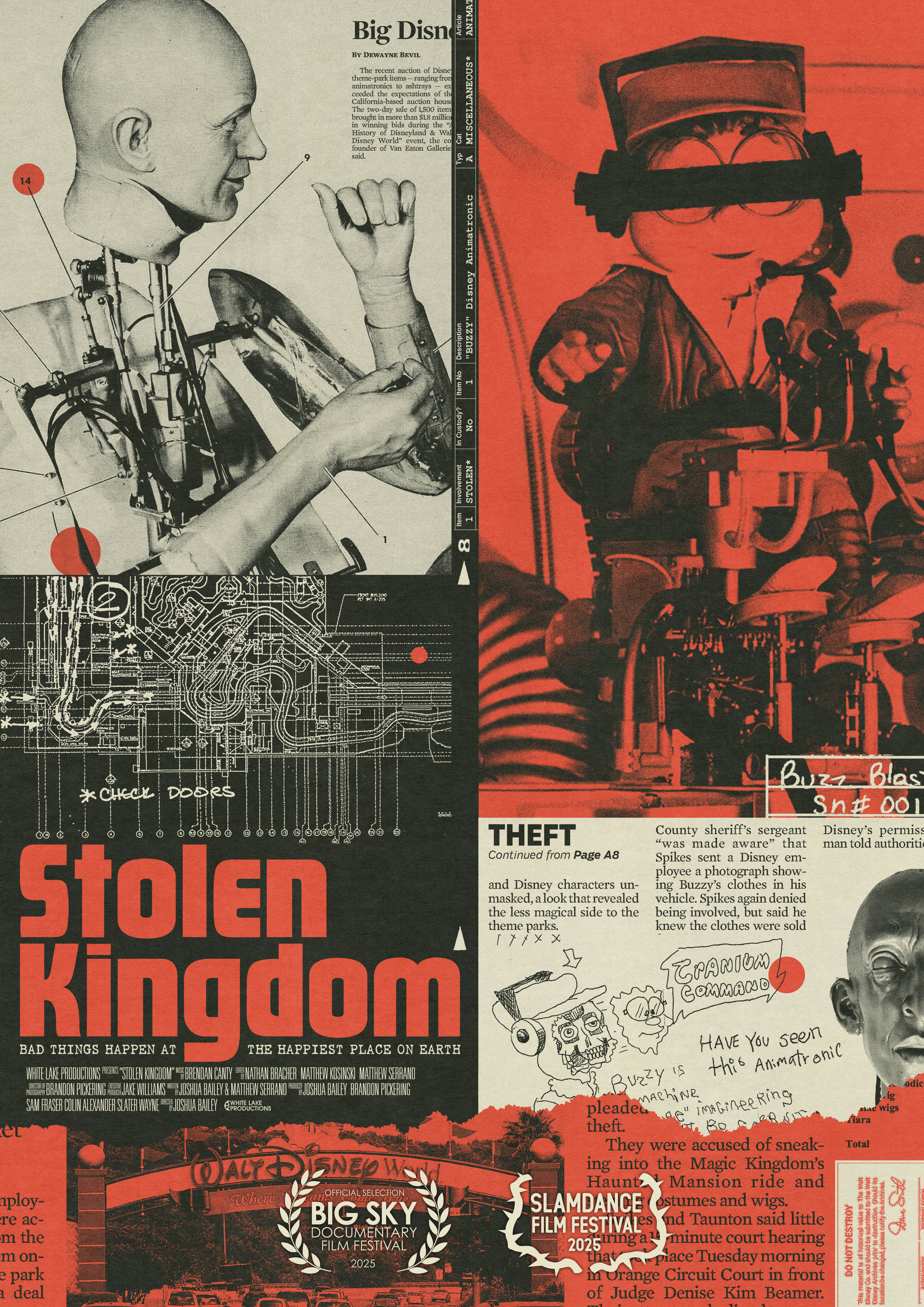
- Festival Promotional Poster
- Directed by: Joshua Bailey
- Produced by: Joshua Bailey; Slater Wayne; Brandon Pickering; Colin Alexander; Sam Fraser; Jake Williams; Joshua Koopman; Sammie Astaneh
- Cinematography: Brandon Pickering
- Edited by: Nathan Bracher; Matthew Kosinski; Willi Patton; Matthew Serrano
- Music by: Brendan Canty
- Production companies: Bright Sun Films; White Lake Productions
- Distributed by: Antenna Releasing
- Release dates: February 16, 2025 (Big Sky Documentary Film Festival); May 21, 2026 (United States)
- Running time: 74 minutes
- Country: United States
- Language: English

Stolen Kingdom is a 2025 American documentary film directed by Joshua Bailey. It covers notable figures in the urban exploring community at Walt Disney World and the disappearance of the Buzzy Audio-Animatronics figure from the Cranium Command attraction at the Wonders of Life pavilion at Walt Disney World Resort's Epcot theme park in 2018.

== Synopsis ==
Stolen Kingdom covers the reported theft of the Buzzy Audio-Animatronics figure from the Cranium Command attraction at the Wonders of Life pavilion at Walt Disney World Resort's Epcot theme park. It begins with other urban exploration at Walt Disney World, notably two explorers who documented the closing of the Horizons attraction who went by the pseudonyms "Hoot" and "Chief". Other famous abandoned locations covered include Disney's River Country and Discovery Island (Bay Lake). The film features interviews with prominent figures in the Disney urban exploration community, including Patrick Spikes.

== Release ==
Stolen Kingdom premiered at February 16, 2025, at the Big Sky Documentary Film Festival. It also played at the 2025 Slamdance Film Festival and as the opening night film at both the 2025 Florida Film Festival and Sidewalk Film Festival.

On May 21, 2026, an updated version of the film with information about Adam the Woo's December 2025 death was released theatrically in the United States. The updated version of the film ends with a brief clip of Adam at a younger age exploring Disney World followed by the dedication "In Memory of David Adam Williams".

== Production ==
Stolen Kingdom is the directorial debut of Joshua Bailey and was produced by Bailey, Brandon Pickering, and Sam Fraser. Jake Williams' production company Bright Sun Films co-produced the film. Cinematography was by Brandon Pickering. The film was shot throughout 2021, with Patrick Spikes being the first interview.

Brendan Canty, drummer of Fugazi, composed original score for the film.

== Reception ==
On the review aggregator website Rotten Tomatoes, 97% of 29 critics' reviews are positive.

Simon Thompson of Forbes said of the film: "skillfully made with a well-crafted narrative, this answers questions you were afraid to ask and takes you places you probably dreamt of going - but didn't want to suffer the consequences." Jim Vorel of Paste said, "Frankly, it's impressive just how much law-breaking the filmmakers of Stolen Kingdom manage to get these various figures to confess on camera in the course of its tidy runtime"
