= Patrick Spikes =

American former Disney employee and burglar

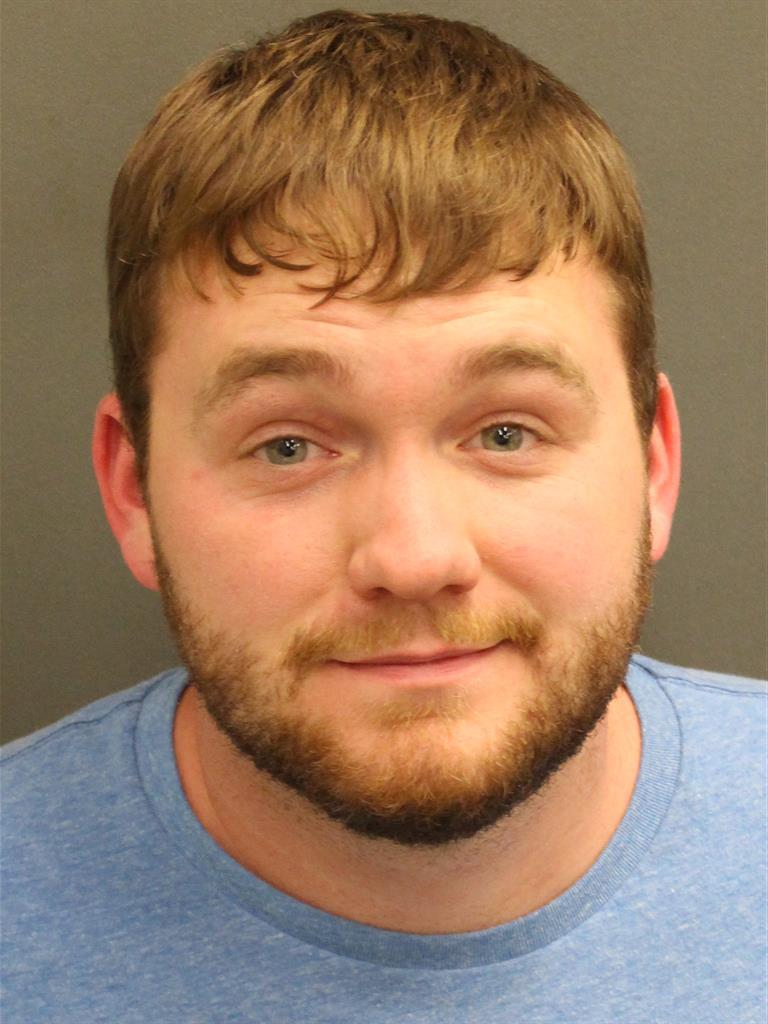
- Spikes' 2019 mugshot
- Born: Patrick Allen Spikes; August 30, 1994 (age 32)
- Education: Entertainment
- Alma mater: Full Sail University
- Employer: Walt Disney World (formerly)
- Criminal charges: Burglary; Fencing; Grand theft
- Criminal penalty: 10 years probation

YouTube information
- Channel: BackDoorDisney
- Years active: 2018–2019
- Subscribers: 13.3 thousand
- Views: 435 thousand
- Last updated: April 2026

Patrick Allen Spikes (born August 30, 1994) is an American former Walt Disney World employee. Spikes received media attention after he was arrested for stealing over $14,000 worth in Disney World cast member costumes and props.

== Background ==
Spikes is a native of Florida. He studied entertainment at Full Sail University. Spikes ran social media accounts on Instagram, Twitter, and YouTube under the name "BackDoorDisney," where he posted behind the scenes photos and videos backstage during his employment at Walt Disney World. At the time of his arrest, he resided in Winter Garden, Florida. A feature length documentary titled Stolen Kingdom was released in May of 2026, the film includes the story of Patrick's arrest, as well as interviews with Spikes himself.

== Theft and arrest ==
On July 31, 2018, Spikes, along with his cousin Blaytin Taunton, snuck into backstage areas at the Magic Kingdom theme park using the employee only utilidor system. While Spikes was a park employee at the time, Taunton was not. This prompted Spikes to create a fake ID for Taunton under the name "Jack D. Marrow" so he could access the utilidor system. They later entered a restricted area of the Haunted Mansion attraction and stole over $7,000 in props and clothing.

In December 2018, Spikes was brought into the Orange County Sheriff's Office for questioning regarding a stolen animatronic. Four months prior, Disney reported that an animatronic named "Buzzy" was stolen from the Cranium Command attraction at Epcot. Authorities received information that Spikes had texted photos of Buzzy's clothing to another Disney employee and intended to obtain a search warrant for Spikes' cell phone. After Spikes was told that he would have to leave his phone with the sheriff's office so they can investigate, he grabbed his phone and attempted to leave the interview room. Video from the interview shows Spikes being wrestled to the ground by police. He was charged with resisting an officer without violence. The charges were later dismissed.

On May 17, 2019, Spikes was arrested by Orange County Sheriff's Office after investigators connected Spikes to the Haunted Mansion costumes he had stolen almost a year prior. He faced burglary, fencing, and grand theft charges. Spikes' court case revealed that he had sold stolen memorabilia online, receiving over $30,000 from two customers via PayPal. One of his customers included NBA player Robin Lopez. Lopez, an avid Disney fan, unknowingly bought over $10,000 in stolen memorabilia from Spikes, including clothing from the missing "Buzzy" animatronic.

On February 4, 2020, Spikes and Taunton accepted plea deals, avoiding jail time. Both men were ordered to pay $25,308 in restitution; $6,703 to Disney, $10,700 to Robin Lopez, and $7,905 to an accountant from Winter Park. Spikes received 10 years probation and 250 hours of community service while Taunton received five years probation and 125 hours of community service. Both men were also ordered not to return to Disney property.

== See also ==
- List of incidents at Walt Disney World
