= Winnie Palmer Hospital for Women & Babies =

Coordinates: 28.526224°N 81.378262°W

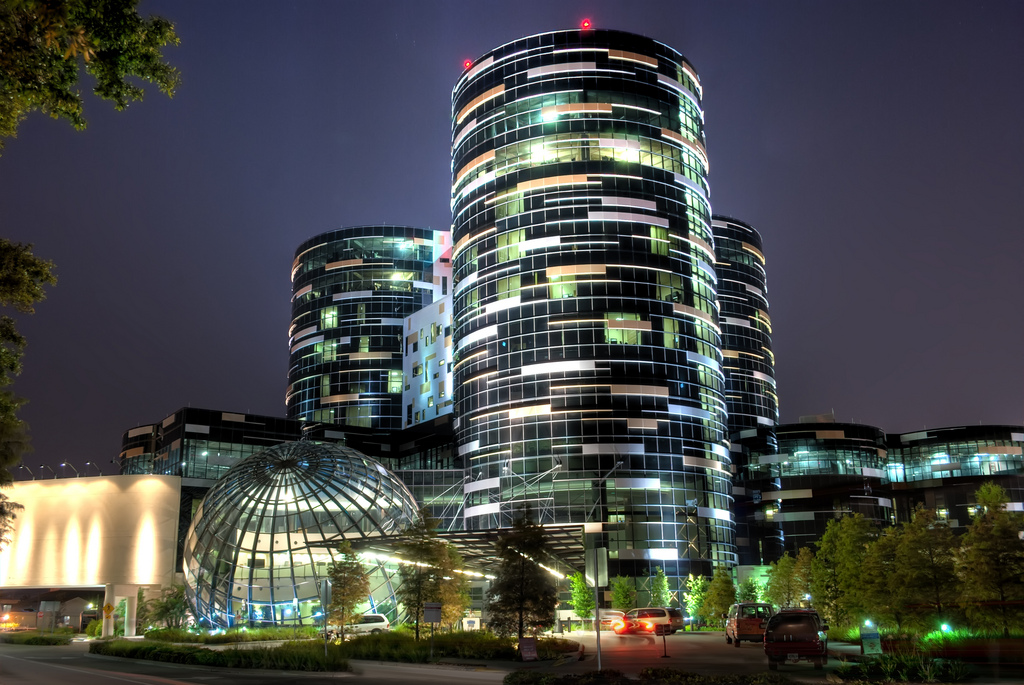
- Winnie Palmer Hospital for Women & Babies

Geography
- Location: Orlando, Florida, United States

Organization
- Care system: Private, not-for-profit
- Type: Hospital for women and babies

Services
- Beds: 285

History
- Opened: 2006

Links
- Website: Official website
- Lists: Hospitals in Florida

Winnie Palmer Hospital for Women & Babies (WPHfWB) is a nationally ranked, 285-bed non-profit, women and babies hospital located in Orlando, Florida. WPHfWB is a part of the Orlando Health system. As the hospital is a teaching hospital, it is affiliated with the Florida State University College of Medicine's Orlando campus. Additionally, Winnie Palmer Hospital for Women & Babies has a two-story skybridge to connect the hospital to the nearby Arnold Palmer Hospital for Children, which it keeps close affiliations to. The hospital contains one of two pediatric training programs in Orlando Health for medical students.

The hospital contains all of Orlando Health's gynecological facilities as well as the maternity department, and all neonatal/neonatal intensive care unit services.

== History ==
Before the dedication of a hospital specifically meant for women and babies, Orlando Health's labor and delivery services, as well as neonatal services, were all housed at the Arnold Palmer Hospital for Women and Children. The program was based here for many years, filling to capacity with no room for expansion of the current facility.

Due to capacity concerns, Orlando Health decided to build a new hospital adjacent to Arnold Palmer Hospital to provide care exclusively for women and babies. Ground was broken in 2004 on WPHfWB. The new hospital consisted of 400,000 square feet at a cost of $111 million.

On May 30, 2006, Winnie Palmer Hospital for Women & Babies officially opened, used exclusively to the needs of women and babies, creating one of the largest consolidated women's and children's campuses in the country.

The new hospital project allowed Arnold Palmer Hospital for Children (APHfC) to take over the facilities previously used for labor and delivery services to expand. APHfC was then renovated and nearly doubled its capacity for pediatrics.

Winnie Palmer and Arnold Palmer hospitals are now joined by a two-story sky bridge that allows the physicians and services to be shared among the babies and children at the two hospitals.

== See also ==
- Arnold Palmer Hospital for Children
- Florida State University College of Medicine
- List of children's hospitals in the United States
