= Orlando Health =

Hospital network in the United States

Coordinates: 28.52530°N 81.37835°W

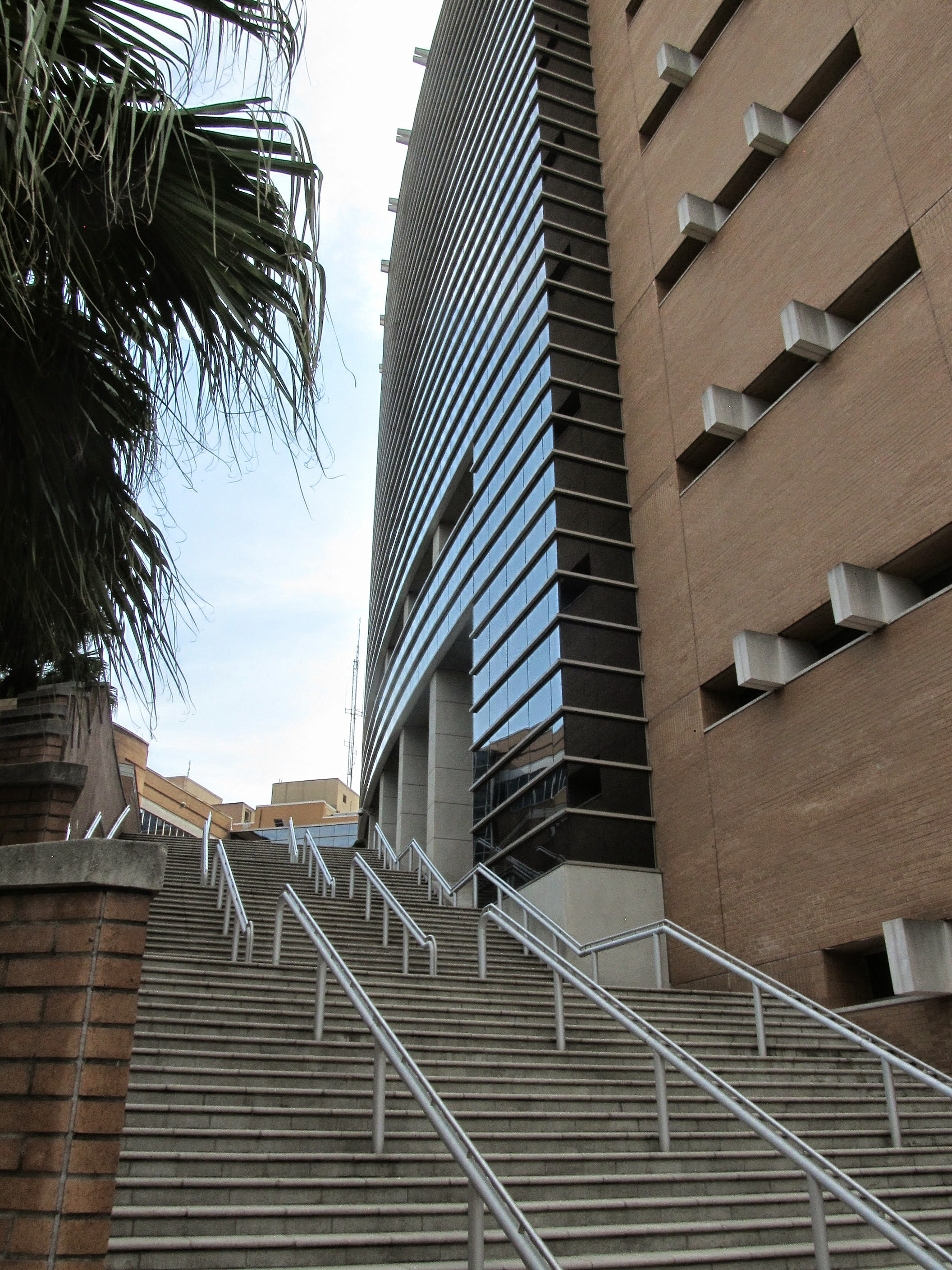
- Orlando Health's flagship hospital
- Formerly: Orlando Regional Healthcare System
- Type: Private Nonprofit
- Industry: Health care
- Founded: November 1918; 107 years ago
- Headquarters: 1414 Kuhl Avenue, Orlando, FL 32806
- Number of locations: 25 hospitals, 11 free standing ERs, 17 urgent care centers (2025)
- Area served: Florida, Alabama, Puerto Rico
- Key people: David Strong (President/CEO): 2015-present
- Revenue: ▲US$7.2 billion (2024); US$6.1 billion (2023)
- Total assets: 6,407,016,860 United States dollar (2022)
- Number of employees: 38,350
- Website: http://www.orlandohealth.com

Orlando Health is a private, not-for-profit network of community and specialty hospitals in Florida, Alabama, and Puerto Rico. Based in Orlando, Florida, Orlando Health is Central Florida’s fourth-largest employer with nearly 29,000 employees and more than 4,500 affiliated physicians. It is the second-largest health system in Florida. Its flagship hospital, Orlando Regional Medical Center, is home to Central Florida’s only Level I trauma center.

== History ==
Local leaders and physicians began meeting with the hospital commission of the Orlando Board of Trade in 1916 to plan a new hospital. Fundraising for the first full-service hospital in the county was organized by some of Orlando’s most prominent physicians, including Dr. C. D. Christ, Dr. John McEwan, Dr. Gaston Edwards, and Dr. J.B. Callahan, the only African-American doctor in Orlando. James LeRoy Giles, mayor of Orlando from 1916 to 1920, gave $1,000 to the building committee and led the hospital association. Orlando Health began serving its first patients when Orange General Hospital opened its doors in November 1918. When constructed, the four-story hospital included a ward for Black residents, separate wards for men and women on the first floor, and private rooms on the second floor. By 1923, the hospital had 102 beds and also featured a training school for nurses.

On Memorial Day 1946, Orange General Hospital was renamed to Orange Memorial Hospital to honor the soldiers who died in World War II, along with the institution’s founders. In 1951, Orange Memorial became one of Florida’s earliest teaching hospitals, welcoming medical students specializing in urology, obstetrics and gynecology, and surgery.

The other predecessor to Orlando Health, Holiday Hospital, opened in 1950 with 17 beds. The name was borrowed from Holiday House, a smaller facility that had specialized in caring for children with rheumatic heart disease since 1939. By 1971, Holiday Hospital grew to 265 beds and became known for specialties in glaucoma detection and speech and hearing impediments. Orlando Health Arnold Palmer Hospital for Children is now located where Holiday Hospital once stood.

In 1977, Orange Memorial and Holiday consolidated to form the new Orlando Regional Medical Center. The Orange Memorial Hospital building was demolished in 1994.

In 1984, the Air Care Team was formed, providing scene and interfacility air transport to the Central Florida area.

In 1985, ORMC opened Sand Lake Hospital, now known as Orlando Health Dr. P. Phillips Hospital. This was the first Orlando Health hospital built outside of its downtown Orlando campus.

In 1989, ORMC opened the Arnold Palmer Hospital for Children and Women.

In 1991, the original Orange Memorial Hospital buildings were torn down. In its place ORMC embarked on a $66 million expansion of its downtown Orlando campus.

In 1992, ORMC changed its corporate name to Orlando Regional Healthcare System to reflect the growing network of facilities. That same year, ORHS began co-owning South Seminole Hospital with Healthtrust. In 1997, ORHS purchased a 49% share in Leesburg Regional Medical Center.

In 2006, ORHC opened Winnie Palmer Hospital for Women and Babies. When Winnie Palmer opened, Arnold Palmer Hospital for Children & Women, which was designed to handle 6,500 deliveries annually, had more than 12,000 births the previous year, making it the third busiest hospital for births in the U.S.

In October 2007, ORHC and University of Central Florida College of Medicine signed a partnership, to have medical students continue their education with the hospital network. In November 2019, the partnership came to an end when the medical school agreed to become a part owner of a teaching hospital with HCA Healthcare.

In 2008, the system was rebranded to change the corporate name of the organization from Orlando Regional Healthcare to Orlando Health.

In 2011, Orlando Health began a major $300 million expansion project at Orlando Regional Medical Center that included the construction of a new North Tower housing cardiac care, neurology, trauma ICU, and inpatient rehabilitation. The project also renovated the hospital’s South Tower.

In 2016, Orlando Health was thrust into the international spotlight following the mass shooting at the nearby PULSE nightclub as the closest trauma center. In less than 12 hours, surgeons at ORMC operated on 26 victims.

In 2020, the tiniest baby to ever survive at Orlando Health Winnie Palmer Hospital for Women and Babies went home after six months in the neonatal intensive care unit (NICU). Baby Diana — born at 22 weeks weighing only 12 ounces and going home weighing over 7 pounds — joined a group of only 10 babies in the world recorded to have survived at her size and gestational age.

In 2021, the Orlando Health Foundation received its largest-ever gift, a $5 million gift to expand the Level One Trauma Center at ORMC. The gift from the donor, who chose to remain anonymous, increased surge capacity, which was a need recognized following the Pulse nightclub tragedy in 2016.

In October 2022, Orlando Health partnered with Doctors’ Center Hospitals to operate a 105-bed hospital in Dorado, Puerto Rico. In July 2023, the partnership expanded to include hospitals in San Juan, Bayamón, Manatí and Carolina and an ambulatory diagnostic and treatment center in Arecibo.

In August 2023, Orlando Health Jewett Orthopedic Hospital opened in downtown Orlando. It is the first orthopedic hospital in Florida.

On August 5, 2024, crossing state lines, Orlando Health agreed to purchase the majority stake in Birmingham-based Brookwood Baptist Health held by Tenet Healthcare, thus expanding Orlando Health’s presence in Alabama. The proposed deal would retain Baptist Health System as a partner.

n January 2025, Orlando Health opened a new hospital in Lake Mary to replace Orlando Health South Seminole Hospital in Longwood.

In March 2025, Orlando Health announced a collaboration with Watson Clinic to open Orlando Health Watson Clinic Lakeland Highlands Hospital in June 2026. When it opens it will have 69 emergency and 18 intensive care beds, 11 operating rooms, four cardiac suites and a birthing center with eight labor and delivery rooms, with a 12-bed neonatal intensive care unit debuting shortly after opening.

As of June 2025, Orlando Health is developing the Florida Medical Clinic Orlando Health Wiregrass Ranch Hospital, which is expected to open in 2026 in Wesley Chapel.

=== Mergers and acquisitions ===
In March 1977, Orange Memorial and Holiday Hospital merged to form Orlando Regional Medical Center, creating efficiencies by eliminating duplicated services and equipment between the two hospitals.

In 1997, Orlando Regional Healthcare System acquired a 49 percent share in Leesburg Regional Medical Center.

In 1992, Orlando Health acquired South Seminole Hospital, its first hospital in Seminole County.

In 1995, South Lake Hospital became affiliated with Orlando Health. The hospital became fully integrated with OH in 2019.

In 1999, Orlando Regional Healthcare System purchased Lucerne Hospital to streamline care and relieve overcrowding at Orlando Regional Medical Center.

In 2011, Orlando Health purchased Health Central Hospital in Ocoee. The purchase also included Health Central Park, a 228-bed nursing facility.

In 2013, Orlando Health acquired Physician Associates, one of the largest multispecialty practices in Central Florida. Two years later, OHPA acquired Pediatric Associates of Orlando, one of the region’s first pediatric practices.

In 2020, Orlando Health acquired Jewett Orthopaedic Clinic, later known as Orlando Health Jewett Orthopedic Institute (OHJOI). Orlando Health also finalized its purchase of St. Cloud Regional Medical Center in 2020.

In 2022, the Colon and Rectal Clinic of Orlando joined Orlando Health to create the Orlando Health Colon and Rectal Institute after more than 40 years of partnership.

==== Tampa Bay region ====
In June 2020, Community Health Systems announced it would sell St. Petersburg's oldest and largest hospital, Bayfront Health St. Petersburg, to Orlando Health. On October 1, 2020, the sale by Community Health Systems and minority partner Foundation for a Healthy St. Petersburg finalized.

After the sale, Orlando Health made significant investments in the hospital to update and improve the facility and equipment. In May 2025, Bayfront received its first ever A grade for safety.

In 2023, Florida Medical Clinic, a physician group with more than 60 locations in Pinellas, Hillsborough, and Pasco Counties, joined Orlando Health. As of June 2025, Orlando Health is developing the Florida Medical Clinic Orlando Health Wiregrass Ranch Hospital, which is expected to open in 2026 in Wesley Chapel.

==== Birmingham, Alabama ====
Orlando Health completed its purchase of Tenet Healthcare’s majority stake in Brookwood Baptist Health in October 2024. The five-hospital system includes locations in Birmingham, Talladega, Alabaster, and Jasper.

==== Florida’s Space Coast ====
In October 2024, Orlando Health completed a $439 million purchase of three hospitals from Steward Health Care located in Melbourne, Rockledge, and Sebastian. In April 2025, Orlando Health closed the Rockledge hospital, which had fallen into significant disrepair under the previous owners. Orlando Health has committed to spending more than $750 million in Brevard County on the construction of a new hospital and other healthcare facilities by 2029.

== Facilities ==
As of December 2025, Orlando Health operates 25 hospitals, 12 free-standing emergency rooms, and 12 specialty institutes in Florida, Alabama and Puerto Rico.

=== Orlando metro area ===
There are four hospitals and five specialty institutes located on Orlando Health’s main campus in downtown Orlando: Orlando Regional Medical Center, Arnold Palmer Hospital for Children, Winnie Palmer Hospital for Women & Babies, and Orlando Health Jewett Orthopedic Institute.

Other Orlando Health hospitals in the Orlando area include:

- Orlando Health Behavioral Health Hospital in Longwood
- Orlando Health Dr. P. Phillips Hospital in Orlando
- Orlando Health - Health Central Hospital and Health Central Park, a Nursing Rehabilitation Center in Ocoee
- Orlando Health Horizon West Hospital in Winter Garden
- Orlando Health Lake Mary Hospital in Lake Mary
- Orlando Health South Lake Hospital in Clermont

Orlando Health's 12 specialty institutes are headquartered in downtown Orlando, with locations in Tampa Bay, central Florida, and along the Space Coast and Treasure Coast.

- Orlando Health Advanced Rehabilitation Institute
- Orlando Health Aesthetic and Reconstructive Surgery Institute
- Orlando Health Cancer Institute
- Orlando Health Children's Heart Institute
- Orlando Health Children's Neuroscience Institute
- Orlando Health Colon and Rectal Institute
- Orlando Health Digestive Health Institute
- Orlando Health Heart and Vascular Institute
- Orlando Health Jewett Orthopedic Institute
- Orlando Health Neuroscience Institute
- Orlando Health Weight Loss and Bariatric Surgery Institute
- Orlando Health Women's Institute

=== Tampa Bay area ===
In October 2020, Orlando Health acquired St. Petersburg’s oldest and largest hospital, Bayfront Health St. Petersburg. The Orlando Health Cancer Institute has a presence at Bayfront. Orlando Health's Jewett Orthopedic Institute and Digestive Health Institute have locations throughout Pinellas, Hillsborough, and Pasco counties. As of June 2025, Orlando Health is developing the Florida Medical Clinic Orlando Health Wiregrass Ranch Hospital, which is expected to open in 2026 in Wesley Chapel.

=== Puerto Rico ===
In October 2022, Orlando Health partnered with Doctors’ Center Hospitals to operate a 105-bed hospital in Dorado, Puerto Rico. In July 2023, the partnership expanded to include hospitals in San Juan, Bayamón, Manatí and Carolina and an ambulatory diagnostic and treatment center in Arecibo.

=== Space Coast and Treasure Coast ===
In October 2024, Orlando Health completed a $439 million purchase of three hospitals from Steward Health Care located in Melbourne, Rockledge, and Sebastian. In April 2025, Orlando Health closed the Rockledge hospital, which had fallen into significant disrepair under the previous owners. The two Orlando Health-owned hospitals on the east coast of Florida now operate as Orlando Health Melbourne Hospital and Orlando Health Sebastian River Hospital. Orlando Health Children's Heart Institute has locations in Titusville and Melbourne. Orlando Health Jewett Orthopedic Institute has locations in Melbourne, Palm Bay, Sebastian, and Vero Beach. Orlando Health Weight Loss and Bariatric Surgery Institute is located in Sebastian. In December 2025, Orlando Health purchased land in Viera to build a new hospital.

=== Birmingham, Alabama ===
Orlando Health completed its purchase of Tenet Healthcare’s majority stake in Brookwood Baptist Health in October 2024. The five-hospital system includes locations in Birmingham, Talladega, Alabaster, and Jasper.

=== Polk County ===
In March 2025, Orlando Health announced a collaboration with Watson Clinic to open Orlando Health Watson Clinic Lakeland Highlands Hospital in June 2026.

== Awards and recognitions ==
In 2025, U.S. News and World Report ranked Arnold Palmer Hospital for Children in the Top 50 for seven pediatric specialties: behavioral health, endocrinology, neonatology, nephrology, neurology and neurosurgery, orthopedics, and urology. Orlando Regional Medical Center is ranked in the Top 50 for cardiology and endocrinology.

Orlando Health is also highly ranked as a Central Florida employer. Orlando Health won a “Best Places To Work 2025” award from Glassdoor, which is based on anonymous employee feedback.

The American Heart Association recognized Orlando Regional Medical Center, Dr. P. Phillips Hospital, South Lake Hospital, Health Central Hospital, St. Cloud Hospital, and Lake Mary Hospital in 2025 for their commitment to ensuring stroke patients quickly receive proper treatment according to nationally recognized, research-based guidelines.

South Lake Hospital was named to the Becker’s Hospital Review 100 Great Community Hospitals list in 2025. It was one of only two hospitals in Florida designated by the American Diabetes Association and The Leapfrog Group as a leader in caring for people living with diabetes. Orlando Health South Lake Hospital has earned an “A” grade from The Leapfrog Group for fourteen consecutive years.

Following its acquisition in 2020, Orlando Health Bayfront Hospital earned its first “A” grade from The Leapfrog Group in 2025.

When Leapfrog grades were released in fall 2025, Orlando Health South Lake Hospital, Orlando Health Melbourne Hospital, Orlando Health Horizon West Hospital, and Orlando Health Bayfront Hospital all received an A grade.

Orlando Health Orlando Regional Medical Center, Orlando Health Dr. P. Phillips Hospital, Orlando Health – Health Central Hospital, Orlando Health Lake Mary Hospital, Orlando Health Sebastian River Hospital and Orlando Health St. Cloud Hospital earned B grades.

The five Birmingham-area hospitals acquired by Orlando Health in October 2024 each received a C. These grades are based on data submitted to the Leapfrog Group by the previous owner. Due to the lag in clinical outcomes data available to national hospital rating services such as The Leapfrog Group, safety grades and quality rankings for these hospitals will be impacted by the previous owner’s data until at least 2027.

== Graduate medical education ==
Orlando Health became a statutory teaching hospital in 1951. As of 2024, four Orlando Health hospitals are named statutory teaching hospitals in Florida: Orlando Health Orlando Regional Medical Center, Orlando Health Dr. P Phillips Hospital, Orlando Health South Seminole Hospital, and Orlando Health Arnold Palmer Hospital for Children.

Leapfrog’s 2024 Hospital Survey named Orlando Health – Health Central Hospital, Orlando Health South Lake Hospital, Orlando Regional Medical Center, and Winnie Palmer Hospital for Women and Babies as top teaching hospitals in Florida.

Orlando Health Bayfront Hospital offers residency programs in family medicine, pharmacy, obstetrics and gynecology, as well as a fellowship program in sports medicine.

== Community investments, partnerships, and sponsorships ==
=== Community Health Needs Assessment ===
The Affordable Care Act requires all non-profit hospitals to conduct a Community Health Needs Assessment (CHNA) every three years to maintain their tax-exempt status. In 2013, Orlando Health partnered with other local healthcare institutions to prepare the first joint CHNA. In 2015, Orlando Health became a founding member of the Central Florida Community Benefit Collaborative, a broader partnership of other local healthcare institutions covering Lake County, Seminole County, Orange County, and Osceola County to produce the CHNA.

=== Foundation for a Healthy St. Petersburg ===
In 2023, Orlando Health Bayfront Hospital partnered with Foundation for a Healthy St. Petersburg to jointly award $2.9 million in grants to nonprofits working to impact mental health and well-being for Black, Indigenous and People of Color and working in economic equity and justice over 2023. In 2024, the two organizations awarded an additional $1.9 million in grants to improve infrastructure, planning and sustainability for 35 nonprofits focused on community health, education, housing and equity-related work. In 2025, through two different grant programs, the partners awarded another $1 million to 4 local nonprofits and $200,000 to 20 local nonprofits.

=== Sports ===
Orlando Health is the original shirt sponsor and healthcare partner for Orlando’s professional soccer teams, Orlando City SC and Orlando Pride. Orlando Health is the official medical team for the Orlando Ballet. Orlando Health Bayfront Hospital is the official healthcare partner of the Tampa Bay Rays and the Tampa Bay Rowdies and its youth network. Orlando Health is also the official healthcare provider for the Arnold Palmer Invitational.

In 2021, the Fort De Soto Triathlon Series named Orlando Health Bayfront Hospital its official medical team.

As of 2023, Orlando Health is the official healthcare partner for Topgolf in Orlando, Lake Mary, and Tampa. Through the partnership, Topgolf players can access golf wellness services like movement analysis and individualized exercise plans.

In 2024, Orlando Health announced a multi-year, primary partnership with City Garage Motorsports, a professional auto racing team based in Lakeland, for the No. 85 Ford driven by Becca Monopoli. In October 2025, Orlando Health added Orlando Health Watson Clinic Lakeland Highlands Hospital as a sponsor.

In February 2025, Firestone Grand Prix St Petersburg announced it would extend its partnership with Orlando Health Bayfront Hospital. Bayfront will continue to serve as the race’s official healthcare partner through 2028, providing on-site care to participants and fans.

=== Brightline ===
In advance of its Orlando station opening in 2023, Brightline announced a multi-year partnership with Orlando Health to become the station’s naming partner as well as the company’s official health and wellness partner.

=== Special Olympics Florida ===
In 2019, Orlando Health was designated as the official Central Florida Medical Home for Special Olympics Florida and served as the official Medical Team for the 2022 Special Olympics USA Games, which took place in the Orlando area. In 2024, Orlando Health and Special Olympics Florida renewed their five-year sponsorship agreement. Orlando Health also agreed to provide complimentary physicals for Special Olympics Florida athletes and to host annual physical fairs and provide athletic trainers for select competitions.

In 2021, Orlando Health began partnering with Special Olympics of Florida, the Center for Independent Living, and the Down Syndrome Foundation of Florida to offer an internship and recruitment program for adults with developmental disabilities, called the We Build program. Each organization refers interns and provides them with coaches for support. We Build teaches Orlando Health staff how to work with people with developmental disabilities, and helps the interns with disabilities learn how to manage the workplace. As of December 2024, 25 interns graduated from the paid internship program, and 17 were employed by Orlando Health.

=== Schools and universities ===
Orlando Health became one of the University of Central Florida’s first Pegasus Partners in 2023, joining leading companies in the Central Florida area who are making significant contributions to one of the largest universities in the country. Orlando Health is the official medical provider for UCF athletics.

In 2019, Orlando Health reached a sponsorship agreement with Eastern Florida State College including the naming rights to the college’s soccer stadium. As part of the agreement Orlando Health is the official medical team for the college’s athletics.

In 2021, Orlando Health announced a new partnership with Full Sail University giving Orlando Health naming rights to the university’s esports arena, the largest of its kind in the United States. Orlando Health and Full Sail University collaborate on joint research projects focused on improving and understanding the performance factors for gamers. Orlando Health is also the official medical team for the university’s esports teams.

Orlando Health also offers a preferred education program allowing employees to pursue associate degrees, bachelor’s degrees or certificates at seven state colleges in Florida, with all costs paid for directly by Orlando Health.

=== Visit Orlando ===
In 2022, Visit Orlando announced a new partnership with Orlando Health naming the healthcare system as the official health and wellness partner of Orlando’s convention and visitors bureau.
