= Arnold Palmer Hospital for Children =

Coordinates: 28.5234°N 81.3793°W

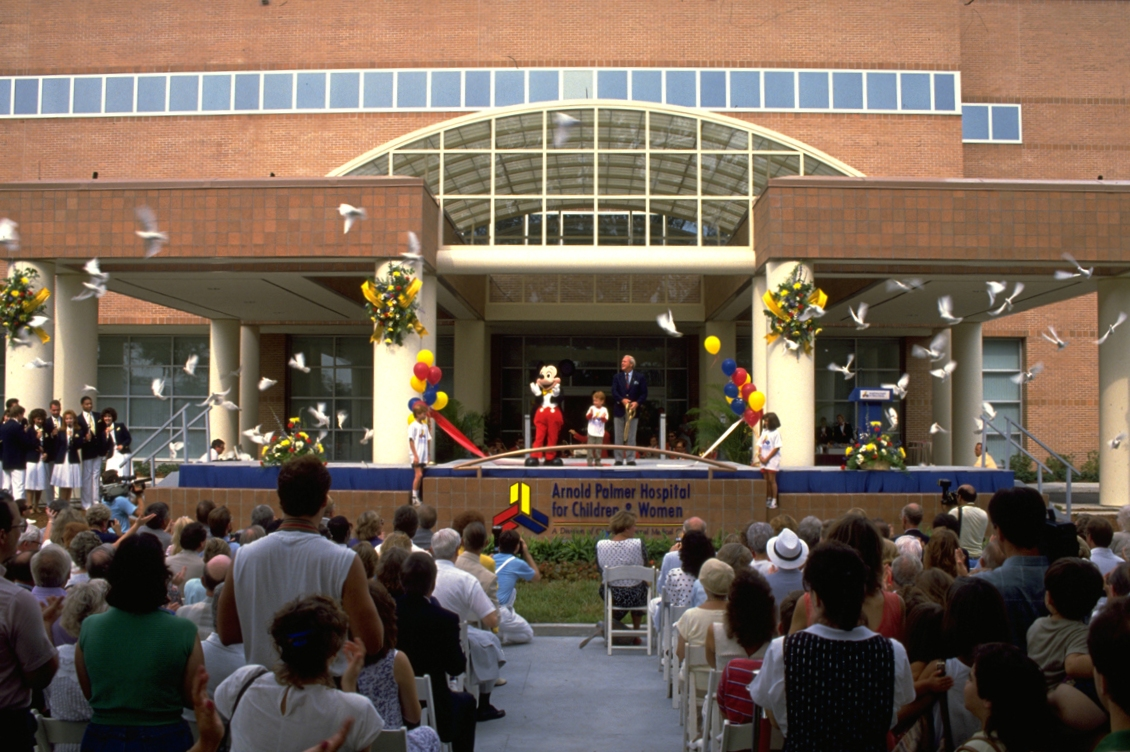
- Orlando Health Arnold Palmer Hospital for Children

Geography
- Location: 92 West Miller Street; Orlando, Florida; 32806

Organisation
- Care system: Private, Not-for-Profit
- Type: Pediatric Specialty Hospital

Services
- Emergency department: Level 1 Pediatric Trauma Center
- Beds: 158

History
- Opened: September 10, 1989; 36 years ago

Links
- Website: Official website

Orlando Health Arnold Palmer Hospital for Children is a 158-bed pediatric hospital in Orlando, Florida, United States. Arnold Palmer Hospital is part of Orlando Health, and is supported by the Arnold Palmer Medical Center Foundation. Together, the Arnold Palmer Hospital for Children and the Winnie Palmer Hospital for Women & Babies form the Arnold Palmer Medical Center. Arnold Palmer Hospital for Children is also home to the Howard Phillips Center for Children & Families.

The Bert Martin's Champions for Children Emergency Department & Trauma Center at Arnold Palmer Hospital is part of the only Level One Trauma Center in the area (Note: Orlando Regional Medical Center (ORMC) is a designated Level One Trauma Center and cares for pediatric and adult patients at Arnold Palmer Hospital and ORMC.)

As of the 2016-2017 rankings, Arnold Palmer Hospital is nationally ranked as a “Best Children’s Hospital” by U.S. News & World Report in five pediatric specialties - cardiology & heart surgery, diabetes & endocrinology, gastroenterology & GI surgery, orthopedics and urology.

Arnold Palmer Hospital for Children has affiliations with Camp Boggy Creek, Children's Miracle Network, the Florida Association of Children's Hospitals, Give Kids the World, the Make-A-Wish Foundation, the National Association of Children's Hospitals and Related Institutions, and the Ronald McDonald House.
