= Orlando Regional Medical Center =

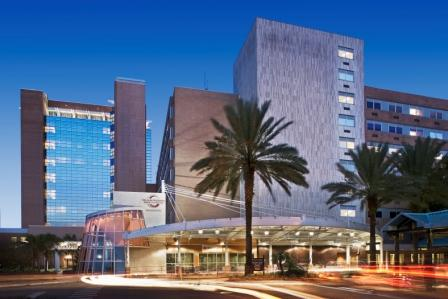

Geography
- Location: Orlando, Orange County, Florida, United States
- Coordinates: 28°31′33.77″N 81°22′41.45″W

Organization
- Care system: Private
- Type: General, Teaching
- Affiliated university: Florida State University College of Medicine; University of Central Florida College of Medicine; University of Florida College of Medicine; University of South Florida College of Medicine
- Network: Orlando Health

Services
- Emergency department: Level I trauma center
- Beds: 808

Helipads
- Helipad: FAA LID: FD28

History
- Founded: 1918

Links
- Website: www.orlandohealth.com/facilities/orlando-regional-medical-center
- Lists: Hospitals in Florida

Orlando Regional Medical Center (ORMC) is an 808-bed tertiary hospital in downtown Orlando, Florida designed by HKS, Inc. (architect) and Walter P Moore (structural engineer). It is the flagship of the Orlando Health system.

== Background ==
ORMC is also the closest Level I Trauma Center to Kennedy Space Center and is the definitive medical care facility (DMCF) for the launch site, with joint-training exercises held several times each year.

The hospital is nationally ranked in the U.S. News & World Report Best Hospitals Rankings for five pediatric specialties and rated high performing in nine adult procedures and conditions.

== History ==
Lucky Meisenheimer has served as ORMC's assistant clinical director since 1988 and the chief of its Dermatology division since 2003.

Many victims of the 2016 Pulse nightclub shooting were treated at ORMC. Nine of ORMC's patients died there, and by June 14, 27 remained hospitalized, with six in critical condition. ORMC performed surgeries on 76 patients. The last of the injured was discharged from ORMC on September 6, nearly three months after the shooting.

Other notable patients of ORMC include:

- On March 8, 1981, Alex Alexander and James Melson (a store owner and customer, respectively) were shot by Jerry White (criminal) during a robbery and they were both treated at ORMC. The former survived (but died years later from complications) but the latter died. White would later be convicted of the crime and executed in 1995.
- William Everett Potter died from heart failure at ORMC on December 5, 1988.
- Mike Cuellar died from stomach cancer at ORMC on April 2, 2010.
- James V. Martin stabbed and shot his wife, Christy Martin (boxer), after an argument in their home on November 23, 2010. He stabbed himself and was arrested a week later and was treated at ORMC. He survived and was found guilty of the crime and sentenced to 25 years.
- Christina Grimmie was treated and later died at ORMC on June 10, 2016 after being shot three times by an obsessive fan who killed himself shortly afterward. (Note: "Christina suffered a gunshot wound to the side of her head. ... This wound was fatal. Christina also suffered three gunshot wounds to her torso.")
- Markeith Loyd shot and killed his pregnant ex-girlfriend and also shot her brother Ronald Steward non-fatally on December 13, 2016. Just short of four weeks later, he shot and killed Police Lt. Debra Clayton on January 9, 2017. Both Steward and Clayton were treated at ORMC. Norman Lewis (Deputy First Class who was part of the manhunt for Loyd) was also treated and died at ORMC after a motorcycle crash the same day Clayton was murdered. Loyd would ultimately be captured and eventually sentenced to death, a sentence that hasn't been carried out yet.

== Sources ==
- Orlando Police Department (June 22, 2016). "Grimmie Investigative Supplement" (PDF) – via CNN.
