= Rediffusion (disambiguation) =

Rediffusion was a British company that distributed radio and television signals through wired relay networks.

Rediffusion may also refer to:

- Rediffusion London, a UK TV broadcaster formerly known as Associated-Rediffusion.
- Rediffusion Television, a Hong Kong broadcaster
- Rediffusion Simulation, a manufacturer of flight simulators
- Rediffusion S.A., a Swiss cable radio and TV broadcaster merged into UPC Switzerland in 1994
