= Star Tours – The Adventures Continue =

Attraction at Disney theme parks

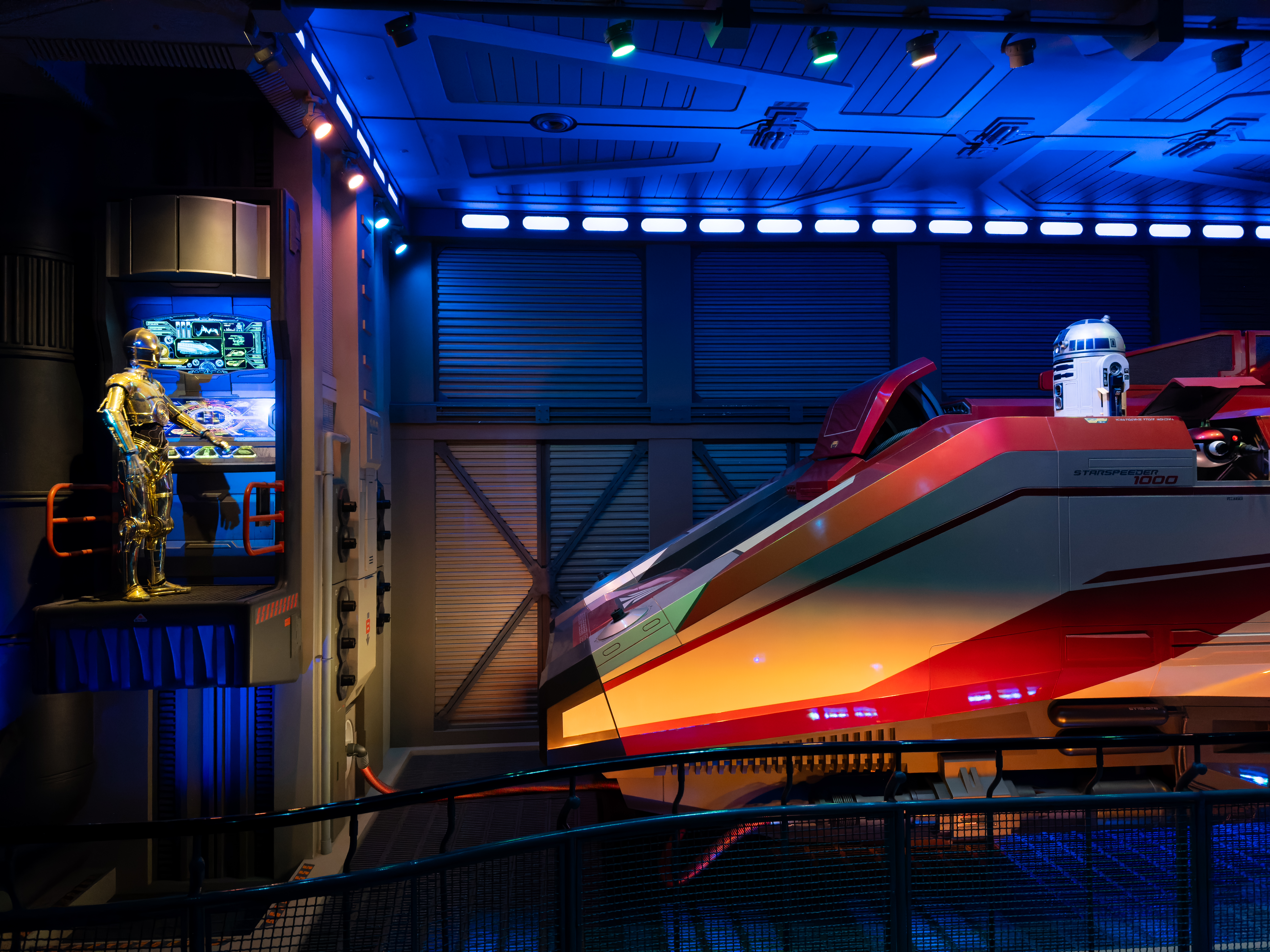
- C-3PO and R2-D2 in the attraction queue at Tokyo Disneyland

Disney's Hollywood Studios
- Area: Echo Lake
- Coordinates: 28.3552°N 81.5587°W
- Status: Operating
- Opening date: May 20, 2011; 15 years ago
- Replaced: Star Tours
- Lightning Lane available

Disneyland
- Area: Tomorrowland
- Coordinates: 33.8118°N 117.9177°W
- Status: Operating
- Opening date: June 3, 2011; 15 years ago
- Replaced: Star Tours
- Lightning Lane available

Tokyo Disneyland
- Area: Tomorrowland
- Coordinates: 35.6334°N 139.8783°E
- Status: Operating
- Opening date: May 7, 2013; 13 years ago
- Replaced: Star Tours

Disneyland Park (Paris)
- Area: Discoveryland
- Coordinates: 48.8751°N 2.7794°E
- Status: Operating
- Opening date: March 26, 2017; 9 years ago
- Replaced: Star Tours
- Disney Premier Access available

Ride statistics
- Attraction type: 3-D Motion simulator
- Manufacturer: Thales Training & Simulation
- Designer: Walt Disney Imagineering
- Theme: Star Wars
- Music: John Williams (Ride score); Michael Giacchino (Pre-show and queue)
- Vehicle type: StarSpeeder 1000 Motion simulator
- Riders per vehicle: 40
- Rows: 5
- Duration: 4:30 minutes
- Height restriction: 40 in (102 cm)
- Sponsors: SMS Audio (2015–present); JCB (Tokyo Disneyland)
- Ride host: C-3PO (Anthony Daniels)
- Single rider line available
- Must transfer from wheelchair
- Assistive listening available

Star Tours – The Adventures Continue is an attraction located at Disney's Hollywood Studios, Disneyland, Tokyo Disneyland, and Disneyland Paris. Set in the Star Wars universe, Star Tours – The Adventures Continue takes passengers on a turbulent trip across the galaxy, as droids C-3PO and R2-D2 attempt to safely return a spy to the Rebel Alliance.

Despite conflicting timelines, The Adventures Continue features locations and characters from all nine films of the Skywalker saga, unlike its predecessor Star Tours, which mostly took place after the events of the original trilogy (Episode IV – A New Hope through Episode VI – Return of the Jedi). The attraction opened on May 20, 2011, at Disney's Hollywood Studios, on June 3, 2011, at Disneyland, on May 7, 2013, at Tokyo Disneyland, and on March 26, 2017, at Disneyland Paris.

== Development ==
=== Pre-production ===
In 1998, Disney began planning to upgrade Star Tours as part of the release of the upcoming 1999 film Star Wars: Episode I – The Phantom Menace, the first film of the new prequel trilogy. There would be new flights, with passengers going to the Boonta Eve Classic Podrace on Tatooine. Captain Rex would still be a part of the new version and the droids in the queue line would be working on engines and podrace components. This version would be in 3D, with glasses resembling Anakin Skywalker's goggles. However, changing the story to focus on Episode I would make the attraction outdated, as two new upcoming films would feature new characters and locations. Officials chose to wait until 2003 when production began on Revenge of the Sith before remodeling Star Tours.

In April 2005, at Star Wars Celebration III at the Indiana Convention Center in Indianapolis, creator George Lucas confirmed that a Star Tours II was in production. In May 2009, /Film reported that filming for the new version of Star Tours was underway in West Hollywood, California.

During pre-production, one of the locations that Imagineers wanted guests to visit was the ice planet of Hoth while it was under siege by Imperial walkers. However, the idea was quickly scrapped because it would interfere with the attraction's placement in the Star Wars timeline. According to Imagineer Jason Surrell, after the Hoth battle idea was replaced with an encounter with the planet's native fauna (e.g. tauntauns and wampas), the concept was presented to George Lucas. Lucas, although liking the idea, requested that the battle scene be used instead, even if it meant disrupting the series' canon. Lucas offered the possibility that there was perhaps an earlier scuffle between Rebel and Imperial forces on the planet before the events in Episode V – The Empire Strikes Back unfolded and that they "later decided to build a base there figuring the Empire wouldn't think the rebels would return to that same location." The Kashyyyk sequence was suggested by John Lasseter (then-Principal Creative Advisor for Walt Disney Imagineering). Industrial Light & Magic was responsible for the extensive computer-generated imagery seen throughout the attraction.

At the 2009 D23 Expo in Anaheim, Walt Disney Imagineering announced that Star Tours at Disneyland and Disney's Hollywood Studios would be closed in October 2010 for total renovation and would reopen in May and June 2011 as Star Tours – The Adventures Continue. The updated ride system would consist of high-definition video, a Dolby 3D high-definition screen, an improved motion simulator, as well as several other newly added special effects. A short teaser trailer was shown at the expo featuring a podracing scene similar to that from Episode I – The Phantom Menace. An accompanying teaser picture depicted a red-colored "StarSpeeder 1000" spacecraft.

=== Previews ===
In May 2010, Disney announced exact dates for the closure of Star Tours at both parks, both earlier than the originally announced October 2010 date. Star Tours closed on July 26 at Disneyland and on September 7 at Disney's Hollywood Studios.

On June 11, 2010, at the "What's Next?" presentation, Disney announced that the re-imagined attraction would take place between Revenge of the Sith and Star Wars – Episode IV: A New Hope and would be named Star Tours – The Adventures Continue. They also premiered an image showcasing the StarSpeeder 1000 flying through Coruscant.

On August 12, during Celebration V, Disney showed a preview 'commercial' of what guests may expect to see, including visits to Endor, Bespin, and Alderaan.

By September 24, two new characters were revealed for Star Tours – The Adventures Continue. The first one was Ace, the "new" pilot, and the second one was the Aly San San spokesdroid, voiced by Allison Janney. During D23's "Destination D" event, Disneyland Resort President George Kalogridis stated that the new ride would feature 54 possible different experiences.

On October 26, Tom Fitzgerald, Executive VP and Senior Creative Executive of Walt Disney Imagineering, stated that while Ace was supposed to be the pilot of the StarSpeeder 1000s, by the time riders actually take off, the true new pilot would be C-3PO. Fitzgerald also mentioned that Captain Rex, the former Star Tours pilot (but within the series' timeline, the future pilot), would also make an appearance somewhere on the new version of the attraction. Anthony Daniels, who played C-3PO in all the Star Wars films, returned to portray the character in three mediums; live-action suit, motion capture, and Audio-Animatronic voice.

Fitzgerald revealed on February 11, 2011, that more characters would be encountered on the ride, including Darth Vader, Boba Fett, Imperial Stormtroopers, "Jumptroopers", Admiral Ackbar, Yoda, Princess Leia, and Chewbacca. He confirmed on April 1, locations that guests could visit on the new attraction. Destinations include Tatooine, Coruscant, Hoth, Naboo, Kashyyyk, and the Death Star as it orbits Geonosis.

=== Official opening and subsequent changes ===
The attraction in Orlando began soft openings on May 14, with the official opening at midnight on May 20, 2011. The attraction in Anaheim began soft openings on May 20, with the official opening in the morning of June 3, 2011. Tokyo Disneyland's Star Tours attraction closed on April 2, 2012, and reopened as the revamped attraction on May 7, 2013. Disneyland Paris' Star Tours attraction was the final incarnation to change; it closed on March 16, 2016, and reopened as The Adventures Continue on March 26, 2017.

In 2012, Star Tours – The Adventures Continue was awarded as the most "Outstanding Attraction Refresh" by the Themed Entertainment Association.

At the 2015 D23 Expo, it was announced that a desert planet called Jakku from The Force Awakens would be added to the attraction. The new adventure became available beginning November 16, 2015. The mineral planet Crait from The Last Jedi and Batuu, the remote outpost forest and mountain planet from Star Wars: Galaxy's Edge, were added to the attraction on November 17, 2017. The ocean moon Kef Bir from The Rise of Skywalker was added to the ride on December 20, 2019, the film's release date along with Exegol, another planet from The Rise of Skywalker.

In January 2020, the Disneyland location received a single rider line due to heavy crowds.

In April 2023, Imagineer Scott Trowbridge announced at Star Wars Celebration Europe IV that more destinations would be added to the Disneyland, Walt Disney World, and Disneyland Paris iterations of the attraction, which occurred on April 5, 2024.

== Attraction ==
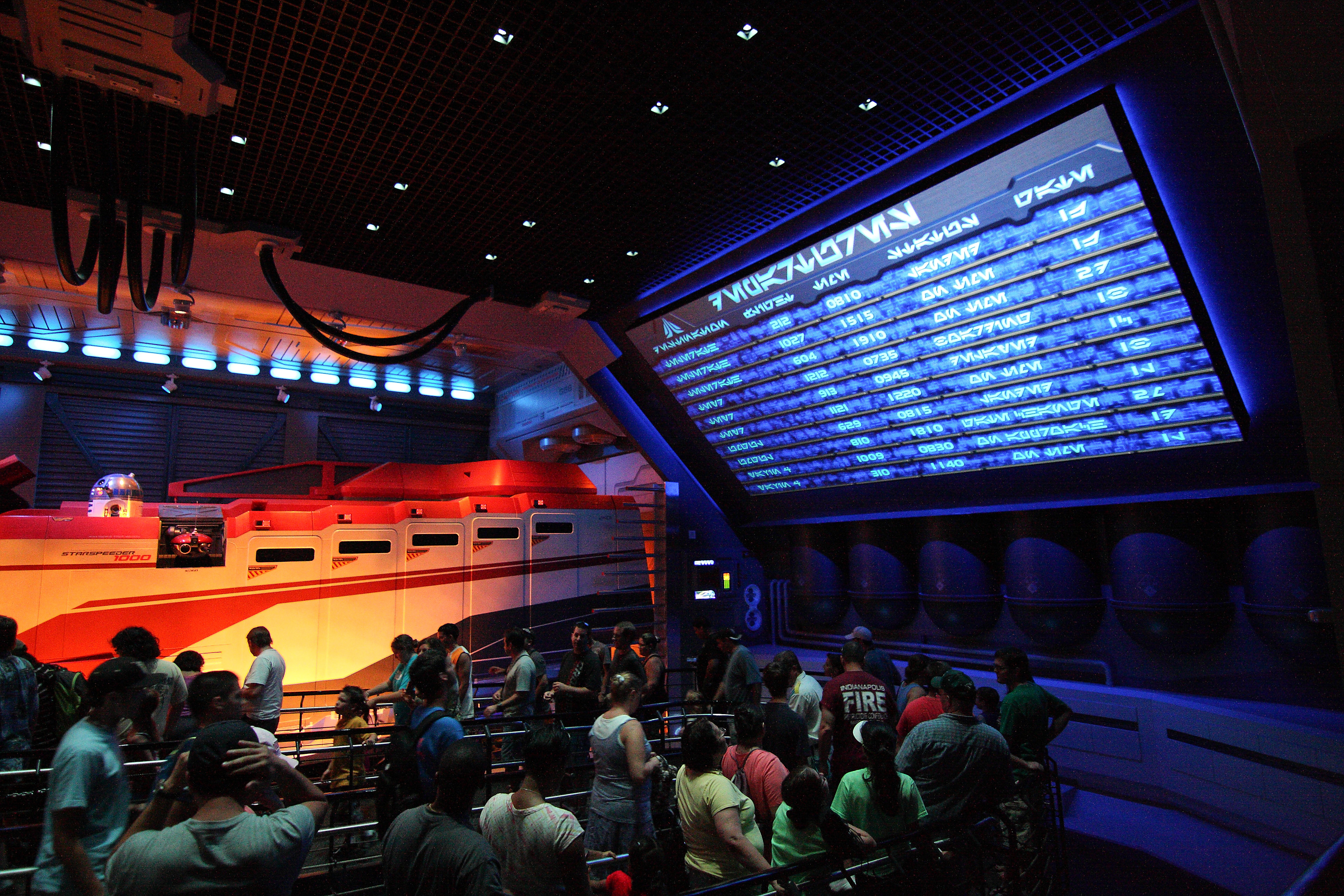
Indoor queue at Disney's Hollywood Studios

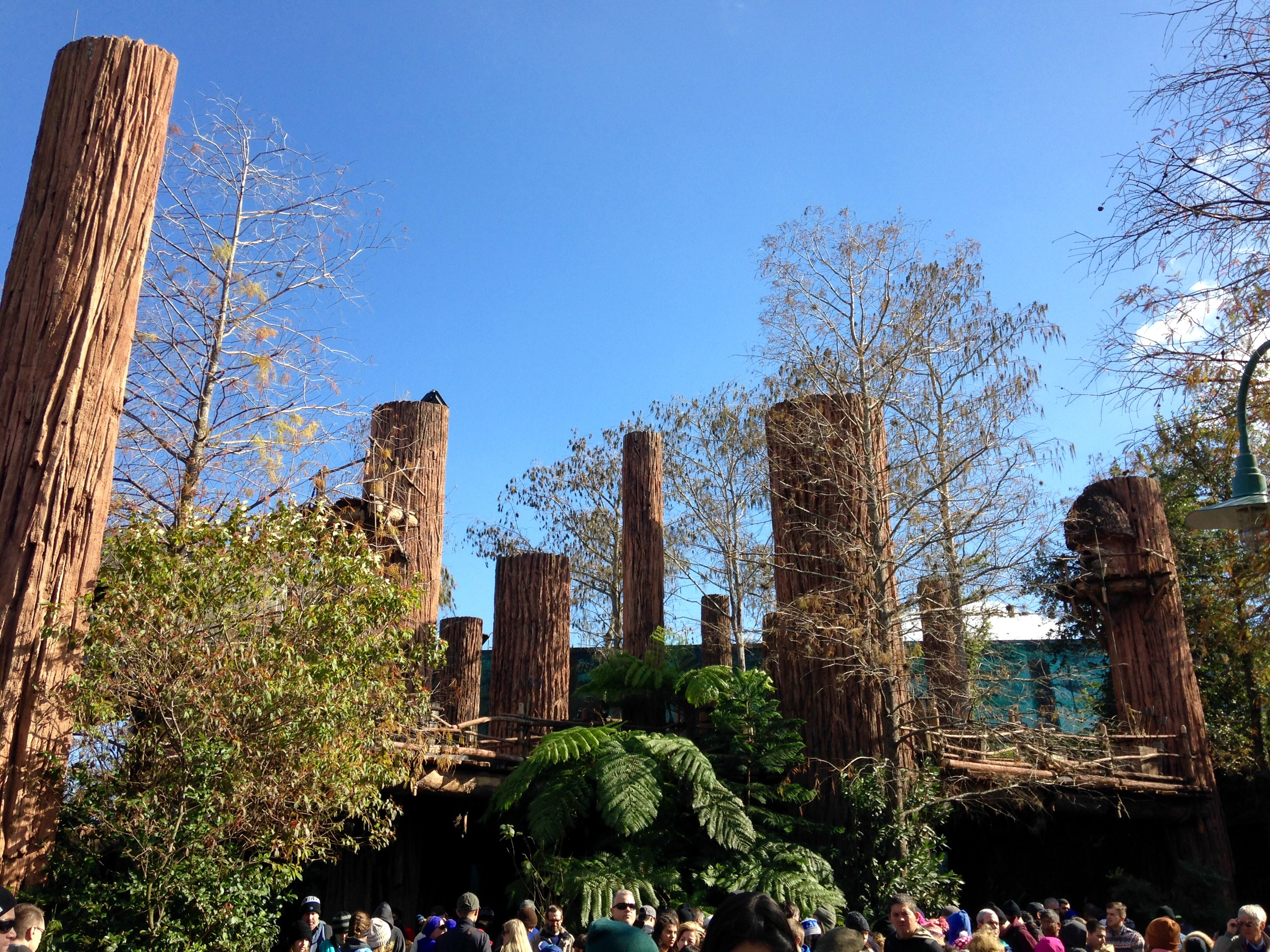
Exterior Endor forest village set in Disney's Hollywood Studios

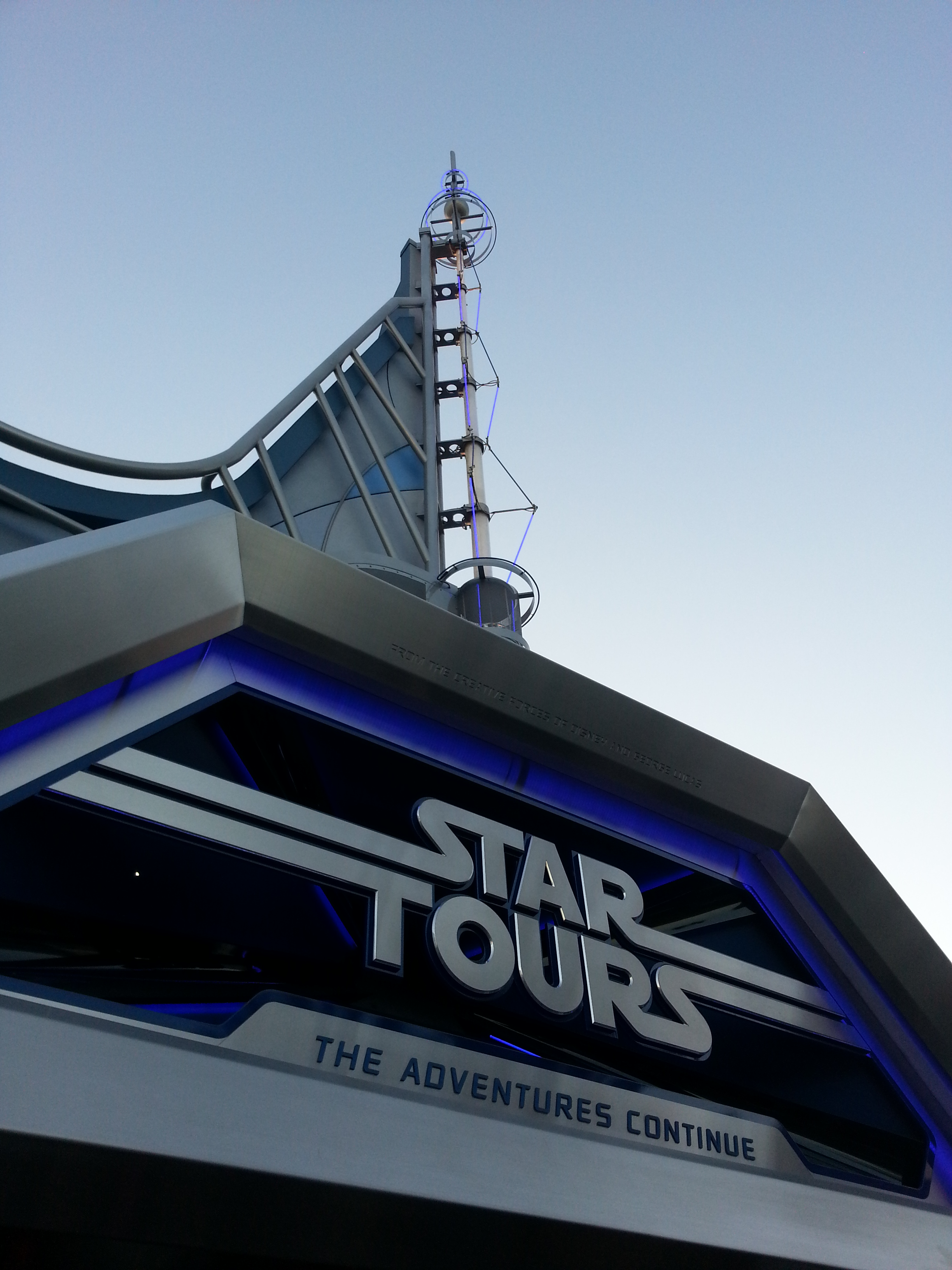
Attraction marquee at Disneyland

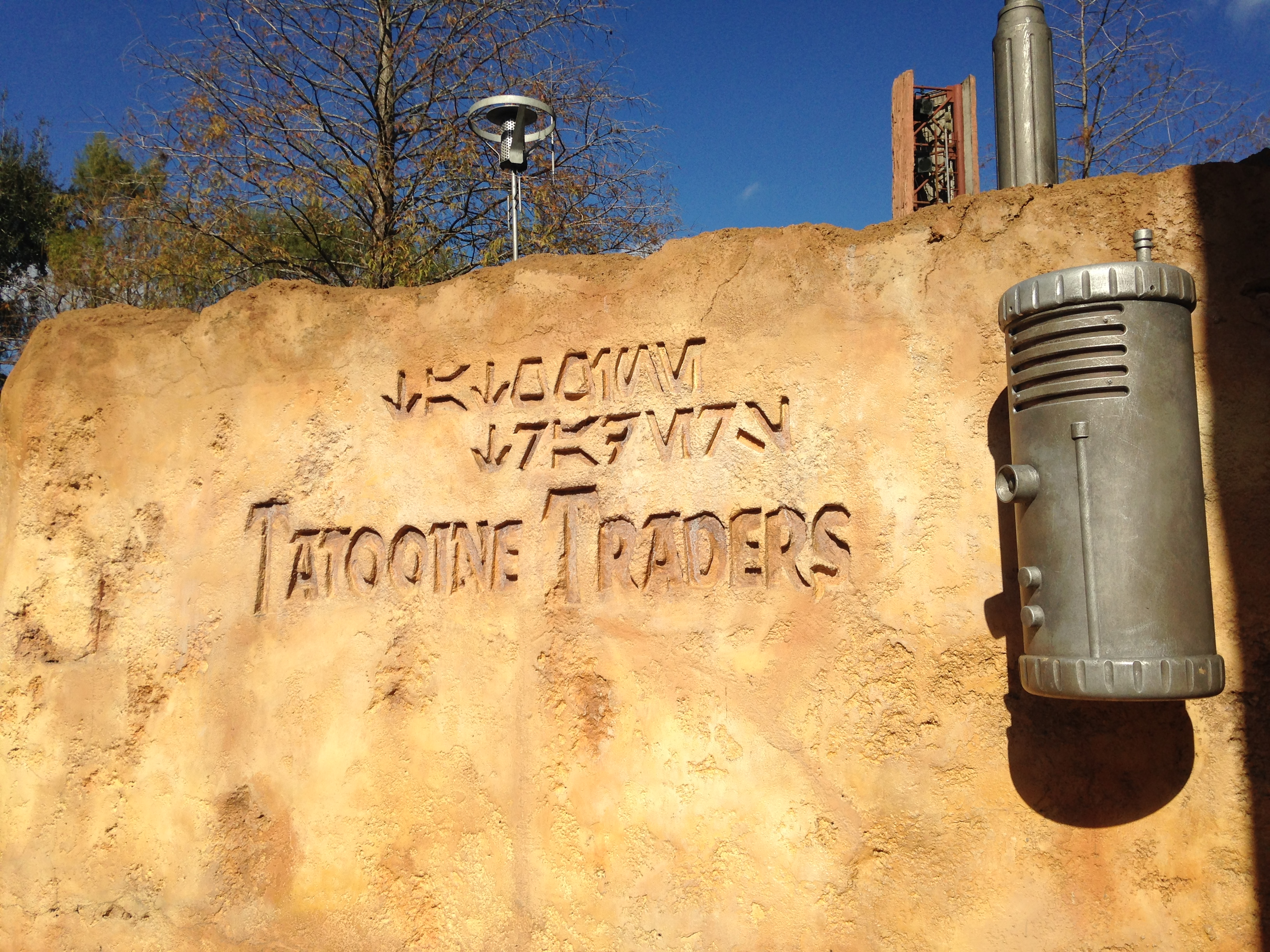
The Tatooine Traders gift shop in Disney's Hollywood Studios

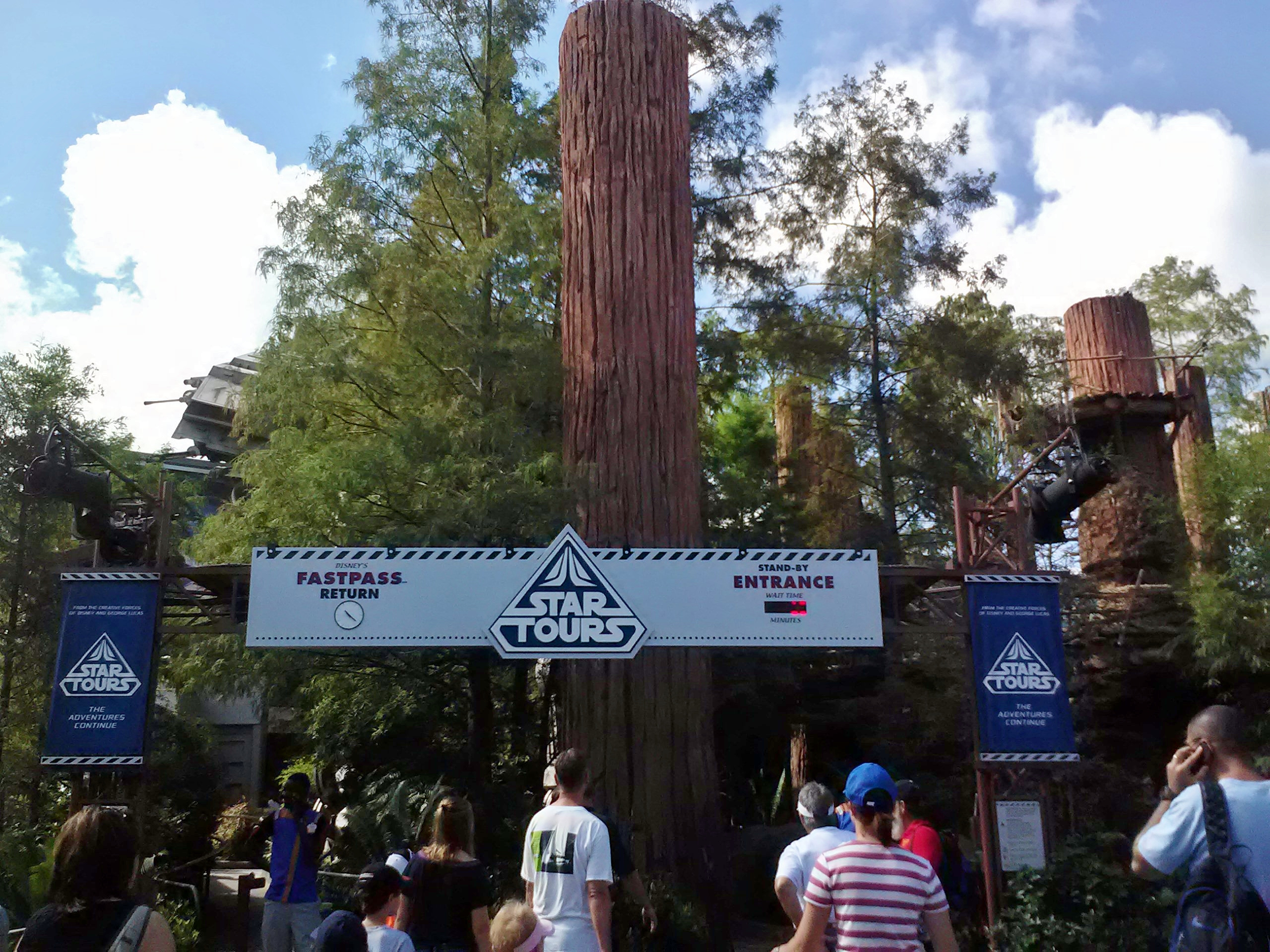
Attraction marquee at Disney's Hollywood Studios

The exteriors of all four Star Tours attractions are different in their respective parks. The attraction in Florida is inspired by an Ewok village on the forest moon of Endor, whereas the California, Japan, and France versions are modeled after a Tomorrowland-esque space port.

=== Backstory ===
According to the opening crawl that preceded the attraction's inaugural opening; after the Dark Times began, Captain Antilles had dispatched C-3PO and R2-D2, the series' protagonist droids who were placed in the custody of Antilles by order of Bail Organa near the end of Revenge of the Sith, to assist in the inauguration of the spaceline. The seemingly close relationship between the Rebel Alliance and the Star Tours agency, caused the Galactic Empire to believe that both entities were in a partnership, and thus has monitored the agency's actions over the years.

=== Queue ===
Similar to the functionality of the previous Star Tours attraction, The Adventures Continue places guests in the role of space tourists en route to a predetermined destination. The queue is designed to resemble a spaceport terminal: posters advertise voyages to different planets, and a large LCD screen informs riders of flight statuses, planetary weather forecasts, and advertisements promoting the benefits of booking flights with Star Tours. The screen displays information in spoken basic language and Aurebesh. The queue is populated with Audio-Animatronic characters, including C-3PO, R2-D2, and two Mon Calamari officers, that interact with one another and to guests. Entering the cargo bay, Captain Rex from the original attraction can be found, who in accordance with the timeline has not been used yet, and is therefore being sent back to a factory as defective. He occasionally has a power surge and delivers a line from the original attraction. Two G2 droids interact with guests as they conduct their tasks. The more outspoken droid processing the passengers' luggage on a scanning system reveals the luggages' contents to the guests waiting in the queue. Many references, gags, and in-jokes relating to Star Wars, Disney, and Pixar films are made via the contents of this luggage. Guests then retrieve their 3-D "flight glasses" and are directed by a flight agent to four gates in Disneyland and six gates in Disney's Hollywood Studios, Tokyo Disneyland and Disneyland Paris where they wait to board.

=== Pre-show ===
Television monitors show C-3PO getting hired by the ship's captain AC-38 or Ace to be assigned to maintenance to fix a binary motivator on the StarSpeeder 1000 that guests are about to board. However, as soon as C-3PO intentionally sits on the captain's chair to begin maintenance, he inadvertently gets trapped in the cockpit due to the ship's autopilot unexpectally engaging which detects him in the seat and silently assumes Ace has returned, and it seals the cockpit shield as soon as Ace leaves for an inspection on the exterior before getting distracted and called away by someone else. Following this, Aly San San presents safety instructions to the guests. After the safety instructions, the StarSpeeder 1000 rises to the loading area. Once the doors to the StarSpeeder 1000 open, guests enter one of several ride simulators.

=== Ride experience ===
The ride sequence is randomised; guests riding Star Tours will experience four out of 21 different segments during each journey. This gives Star Tours the advantage of being both highly repeatable and constantly surprising. Even though guests can experience different journeys, the main priority is always delivering a Rebel spy to safety. The "rebel spy" is chosen from the guests on the ride vehicle and whose photo is displayed to all the riders, with the dialogue in the ride accommodating to their gender.

There are 26 random segments of the film: five opening segments, five primary destination segments, ten hologram message segments, and six ending destination segments. Combined, they allow for 1500 different possible ride experiences. Segments are chosen randomly with no regard to the chronology of the series, however characters and locations from the sequel trilogy are not mixed with other eras.

- After the doors close, C-3PO appears on the side screen and complains to R2-D2 (who is stationed on top of the ship) about the misunderstanding, but is ignored when the cockpit shield is automatically lowered and the StarSpeeder 1000 begins to take flight with C-3PO in it. The StarSpeeder 1000 takes off, although C-3PO protests he is not the captain. As the StarSpeeder 1000 is about to leave the Star Tours terminal:
  1. Darth Vader, Imperial stormtroopers, and jumptroopers (this segment offers a random variant in which Boba Fett is among the group) arrive to capture the Rebel spy aboard the StarSpeeder 1000. Vader uses a Force-grip to keep the StarSpeeder 1000 from escaping. The StarSpeeder 1000 fires its lasers at the Sith Lord, who deflects them with his lightsaber, allowing the shuttle to make a rapid exit backwards out of the hangar, with the Imperial TIE fighters chasing after it. The StarSpeeder 1000 then makes the jump to lightspeed.
  2. A variant of Segment 1, with First Order stormtroopers and Kylo Ren replacing Darth Vader.
  3. An Imperial probe droid attaches to the windshield and detects the presence of the Rebel spy on board the StarSpeeder 1000. At the same moment, Han Solo, facing detention by the Empire, opens fire on a platoon of stormtroopers and races up the boarding ramp of the Millennium Falcon. The Falcon takes off and launches out of the hangar with the StarSpeeder 1000 in hot pursuit. After a few maneuvers, the Millennium Falcon jumps away, and the StarSpeeder 1000 shoots down a couple of TIE fighters, takes a few shots at a Star Destroyer, causing severe damage to the bridge, then jumps to lightspeed, despite C-3PO's protests.
  4. A variant of Segment 3, with Ahsoka Tano in Han Solo's place against the Empire.
  5. Another variant of Segment 3, with a First Order probe droid and Rey in Han Solo's place against the First Order.
- After jumping to lightspeed, the StarSpeeder arrives at its primary destination:
  1. The StarSpeeder 1000 almost crash lands on Hoth amid a battle between the Rebels' snowspeeders and Imperial AT-ATs. After entering the combat zone against orders, an AT-AT fires at the StarSpeeder 1000, and the ship crashes in the snow, teetering on the edge of a cliff. The ship falls over the side and rides through the canyon like a luge, launching off another cliff and free-falling into a deep canyon. At the last second, R2-D2 re-engages the engines and the StarSpeeder 1000 rockets back into space.
  2. The StarSpeeder 1000 reaches Tatooine and takes part in the Boonta Eve Classic Podrace, along with Sebulba and other Podracer pilots Teemto Pagalies, Ratts Tyerell, Gasgano, Ebe Endocott, and Mars Guo. Ratts Tyerell crashes into the canyon wall, causing the StarSpeeder 1000 to collide with Teemto Pagalies's Podracer, which gives the StarSpeeder 1000 twice the power. Sebulba throws a tool at the StarSpeeder 1000's windshield and the race concludes with the enhanced StarSpeeder 1000 overtaking Sebulba for 1st place, crossing the finish line and jettisoning the Podracer before flying back into space, narrowly missing the crowd.
  3. The StarSpeeder 1000 lands on Kashyyyk, as scout troopers riding on speeder bikes chase Chewbacca and a Wookiee warrior on an ornithopter through the lush forest. A scout trooper gets hit by a tree branch and the Wilhelm scream can be heard. At one point, Chewbacca falls off from the back of his vehicle and hits the StarSpeeder 1000's windshield. The StarSpeeder 1000 flies through the Wookiee villages on top of the lush forest trees and passes the flying Kashyyyk blue bird creature. A Wookiee warrior swings on the vines while doing the Tarzan yell through the villages. The StarSpeeder 1000 passes through the forest tree branches before blasting off into space.
  4. The StarSpeeder 1000 arrives on Jakku, where it follows the Millennium Falcon (piloted by either Finn or Rey) as it is pursued by First Order TIE fighters over the desert landscape. The Millennium Falcon accidentally shoots the StarSpeeder 1000 with its turret, causing the StarSpeeder 1000 to crash-land in the remains of a destroyed Star Destroyer, where scavengers pry the Star Tours logo off the StarSpeeder 1000. The StarSpeeder 1000 finds a way out and takes off into space.
  5. The StarSpeeder 1000 arrives in the Endor system and incurs a water landing on Kef Bir, riding the turbulent surf into the wreckage of the second Death Star. After a brief entanglement with a dianoga, the StarSpeeder 1000 manages to escape into space.
- After the StarSpeeder 1000 returns to space, either Admiral Ackbar, Princess Leia, Yoda, Poe Dameron, Maz Kanata, BB-8, Lando Calrissian, Ahsoka Tano, Cassian Andor, or the Mandalorian and Grogu transmits an urgent hologram message, relaying rendezvous coordinates to R2-D2.
- Despite C-3PO's protests, R2-D2 takes the speeder to the location's coordinates:
  1. The StarSpeeder 1000 arrives in the upper atmosphere during the battle of Coruscant, where the last forces of the CIS are piloting droid tri-fighters while vulture droids battle the Republic Army's Clone troopers ARC-170 starfighters. Buzz droids from the vulture droid's missile are projected at the StarSpeeder 1000, which attach themselves to the windshield. R2-D2 uses an electric shock to blast them off, but some of the buzz droids have already caused severe damage to the stabilizers. The powerless StarSpeeder 1000 then plummets through the planet's atmosphere and into the bustling sky traffic of the city planet. After several near misses, the StarSpeeder 1000 careens to a halt on a landing platform, nearly hitting a fuel tanker before crashing into a traffic control droid.
  2. The StarSpeeder 1000 arrives during the battle of Naboo. Naboo is under attack by the Trade Federation control ship armies. Three N-1 Naboo starfighters are ordered to lead the StarSpeeder 1000 into a hangar bay, but are shot down by vulture droids. Another vulture droid shoots down the StarSpeeder 1000, causing it to plummet into the ocean. The StarSpeeder 1000 then arrives near Otoh Gunga, sideswiping or smashing into Jar Jar Binks. After the Gungans order the StarSpeeder 1000 to follow the Gungan Bongo that will lead it through the planet's core, an opee sea killer attacks the guide, but is then eaten by a sando aqua monster. As the guide escapes, a colo claw fish tries to eat the StarSpeeder 1000, but R2-D2 blasts it with an electric shock. The StarSpeeder 1000 then surfaces, skipping off the water and into a hangar filled with starfighter debris. The StarSpeeder 1000 smashes into the tail of a Naboo starfighter, either breaking the windshield and angering the pit droid that falls into the cockpit, or merely breaking the tail of the starfighter, angering the pit droid, who then throws gold paint at the StarSpeeder 1000 and storms off.
  3. The StarSpeeder 1000 discovers the still-uncompleted Death Star orbiting Geonosis. Ambushed in the asteroid field by Boba Fett aboard Slave I, the StarSpeeder 1000 dodges laser fire and exploding asteroids before venturing into the Death Star. Escaping through a hangar bay, the StarSpeeder 1000 is confronted again by the bounty hunter. Fett launches a seismic charge, which is deflected back by a laser blast from the StarSpeeder 1000. The explosion cripples the bounty hunter, allowing the StarSpeeder 1000 to jump to lightspeed. It reaches the Rebel fleet, and lands aboard a Mon Calamari cruiser, where Rebel Alliance leaders await to offer congratulations.
  4. The StarSpeeder 1000 arrives on Crait and gets chased by First Order TIE fighters before descending into the planet's crystal mines. Escaping the mines from the First Order TIE fighters, the StarSpeeder flies over the salt flats, joining Resistance forces in an attack on the First Order AT-M6s and AT-ATs. The StarSpeeder 1000 is instructed by Poe Dameron to assist the Resistance in their siege against the First Order, led by General Hux's forces. A speeder passes in front of the StarSpeeder 1000 which causes the windshield to be covered in red salt before R2-D2 wipes it clean. General Hux questions Star Tours' presence and orders his fleet to destroy the ship. The StarSpeeder 1000 proceeds to destroy an AT-M6 before escaping into space. The StarSpeeder 1000 makes the jump to lightspeed and arrives on Batuu, touching down safely on the remote planet.
  5. The StarSpeeder 1000 arrives on Exegol to assist the Resistance in confronting the Sith Eternal's fleet, the Final Order. Led by General Dameron, the StarSpeeder 1000 engages in battle, successfully assisting in defeating the Sith Eternal forces. The StarSpeeder 1000 makes the jump to lightspeed, returning safely to the Star Tours terminal. Upon arrival, Ace can be seen running towards the ship in anger. (Sometimes, this sequence instead ends with the Batuu ending from the Crait sequence.)
  6. The StarSpeeder 1000 arrives on Seatos in the middle of a lightning storm. Ascending from the clouds, it is revealed that the ship is surrounded by puurgil. A moment later, Ahsoka Tano appears, pursued by combatants. R2 engages, much to the distress of C-3PO. After defeating the enemy, R2 does a barrel roll, and enters hyperspace once more, returning to the Star Tours terminal to make a haphazard landing.
- C-3PO thanks the guests for joining him and are then given disembarking instructions by Aly San San.

== Production ==
=== Cast ===
- Anthony Daniels as C-3PO
- James Earl Jones as Darth Vader (voice)
- Frank Oz as Yoda (voice)
- Tom Kane as Admiral Ackbar (voice)
- Carrie Fisher as Princess Leia (unused archival footage)
- Julie Dolan as Princess Leia (voice)
- Daisy Ridley as Rey Skywalker
- John Boyega as Finn
- Oscar Isaac as Poe Dameron
- Billy Dee Williams as Lando Calrissian
- Adam Driver as Kylo Ren (voice)
- Domhnall Gleeson as General Hux
- Lupita Nyong'o as Maz Kanata
- Rosario Dawson as Ahsoka Tano
- Diego Luna as Cassian Andor
- Pedro Pascal as The Mandalorian
- Dean De Anda as Boba Fett
- Dee Bradley Baker as Boba Fett (voice)
- Allison Janney as Aly San San (voice)
- Fred Tatasciore as Captain Tarpals (voice)
- Patrick Warburton as G2-4T, the thermal-scanner droid (voice)
- Paul Reubens as RX-24, the pilot droid from the original attraction (voice; archival audio)
- Marianne McLean as Mon Mothma
- Tom Fitzgerald as G2-9T, the luggage-scanning droid (voice)
- Alison Blanchard as the luggage-scan computer (voice)
- Lindsay Schnebly as AC-38 "Ace", the pilot droid (voice)
- Robin Atkin Downes as security guard
- Rob Howe as Rebel pilot
- April Royster as Naboo squad leader
- Darren Criss as miscellaneous voices
- Stephanie Taylor as Woman in boarding video

=== Music ===
John Williams, who composed the music for all the main Star Wars saga films, approached Imagineering about writing the music for the attraction. After evaluating the storyboards of the ride sequences, Williams determined that a newly written musical score was unnecessary. Instead, Williams suggested that the on-ride music should be existing themes and cues from the films, along with unused passages from the film scores that he and his music editor found. Michael Giacchino provided additional arrangements of various Star Wars themes for use in the commercials and pre-show videos in the attraction. Also, the signature Star Tours logo chimes, composed by Richard Bellis, remained in the attraction.

=== Ride system ===
StarSpeeder 1000 flying in Coruscant

The attraction combines high-definition video, a Dolby 3D high-definition screen, an improved motion simulator and several newly added special effects and Audio-animatronics.

Similar to its predecessor, Star Tours – The Adventures Continue utilizes the same hydraulic motion base cabin, patented as Advanced Technology Leisure Application Simulator (ATLAS), which features several degrees of freedom, including the ability to move 35 degrees in the X-Y-Z plane. In the original version, passengers rode in a vehicle named the "StarSpeeder 3000". Since the new attraction is set before the original film, the new ride vehicle is referred to as a "StarSpeeder 1000". The motion simulator itself was originally manufactured by Rediffusion Simulation.

== See also ==
- List of Disneyland attractions
- List of Disney's Hollywood Studios attractions
- List of Tokyo Disneyland attractions
- List of amusement rides based on film franchises
- Iron Man Experience
- Mission: Space
- Millennium Falcon – Smugglers Run
