= Star Tours =

Former attraction at Disney theme parks

- Attraction poster

Disneyland
- Area: Tomorrowland
- Coordinates: 33.8118°N 117.9177°W
- Status: Removed
- Cost: US$32 million
- Opening date: January 9, 1987; 39 years ago
- Closing date: July 26, 2010; 15 years ago
- Replaced: Adventure Thru Inner Space
- Replaced by: Star Tours – The Adventures Continue

Tokyo Disneyland
- Area: Tomorrowland
- Coordinates: 35.6334°N 139.8783°E
- Status: Removed
- Opening date: July 12, 1989; 36 years ago
- Closing date: April 1, 2012; 14 years ago
- Replaced by: Star Tours – The Adventures Continue

Disney's Hollywood Studios
- Area: Echo Lake
- Coordinates: 35.6334°N 139.8783°E
- Status: Removed
- Opening date: December 15, 1989; 36 years ago
- Closing date: September 7, 2010; 15 years ago
- Replaced by: Star Tours – The Adventures Continue

Disneyland Park (Paris)
- Area: Discoveryland
- Coordinates: 48.8751°N 2.7794°E
- Status: Removed
- Opening date: April 12, 1992; 34 years ago
- Closing date: March 16, 2016; 10 years ago
- Replaced by: Star Tours – The Adventures Continue

Ride statistics
- Attraction type: Motion simulator
- Manufacturer: Rediffusion Simulation
- Designer: Walt Disney Imagineering; Lucasfilm
- Music: Richard Bellis; John Williams (original themes)
- Vehicles: 4 (Disneyland); 6 (Disney's Hollywood Studios, Tokyo Disneyland and Disneyland Paris)
- Riders per vehicle: 40
- Participants per group: 40
- Duration: 4:30
- Height restriction: 40 in (102 cm)
- Audio-animatronics: Yes
- Host: Captain Rex (Paul Reubens)
- Disney's Fastpass was available
- Must transfer from wheelchair

Star Tours was a motion simulator attraction at several Disney theme parks, based on the successful Star Wars film series created by George Lucas. Set in the Star Wars universe, the attraction sent guests on an excursion trip to Endor, whilst being caught in an altercation between the New Republic and an Imperial Remnant. The attraction featured new character Captain RX-24 (Rex) along with series regulars R2-D2 and C-3PO.

At its debut at Disneyland in 1987, it was the first attraction based originally on a non-Disney licensed intellectual property. The first incarnation of the ride appeared in Tomorrowland at Disneyland in 1987, replacing the previous attraction, Adventure Thru Inner Space. The attraction had subsequent openings at Tokyo Disneyland, Disney's Hollywood Studios, and Disneyland Paris.

The attraction at Disneyland and Disney's Hollywood Studios closed in 2010 to allow conversion for its successor attraction, Star Tours – The Adventures Continue. The latter location was completed on May 20, 2011. Tokyo Disneyland and Disneyland Paris closed their versions for conversion in 2012 and 2016, marking the original ride's final run of 29 years.

== History ==
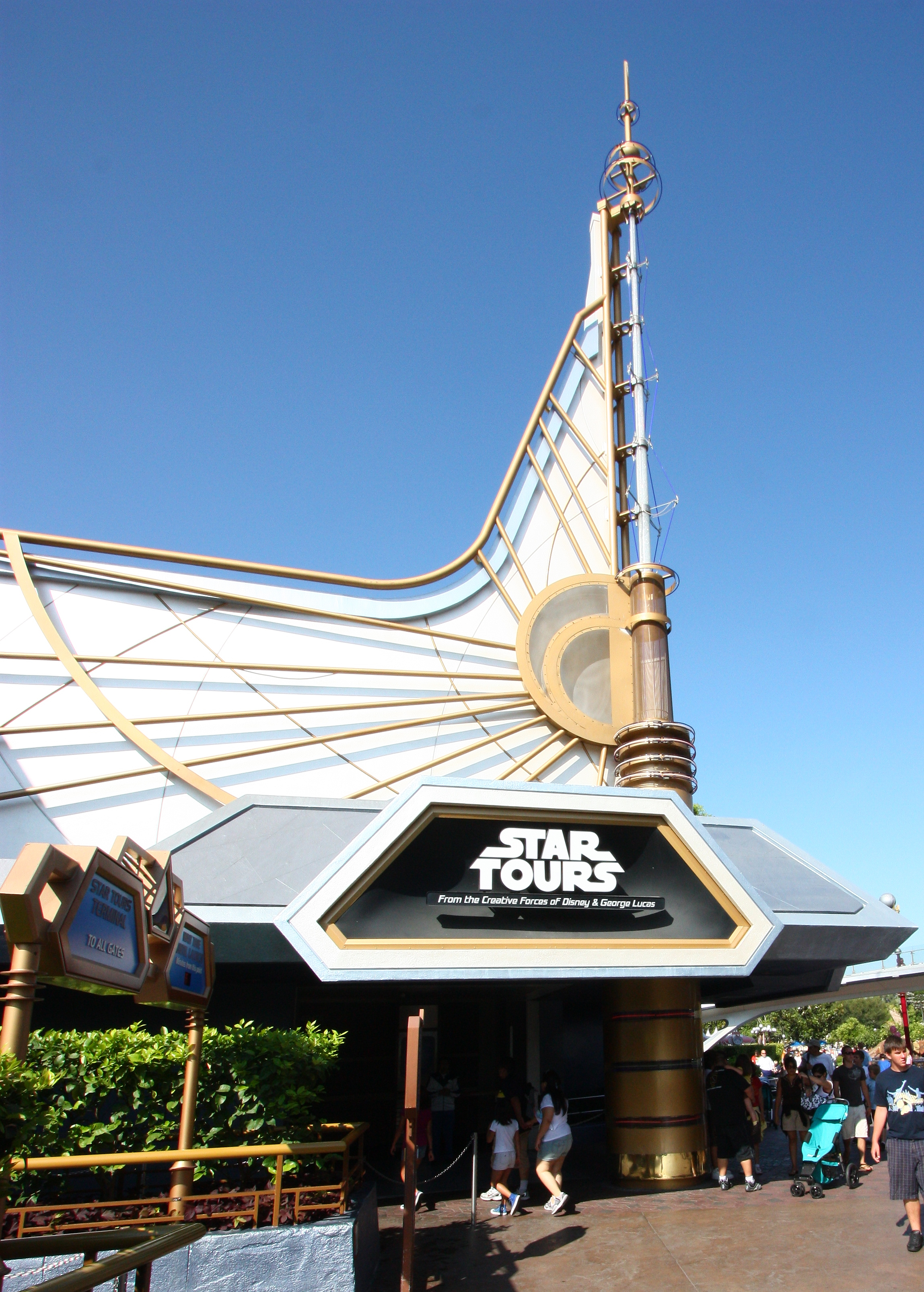
Attraction at Disneyland

The ride that became Star Tours first saw light as a proposal for an attraction based on the 1979 Disney live-action film The Black Hole. It would have been an interactive ride-simulator attraction where guests would have had the ability to choose the route. However, after preliminary planning, the Black Hole attraction was shelved due to its enormous cost as well as the unpopularity of the film itself.

Instead of completely dismissing the idea of a simulator, the company decided to make use of a partnership between Disney and George Lucas, the creator of Star Wars, that began in 1986 with the opening of Captain EO (a 3-D musical film starring Michael Jackson) at the California park. Disney then approached Lucas with the idea for Star Tours. With Lucas's approval, Disney Imagineers purchased four military-grade flight simulators at a cost of $500,000 each and designed the ride structure.

Meanwhile, Lucas and his team of special effects technicians at Industrial Light & Magic produced the first-person perspective film that would be projected inside the simulators. When both simulator and film were completed, a programmer then sat inside and used a joystick to synchronize the movement of the simulator with the apparent movement on screen. On January 9, 1987, at a final cost of $32 million, the ride opened to throngs of patrons, many of whom dressed up as Star Wars characters for the occasion. In celebration, Disneyland remained open for a 60-hour marathon from January 9 at 10 a.m. to January 11 at 10 p.m.

=== Closure ===
On August 14, 2010, Disney's Hollywood Studios hosted the "Last Tour To Endor" event exclusively for Celebration V attendees at Disney's Hollywood Studios from 8pm to 1am. Entertainment features and events at "Last Tour To Endor" included George Lucas, character appearances, Jedi Training Academy, Death Star Disco, Bespin Stage Dance Party, Raiders Of The Lost Jedi Temple of Doom: A Fan Film of Epic Proportions live show, Hyperspace Hoopla, Symphony in the Stars fireworks, and the Star Tours shutdown ceremony. The Star Tours shutdown ceremony was a live show with characters C-3PO, R2-D2, Boba Fett, Darth Vader, and a few Stormtroopers, culminating in the official power-down of the original Disney World Star Tours attraction. However, instead of R2-D2 simply shutting it down, Boba Fett destroyed the ride's power supply using a thermal detonator (achieved using pyrotechnics). The ride was still open after the shutdown ceremony until September 7, 2010, when the attraction held its "Final Flight to Endor" exclusive to D23 members.

== Attraction ==
=== Queue ===
Advertised as "The Ultimate Star Wars Adventure!", Star Tours puts the guest in the role of a space tourist en route to the Forest Moon of Endor, the site of the climactic battle of Return of the Jedi, via the Star Tours travel agency. Much was made of this throughout the ride queue, which was designed to look like a spaceship boarding terminal: posters advertised voyages to different planets, and a giant screen informed riders of the benefits of going to Endor. This area was stocked with Audio-Animatronic characters that seemed to speak to the ride patrons (including C-3PO and R2-D2), as well as a life-size mock-up of a StarSpeeder 3000, the fictional spacecraft which riders were about to board. According to the book Disneyland Detective by Kendra Trahan, the figures of C-3PO and R2-D2 in the Disneyland attraction were actual props from the original trilogy, modified to operate via Audio-Animatronics.

Guests then enter a maintenance area where an apparently underproductive G2 droid performs repairs on another droid while being distracted by the observing guests, and another droid inadvertently points out all the supposed flaws of the StarSpeeder 3000 and its RX pilots. A ride attendant escorts guests to one of several loading stations where they wait for their turn to ride.

=== Pre-show ===
A television screen above the queue displays a countdown to take-off time and shows images of the StarSpeeder 3000 spacecraft being serviced. As launch time approaches, a safety video is shown featuring Star Wars aliens, Disney Imagineers, and their families. It instructs guests how to fasten their seat belts and where to place belongings. Once the doors to the starspeeder open, guests walk across bridges into one of the several starspeeder cabins.

=== Ride experience ===
As the doors close, the bumbling pilot droid of the ship, RX-24 or Rex (voiced by Paul Reubens), appears on the side screen and chats to the guests about the trip as R2-D2 is loaded onto the spacecraft.

Rex lowers the cockpit shield, and the hangar crew activate the flight platform. All goes well until a slight mistake on Captain Rex's part sends the starspeeder crashing into the maintenance bay doors and plummeting into the maintenance yard. They barely crash into the control room and nearly collide with a giant mechanical arm. Once in space, Rex asks R2-D2 to make the jump to lightspeed. However, the ship accidentally passes the Endor moon and instead gets caught inside a comet cluster. The ship gets hit by several comets before getting trapped in one of the larger comets. The StarSpeeder weaves its way through the comet and escapes by crashing through one of the walls. Upon escaping the comet, however, the ship encounters a Star Destroyer of the Imperial remnant.

The StarSpeeder gets caught in its tractor beam, but manages to get loose when a New Republic X-wing fighter provides assistance by destroying the tractor beam generator. Soon the StarSpeeder accompanies the Republic fleet on an assault on the Death Star III (later revealed by Leland Chee in 2013 to be a habitation sphere disguised as a Death Star in a plot by an Imperial warlord to distract the New Republic). Rex uses the StarSpeeder's lasers to eliminate several TIE fighters while a Republic pilot destroys the Death Star in the same manner as Luke Skywalker by firing two proton torpedoes into the exhaust port. The X-wings jump to lightspeed as the Death Star explodes, and a final lightspeed jump sends the StarSpeeder back to the spaceport, nearly colliding with a fuel truck in the hangar and sending a Star Tours employee ducking under his desk. As the cockpit shield raises and cuts off Rex as he apologizes for the near-fatal flight, C-3PO instructs the passengers on the exit procedure and thanks them, oblivious to the perils they had faced. The exit doors opposite the entrance then open and the passengers proceed across another set of bridges into the exit hall towards the Star Trader gift shop.

=== Cast ===
==== English ====
- Anthony Daniels – C-3PO (voice and action)
- Ben Burtt – R2-D2
- Paul Reubens – Captain RX-24, a.k.a. Rex (voice)
- Brian Cummings – Vid-Screen Announcer (planetary destinations) (voice)
- Stephanie Taylor – Safety Instructor
- Steve Gawley – cameo as Red Leader (onboard video)
- Warwick Davis – cameo as Wicket the Ewok

==== Japanese dub ====
- Yūji Mitsuya – Captain RX-24, a.k.a. Rex (voice)

==== French dub ====
- Anthony Daniels – C-3PO
- Luq Hamet – voice of Captain RX-24 (Rex)

Muren, Gawley, and Keeler were all Industrial Light & Magic computer animation staff. One year earlier, Reubens had voiced the shipboard computer in the Disney film Flight of the Navigator (credited as Paul Mall), in which his character was named Max. Reubens credited this role with his being cast for the ride.

=== Ride system ===
Star Tours utilized hydraulic motion base cabins featuring six degrees of freedom, including the ability to move 35 degrees in the X-Y-Z plane. The simulator was patented as Advanced Technology Leisure Application Simulator (ATLAS), originally designed by Rediffusion Simulation in Sussex, England, now owned by Thales Training & Simulation (ex-Thomson-CSF). The Rediffusion 'Leisure' simulator was originally developed for a much simpler show in Canada called "Tour of the Universe", where it featured a single entrance/exit door in the rear of the cabin and a video projector. The film was front-projected onto the screen from a 70 mm film projector located beneath the cockpit barrier. The Disneyland original had four simulators, while the Tokyo Disneyland, Disneyland Paris, and Disney's Hollywood Studios versions each had six motion bases.

== Successor ==
The successor attraction, Star Tours – The Adventures Continue, opened in Disney's Hollywood Studios on May 20, 2011, and at Disneyland on June 3, 2011, replacing the parks' original Star Tours attractions. It features an updated ride system, consisting of a new high-definition video, a Dolby 3D high-definition screen, improved motion simulators, and several new special effects and Audio-animatronics. The attraction is set at an earlier point in the Star Wars timeline (between Revenge of the Sith and A New Hope) and is piloted by C-3PO. Rex appears as a newly-delivered droid in the queue of The Adventures Continue, and as the house DJ of Oga's Cantina in Star Wars: Galaxy's Edge, with the latter considered official Star Wars canon and set roughly 3 decades after the events of the original Star Tours.

An episode of "The Mandalorian," a Star Wars series featured on the Disney+ streaming platform, featured a group of RX-series Droids.

== Gallery ==
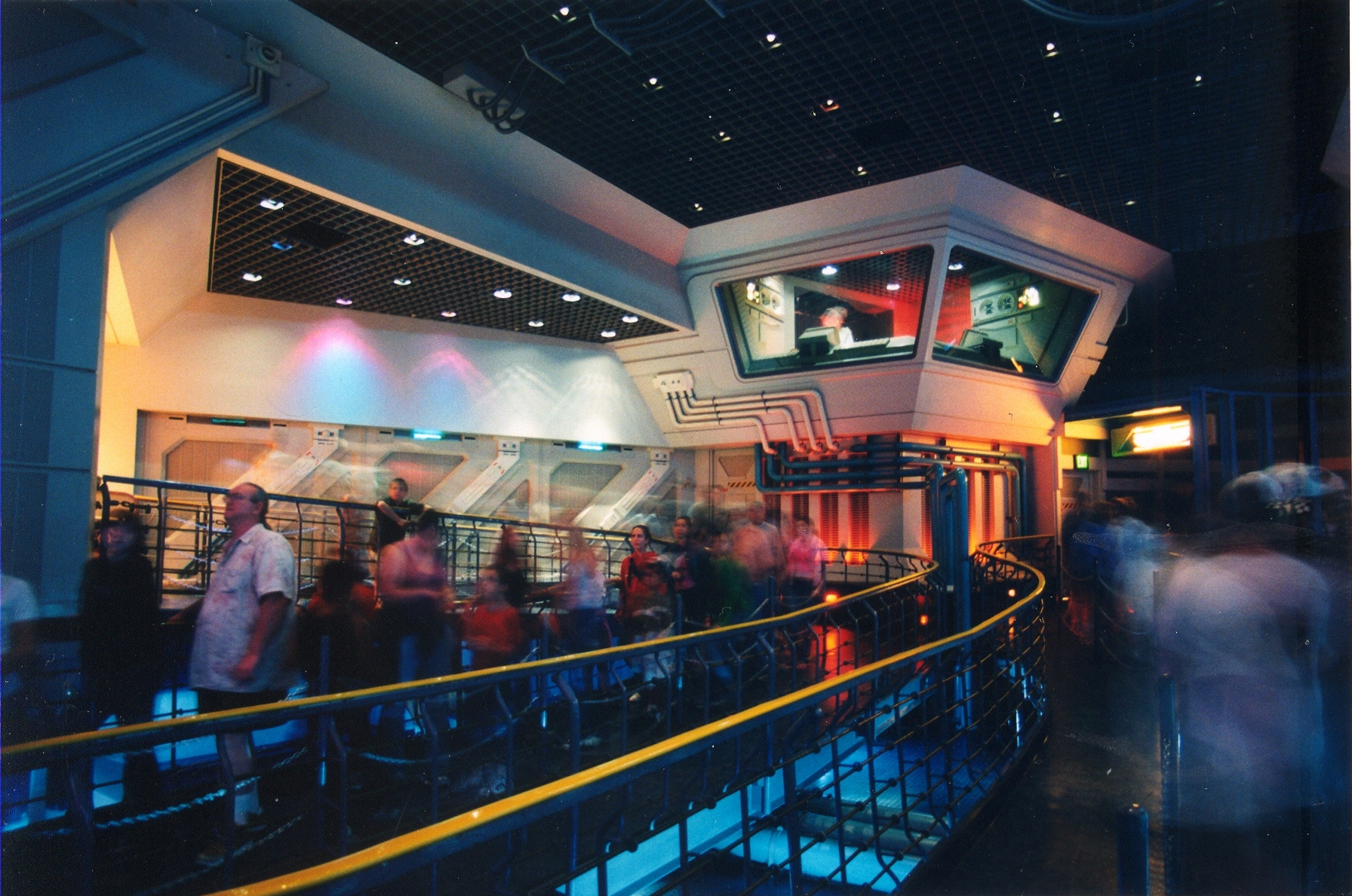
An Audio-animatronic Mon Calamari can be seen in the control booth.

The queue showing the Starspeeder 3000

Loading Area

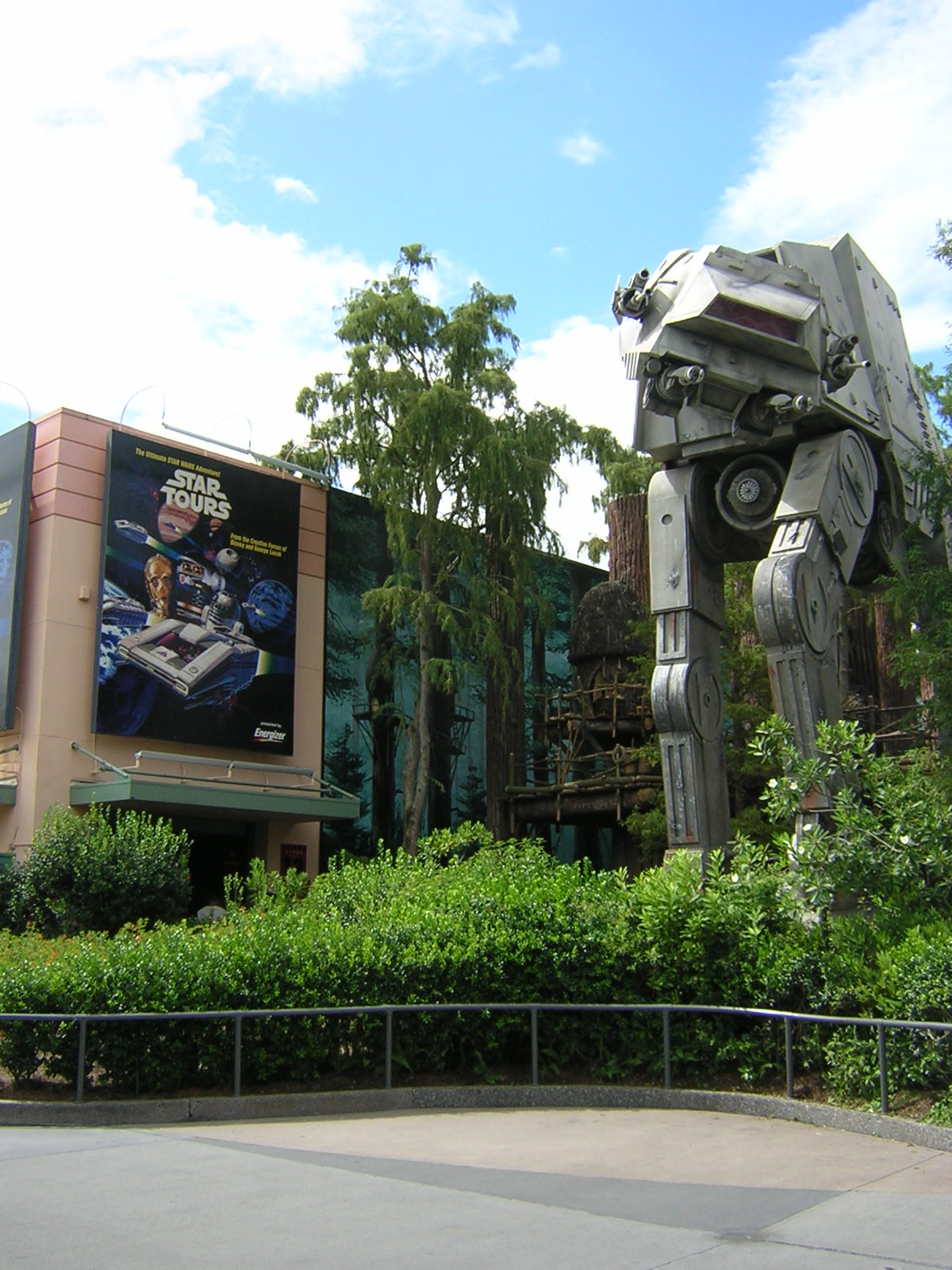
Disney's Hollywood Studios' entrance

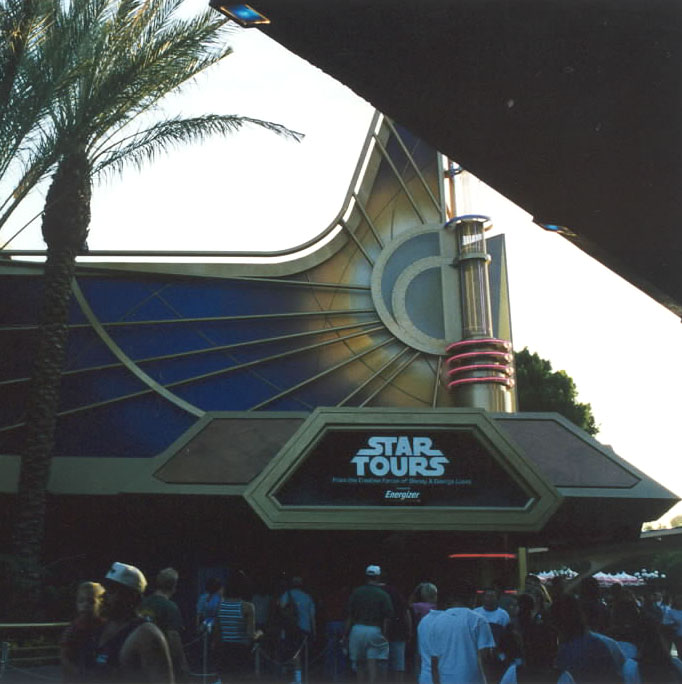
Disneyland's entrance in 1998 after the Tomorrowland makeover

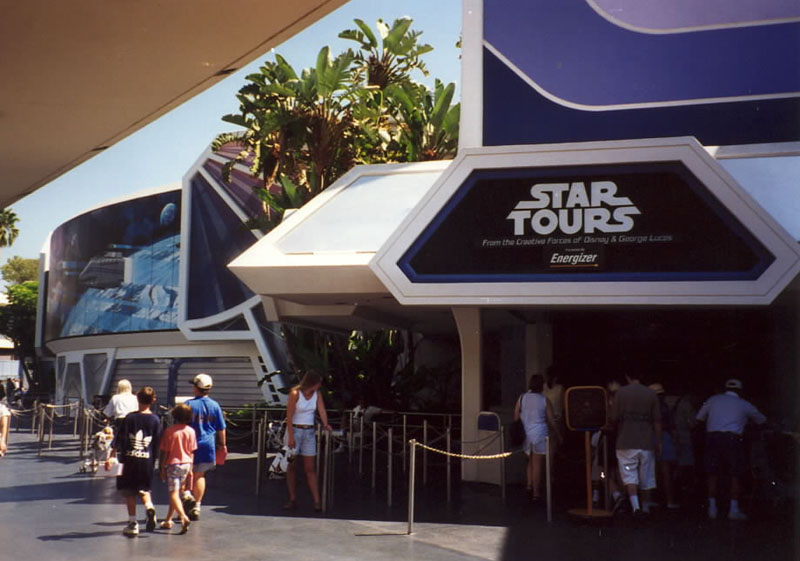
Disneyland's entrance in 1996 before Tomorrowland makeover

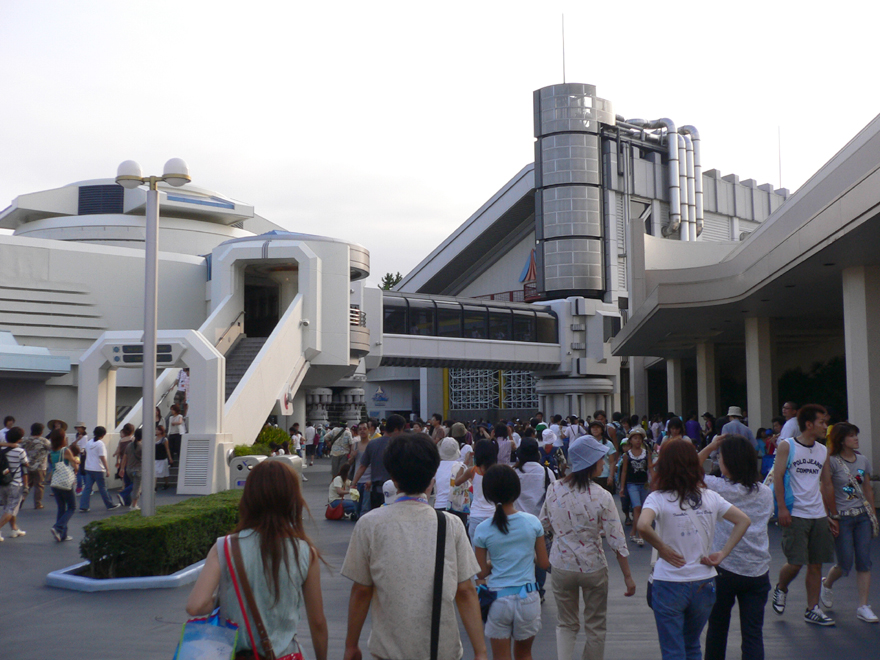
Tokyo Disneyland's entrance

== See also ==
- List of former Disneyland attractions
- Disney's Hollywood Studios attraction and entertainment history
- List of amusement rides based on film franchises
