= Adventure Thru Inner Space =

Former dark ride at Disneyland

Coordinates: 33°48′43″N 117°55′05″W

- Poster for Adventure Thru Inner Space

Disneyland
- Area: Tomorrowland
- Status: Removed
- Opening date: August 5, 1967
- Closing date: September 2, 1985
- Replaced: Monsanto Hall of Chemistry
- Replaced by: Star Tours

Ride statistics
- Attraction type: Dark ride
- Manufacturer: Arrow Development
- Designer: WED Enterprises
- Theme: Microscopic world
- Music: "Miracles from Molecules" written by the Sherman Brothers (music & lyrics)
- Vehicle type: Omnimover
- Riders per vehicle: 2–3
- Hosted by: Paul Frees
- Sponsor: The Monsanto Company (1967–1977)
- Must transfer from wheelchair

Adventure Thru Inner Space was an attraction in Disneyland's Tomorrowland, presented by Monsanto Company. It was the first attraction to utilize Disney's Omnimover system. The ride simulated shrinking guests to the size smaller than an atom (the "inner space") before taking a tour of snowflakes at molecular and atomic levels.

Adventure Thru Inner Space opened on August 5, 1967, as the centerpiece of the "New Tomorrowland", and closed in 1985 to make way for Disney and George Lucas's new Star Tours attraction, which opened in early 1987. The attraction was narrated by Paul Frees, who also lent his voice to the Haunted Mansion attraction, another Omnimover attraction which is still open to this day.

== History ==
The idea of the attraction goes as far back as 1957, when Walt Disney introduced a concept for an atomic-themed exhibit in Tomorrowland on the Disneyland television show episode, Our Friend The Atom. A newspaper profile in 1957 said that Disney was planning a ride to take guests inside a microscope, in order to promote science education. "There's a great urgency today to interest young people in science as a profession," he said. "I want to give them some attractions that will start kids thinking more about science." Disney became friends with Dr. Charles Allen Thomas, Chairman of the Monsanto Company, and Thomas was directly involved in the development of the attraction.

Plans for the attraction were put on hold for the 1964 New York World's Fair. After the success of the fair, the atomic-themed attraction was green-lighted for the New Tomorrowland project. It would stand where the "Monsanto's Hall of Chemistry" building stood.

The Disneyland Imagineers began with the idea of examining Monsanto's polymers, but decided that those molecules were too complex to explain. Instead, they settled on the idea of exploring a molecule of water, which was easy for guests to understand and relate to.

This was the first ride with an Omnimover system. It opened as a free attraction, unlike most, but required a "C" ticket starting in 1972. The original sponsor was Monsanto, which at the time was an agri-chemical company. The exit from the attraction led to a room displaying Monsanto's products.

== Synopsis ==
The attraction was designed to simulate humans shrinking to a size smaller than an atom (the "inner space"). As patrons waited in line, they saw those before them entering one end of the Monsanto Mighty Microscope. The other end of the Monsanto Mighty Microscope had a glass tube in which the supposedly miniaturized riders could be seen moving through. The microscope was aimed at a panel beyond which snow could be seen falling.

Upon boarding their 'Atommobiles', riders were greeted by the voice of an unseen scientist (Paul Frees) who explained: "I am the first person to make this fabulous journey. Suspended in the timelessness of inner space are the thoughtwaves of my first impressions. They will be our only source of contact once you have passed beyond the limits of normal Mag-ni-fi-ca-tion."

The Atommobile entered the Monsanto Mighty Microscope and began to shake back and forth as the riders entered the darkness. As their vision returned, the riders saw giant snowflakes all around them, some still spinning as they fell. As they continued to shrink, the narrator exclaimed, "I am passing beyond the magnification limits of even the most powerful microscopes. These are snowflakes – and yet they seem to grow larger and larger. Or can I be shrinking – shrinking beyond the smallness of a tiny snowflake crystal? Indeed, I am becoming smaller and smaller!"

The snowflakes took on a crystalline form, eventually becoming large enough to cover the entire field of the riders' vision. Approaching the walls of ice crystals, the voice of the unseen scientist marveled, "These tiny bits of snowflake crystal tower above me – like an enormous wall of ice. Can I penetrate this gigantic prism? And yet, this wall of ice only seems smooth and solid. From this tiny viewpoint, I can see that nothing is solid, no matter how it appears." Indeed, it then became obvious to the Atommobile riders that the ice crystals were not solid, but a lattice-like structure that they pass through. "And still I continue to shrink! What compelling force draws me into this mysterious darkness—can this be the threshold of inner space?"

Next, the riders encountered a matrix of spheres appearing in columns and rows of infinite length. "What are these strange spheres?" asked the narrator. "Have I reached the universe of the molecule? Yes, these are water molecules – H_{2}O. They vibrate in such an orderly pattern because this is water frozen into the solid state of matter."

As the travelers continued to shrink, the molecules became larger, and took on a peculiar Mickey Mouse shape. "These fuzzy spheres must be the atoms that make up the molecule – two hydrogen atoms bonded to a single oxygen atom. And I see that it's the orbiting electrons that give the atom its fuzzy appearance. And still I continue to shrink."

The scientist wondered, "Is it possible that I can enter the atom itself?" As the Atommobile entered the atom, a storm of lights flashed past on all sides at impossible speeds. "Electrons are dashing about me – like so many fiery comets! Can I possibly survive?"

Suddenly the frenzy of the electrons passed, and the riders found themselves in a large, empty space, surrounded in the distance by a sphere of slow-moving lights. "I have pierced the wall of the oxygen atom," continues the Narrator. "I am so infinitely small now that I can see millions of orbiting electrons. They appear like the Milky Way of our own solar system. This vast realm, THIS is the infinite universe within a tiny speck of snowflake crystal."

A large pulsating red ball could then be seen inside the atom. "And there is the nucleus of the atom! Do I dare explore the vastness of ITS inner space? No, I dare not go on. I must return to the realm of the molecule, before I go on shrinking...forever!"

The riders then began the return journey to full size, but were soon greeted with the sight of water molecules swirling rapidly. The scientist sees this as a discovery and says: "Ah, how strange! The molecules are so active now! They have become fluid – freed from their frozen state. That can only mean that the snowflake is melting!" The riders saw molecules around them, moving faster as their temperature increased. The molecules were depicted in green and yellow, with occasional star-shaped flashes representing evaporation.

"Yes, the snowflake has melted," intoned a scientist's voice (also Paul Frees), "But there is no cause for alarm. You are back on visual, and returning to your normal size." The riders could see evidence of the scientist's monitoring as they passed under a large microscope through which they could see his giant eye.

Having returned to normal size, the riders disembarked and passed by displays of Monsanto's advances in material science before exiting the attraction building.

== Miracles from Molecules ==
Like many of the WED Enterprises attractions of the 1960s, such as It's a Small World, the Carousel of Progress, and the Enchanted Tiki Room, Walt Disney assigned his staff songwriters, the Sherman Brothers, the task of writing an opening and closing song for the Adventure Thru Inner Space attraction. That song was Miracles from Molecules and bridged the ride message of adventure with the Monsanto company's mission statement.

The Mickey Mouse episode "Down the Hatch" features Donald Duck singing the song in the episode's credits.

In the Marvel Cinematic Universe-themed Disney Wish family dining experience Avengers: Quantum Encounter, Scott Lang and Hope van Dyne host a demonstration of Pym Particles called "Miracles From Molecules," featuring a new instrumental version of the song.

== Closing ==
In 1977, Monsanto ended their sponsorship for the attraction. All visual and audio references were removed (except for the end line, "This is Monsanto") and the Monsanto Mighty Microscope's Monsanto logo was replaced with a logo that says "The Mighty Microscope".

The Monsanto posters advertising their products were replaced with Disneyland posters. All the items in the display area were taken away and the gift shop took over all the area of the old post show area. Finally, the Monsanto "Fountain of Fashion" that dripped oil down strings tightened to it was replaced with a series of sculptures that looked like two plates put together with a snowflake on them. However, the shape of the old fountain/oil lamp was reused in the new sculpture. The attraction was finally closed in 1985 to be replaced with Star Tours in 1987.

A tribute to Adventure Thru Inner Space can be found in the Star Tours ride film. At the beginning of the ride, when the StarSpeeder is sent into a maintenance bay after going down a wrong path, the Mighty Microscope can be seen at the bottom of the maintenance area. This near-miss with the Mighty Microscope is featured in all versions of Star Tours. Star Tours itself was closed and replaced with Star Tours: The Adventures Continue at Disneyland and Disney's Hollywood Studios in 2011. The Adventures Continue again pays tribute to Adventure Thru Inner Space, with the Mighty Microscope visible when escaping the under-construction Death Star above Geonosis.
