= Iron Man Experience =

Attraction at Hong Kong Disneyland

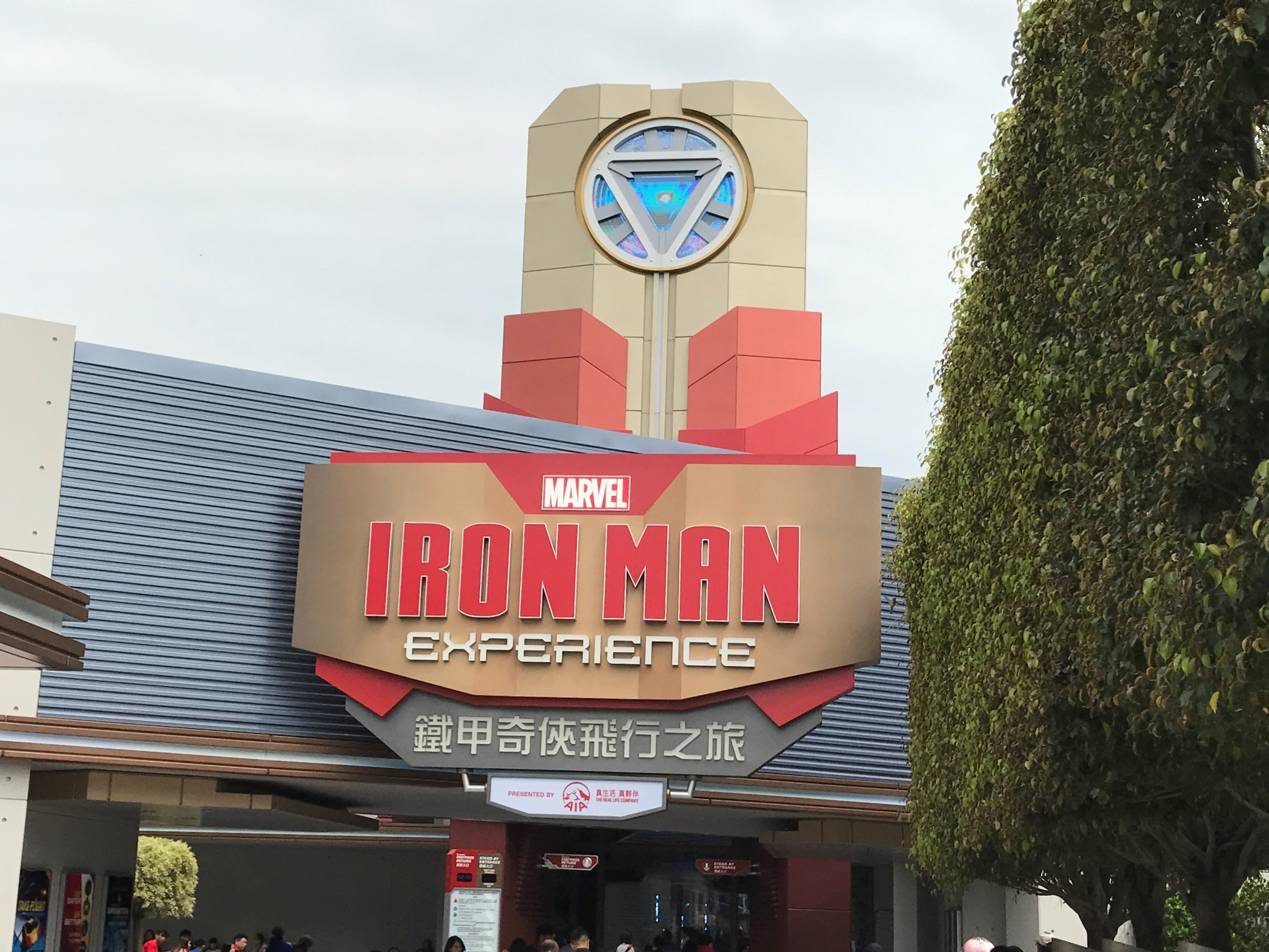

Hong Kong Disneyland
- Area: Tomorrowland (2017–present)
- Status: Operating
- Soft opening date: 16 December 2016; 9 years ago
- Opening date: 11 January 2017; 9 years ago

Ride statistics
- Attraction type: 3-D Motion simulator
- Manufacturer: Thales Training & Simulation
- Designer: Walt Disney Imagineering
- Theme: Iron Man
- Capacity: 2,036 riders per hour
- Vehicle type: Motion simulator
- Riders per vehicle: 45
- Duration: 4:30
- Height restriction: 102 cm (3 ft 4 in)
- Sponsor: AIA Group
- Host: Wendy Wong (Elizabeth Pan)
- Must transfer from wheelchair

Iron Man Experience (Traditional Chinese: 鐵甲奇俠飛行之旅) is a 3-D motion simulator attraction in Tomorrowland at Hong Kong Disneyland, which opened on 11 January 2017 (originally scheduled for 2016). The attraction is based on the Marvel Cinematic Universe character Iron Man, becoming the first Disney attraction to be based on a Marvel property. The attraction is located at the park's Tomorrowland section, in an area named "Stark Expo".

== Plot ==
Set in the Marvel Cinematic Universe a few years after the 2010 New York Stark Expo, Tony Stark (voiced by Mick Wingert) invites the visitors aboard the Iron Wing for a tour of Hong Kong, including the newly constructed Stark Tower. However, Hydra launches an attack on the city, led by Dr. Arnim Zola, forcing Tony to don the Iron Man armour and fight the menace alongside the Iron Wing.

== History ==
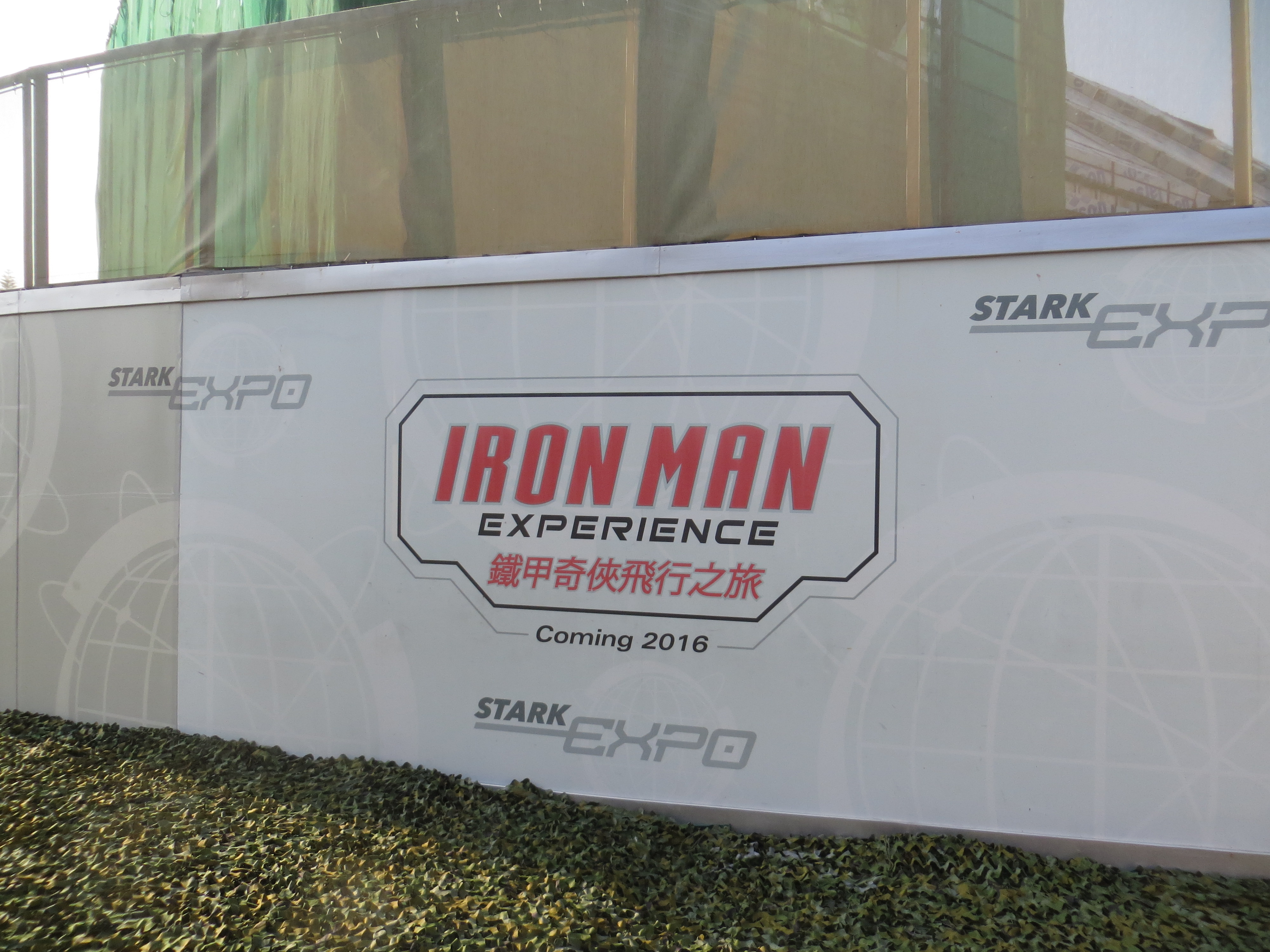
Iron Man Experience construction site.

Discussions of creating Marvel attractions at Walt Disney Parks and Resorts' theme parks began in 2009, with the Walt Disney Company's acquisition of Marvel Entertainment. In his 2013–2014 budget speech, Hong Kong's financial secretary John Tsang announced that a new nighttime parade as well as a themed area featuring characters from the Marvel Universe would be built in Hong Kong Disneyland. On 8 October 2013, Walt Disney Parks and Resorts chairman Thomas O. Staggs announced that Hong Kong Disneyland would be adding the Iron Man Experience. Walt Disney Imagineering designed the attraction and Industrial Light & Magic created the computer-generated visual effects. Due to the construction of Iron Man Experience, Hong Kong Disneyland Railroad was suspended from 17 February 2014, until 29 June 2015, and the Fastpass service of Buzz Lightyear Astro Blasters was suspended until late 2016. Testing for the ride began in May 2016. The attraction is estimated to have cost $100 million, and employs a newer generation model of the Advanced Technology Leisure Application Simulator used in Star Tours – The Adventures Continue.

The ride opened near an interactive "Become Iron Man" experience in Expo Shop, which includes themed merchandise and a character greeting with Iron Man. On 31 March 2019, Ant-Man and the Wasp: Nano Battle! opened in the nearby S.H.I.E.L.D. Science and Technology Pavilion. Following the announcement, Hong Kong Disneyland announced that the attractions are now part of the Stark Expo area.

== See also ==
- Guardians of the Galaxy – Mission: Breakout!
- Star Tours – The Adventures Continue
- Ant-Man and the Wasp: Nano Battle!
- Web Slingers: A Spider-Man Adventure
