= Advanced Technology Leisure Application Simulator =

Large hydraulic motion simulator

The Advanced Technology Leisure Application Simulator, or ATLAS, is a large hydraulic motion simulator. It was designed, as the name implies, for the theme park industry. The ATLAS is a product of Rediffusion Simulation in Sussex, England, now owned by Thales Group and known as Thales Training & Simulation. Disney filed multiple patents on their variant of the device, including US Utility Patent #5161104 .

The ATLAS was derived from military flight simulation technology. It uses six hydraulic actuators to provide a broad range of movement.

In the later half of the 1980s, Walt Disney Imagineering bought and refined this technology for two theme park attractions; Star Tours at Disneyland (and later Disney's Hollywood Studios, Tokyo Disneyland, and Disneyland Park) and Body Wars at Epcot. The technology was also used in 2016 for the Iron Man Experience at Hong Kong Disneyland. The Disney attractions feature large, 40-person cabins (45-person in Hong Kong) hidden from outside view, arranged lengthwise with four or six simulators per installation. There are four simulators at Disneyland's Star Tours and EPCOT's Body Wars, while the remaining Star Tours installations have six. At Hong Kong Disneyland's Iron Man Experience, there are five simulators. Body Wars is now defunct and the simulators have been removed from the building in the years since the closure of the Wonders of Life pavilion.
