= Star Wars Celebration =

Star Wars fan convention

- Status: Active
- Genre: Space Opera
- Frequency: Recurring
- Years active: 1999–present
- Inaugurated: April 30, 1999; 27 years ago
- Most recent: April 20, 2025; 18 months ago
- Next event: April 1, 2027; 4 months' time
- Organizer: ReedPOP
- Website: www.starwarscelebration.com

Star Wars Celebration is a large fan convention held to celebrate Lucasfilm's Star Wars franchise. The event is usually held every one to three years in varying locations around the world, and commonly features a host of Star Wars project announcements, panel discussions featuring actors, producers and writers, screenings, exhibits, cosplay and merchandise sales.

It began in 1999, when Lucasfilm held the first Star Wars Celebration in Denver, Colorado to celebrate the upcoming release of Star Wars: Episode I – The Phantom Menace.

== History ==
=== Star Wars Celebration ===
==== Celebration I ====
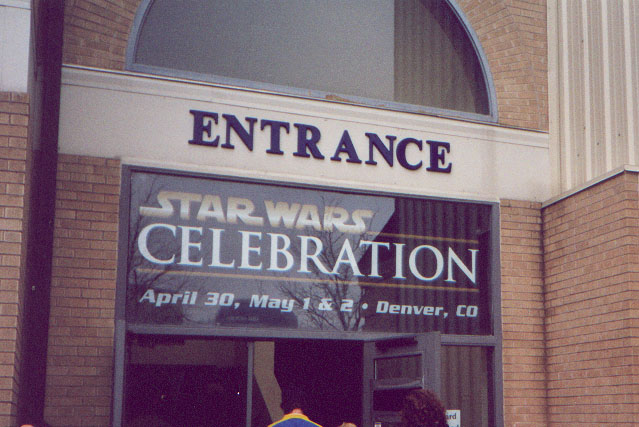
Star Wars Celebration I main entrance

The Star Wars Celebration was held from April 30 to May 2, 1999, at the Wings Over the Rockies Air and Space Museum in Denver, Colorado, just three weeks before the release of The Phantom Menace. An event "for the fans, by the fans," the event took place in the hometown of the Official Star Wars Fan Club, headed by Dan Madsen. "The Fan Club is based here in Denver," says Madsen, "so we thought it would only be appropriate that the Celebration be held here."

The first Star Wars convention since 1987, the Celebration held activities including actor panels, THX theater demonstrations, behind the scenes footage from Episode I, and the world premiere of the "Duel of the Fates" music video. The grounds boasted a vendors tent, and the museum hosted an exhibition consisting of props from the official LucasFilm archives, including a full-scale model of Anakin Skywalker's podracer and a life-size X-wing model (a 3/4 scale replica made in 1996 for the Special Edition release, and still residing at Wings Over the Rockies Air and Space Museum).

==== Celebration II ====
From May 3 to 5, 2002, Celebration II was held to celebrate the upcoming release of Attack of the Clones and the 25th anniversary of the first theatrically released Star Wars film. The convention was moved to Indianapolis, Indiana, to make use of the larger Indiana Convention Center.

Downtown Indianapolis was invaded by multitudes of Star Wars fans. The initial projection of 15–20,000 people per day based on advance ticket sales was well surpassed and reached critical mass on Saturday. The estimated final tally was a little over 75,000 people for the three-day event. The two busiest spots were the Fan Club store and the autograph section, specifically for Carrie Fisher. Highlights of the event included the Rick McCallum Spectacular and the Star Wars 25th Anniversary Concert on Saturday night, performed by the Philharmonic Orchestra of Indianapolis.

==== Celebration III ====
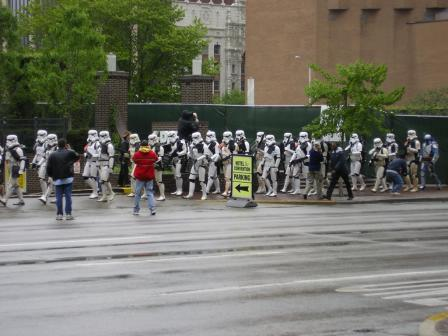
Members of the 501st Stormtrooper Legion march at Celebration III.

The Star Wars Celebration returned to Indianapolis from April 21 to 24, 2005, to commemorate the release of what was then thought to be the final film in the saga, Revenge of the Sith. With over 34,000 fans in attendance over the course of four days, Celebration III brought actor panels, costume contests, fan films, and diorama building to the Indiana Convention Center. The Lucasfilm archive provided many important props and costumes for display. One of this Celebration's most noteworthy events was the unprecedented Q&A session with Star Wars creator George Lucas, his first such appearance since the Star Wars 10th Anniversary Convention in 1987. With approximately 10,000 fans in attendance (over the course of 3 half-hour sessions), Lucas personally answered several dozen fans' questions about the saga.

==== Celebration IV ====
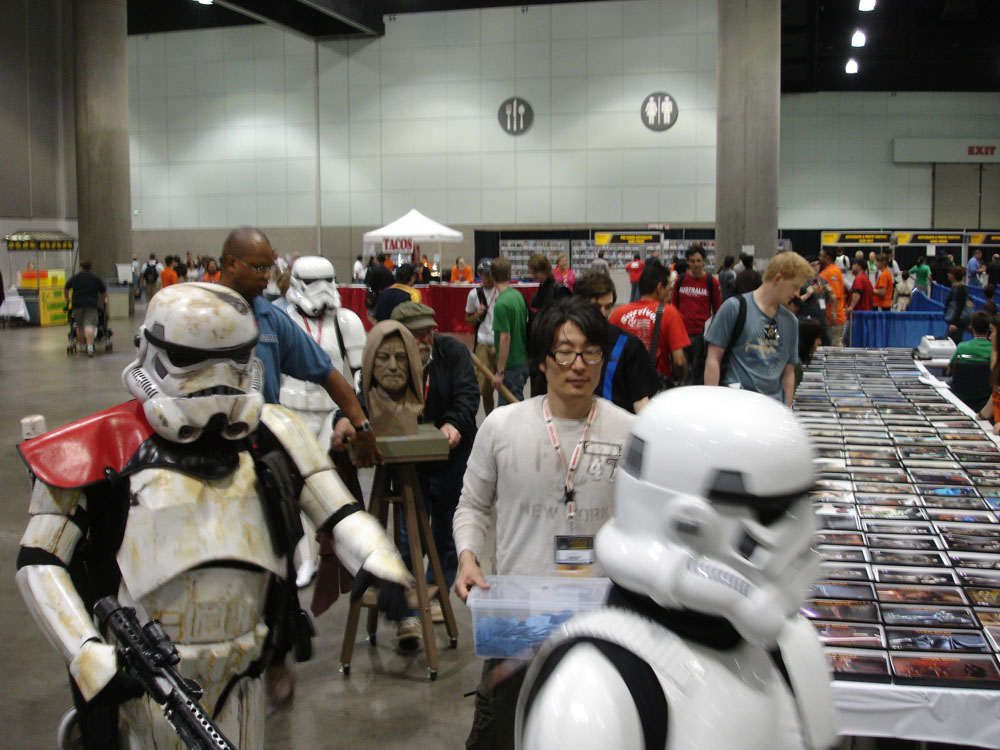
The 501st legion guards an Obi-Wan bust at Star Wars Celebration IV.

On May 26, 2006, StarWars.com announced Star Wars Celebration IV (C4) to be held from May 24 to 28, 2007, to commemorate the 30th anniversary of the first Star Wars film. C4 was located at the Los Angeles Convention Center in Los Angeles, where most E3 events were held. The convention offered a record number of celebrities in the autograph hall, multiple exhibitors, a Star Wars art show, a Darth Vader helmet and Lucasfilm archive exhibits and many fan oriented activities. In addition, there were collector and costuming panels, including sneak peeks of the upcoming Clone Wars animated series. Fans were the first to see the footage of this series on Sunday morning as well. Other highlights included conversations with Carrie Fisher and Billy Dee Williams, a visit from Seth MacFarlane and Seth Green for special Star Wars episodes of Family Guy and Robot Chicken respectively, and an efficiently organized Celebration Store. An estimated 35,000 people walked through the doors for Celebration IV over the Memorial Day weekend.

After the event, Lucasfilm sued the hosting entity, GenCon, for a variety of reasons, forcing GenCon into Chapter 11 bankruptcy.

==== Celebration V ====
Lucasfilm announced in 2008 that a US-based four-day Star Wars convention called "Celebration V" would be held in the summer of 2010. In July 2008, Steve Sansweet, director of content management and head of fan relations for Lucasfilm, announced that Baltimore, Minneapolis, Chicago, Indianapolis, Los Angeles, Anaheim, and Orlando, Florida were competing to host this event. Organizers anticipated that 30,000 Star Wars fans would attend no matter which city was selected.

Reed Exhibitions and Lucasfilm announced on December 3, 2009, that Orlando would host the event. Celebration V took place at the Orange County Convention Center from August 12 to 15, 2010. The convention celebrated the 30th anniversary of the second Star Wars movie, The Empire Strikes Back. It also included many features of previous Celebrations (such as Star Wars celebrity appearances, costume contests, and other fan events) as well as a special one-hour interview between Jon Stewart and George Lucas called "The Main Event". Celebration V marked the first American Celebration appearance for Mark Hamill (Luke Skywalker) and the last American appearance for Caroline Blakiston (Mon Mothma). Attendance was estimated at 32,000.

Lucas also made an appearance at the nearby Disney's Hollywood Studios to take part in the "Last Tour to Endor Event", which provided special entertainment for those individuals who attended "Celebration V".

==== Celebration VI ====
StarWarsCelebration.com announced on June 2, 2011, that Celebration VI would be held in Orlando, FL at the Orange County Convention Center (OCCC) from August 16 to 19, 2012. The event was later delayed by a week. The convention was held in the same hall of the OCCC as was Celebration V, with a very similar format. Several celebrities returned for appearances at this Celebration (including Mark Hamill, Carrie Fisher, and Anthony Daniels), and this event marked the first American Celebration attended by Ian McDiarmid. George Lucas had not been scheduled to attend, but made a "surprise" appearance. The event hosted the announcement of Star Wars Detours. Attendance was estimated at 35,000 people.

=== Star Wars Celebration Europe ===
==== Celebration Europe ====
On September 25, 2006, StarWars.com announced Star Wars Celebration Europe (CE) to be held from July 13 to 15, 2007, to commemorate the 30th anniversary of the first Star Wars film. CE was to be located at Earls Court in London. But on November 22, 2006, StarWars.com announced due to Advance interest in Celebration Europe the event would be moved to the larger venue located at the ExCeL Exhibition Centre in London. The event also had on display some of the largest restored Star Wars Arcade collection, estimated at around 30 to 40 machines, many of them now rarely seen in the USA or in other parts of Europe. An estimated 30,000 people attended this convention.

==== Celebration Europe II ====
It was announced at the closing ceremonies of Celebration VI (and confirmed on StarWarsCelebration.com) that Celebration Europe II would be held in Essen, Germany, at the Messe Essen fair venue from July 26 to 28, 2013. Major panels were Kathleen Kennedy's inaugural Star Wars Celebration appearance and the first look at Star Wars Rebels. Over 20,000 people attended the event from 40 different countries. The convention celebrated the 30th anniversary of the third Star Wars movie, Return of The Jedi.

==== Celebration Europe 2016 ====
The eleventh Star Wars Celebration took place from July 15 to 17, 2016, at the ExCel center in London, England (the second Celebration at the venue). The convention celebrated the upcoming film Rogue One: A Star Wars Story. Directors Phil Lord and Chris Miller and actor Alden Ehrenreich also attended the event to promote the film Solo: A Star Wars Story. "Jedi Master VIP Tickets" sold out immediately. Original trilogy stars Kenny Baker and Carrie Fisher died in 2016.

==== Celebration Europe 2023 ====
The fifteenth Star Wars Celebration was held at the ExCel Centre in London, England (the third Celebration at the venue) from April 7 to 10, 2023, which was part of The Walt Disney Company's centennial celebration. This celebration promoted several new Disney+ series including Ahsoka, The Acolyte and Skeleton Crew, and upcoming video game sequel, Jedi: Survivor. Indiana Jones and the Dial of Destiny was also promoted, and it was announced that Tales of the Jedi would return for a second season, and three new Star Wars films were in development after a long film hiatus, including a film set 15 years after the events of The Rise of Skywalker with Daisy Ridley returning as Rey. Additionally, the celebration commemorated the 40th anniversary of Return of the Jedi, with the film receiving a limited theatrical rerelease from April 28 to May 1 (in the United Kingdom) and from April 28 to May 4 (in the United States).

=== Star Wars Celebration Japan ===
==== Celebration Japan ====
On February 23, 2008, Lucasfilm Ltd. and the Lewis Daniel Group announced a three-day event known as "Celebration Japan", to be held at the Makuhari Messe Convention Center near Tokyo from July 19 to 21. The convention celebrated the 30th anniversary of the June 24, 1978, Japanese premiere of Star Wars. Celebration Japan included live entertainment, Star Wars celebrities, exclusive merchandise, special presentations, unique Star Wars exhibits, costume contests, and other activities.

==== Celebration Japan 2025 ====
It was announced on April 10, 2023 during the Celebration Europe 2023 closing ceremony that there would be no event in 2024. Instead, the next Celebration would be held in Japan in 2025. This three-day event was held at the Makuhari Messe Convention Center near Tokyo from April 18 to 20. During the first day, Shawn Levy's film Star Wars: Starfighter was announced with Ryan Gosling set to star.

=== Star Wars Celebration Anaheim ===
==== Celebration Anaheim 2015 ====
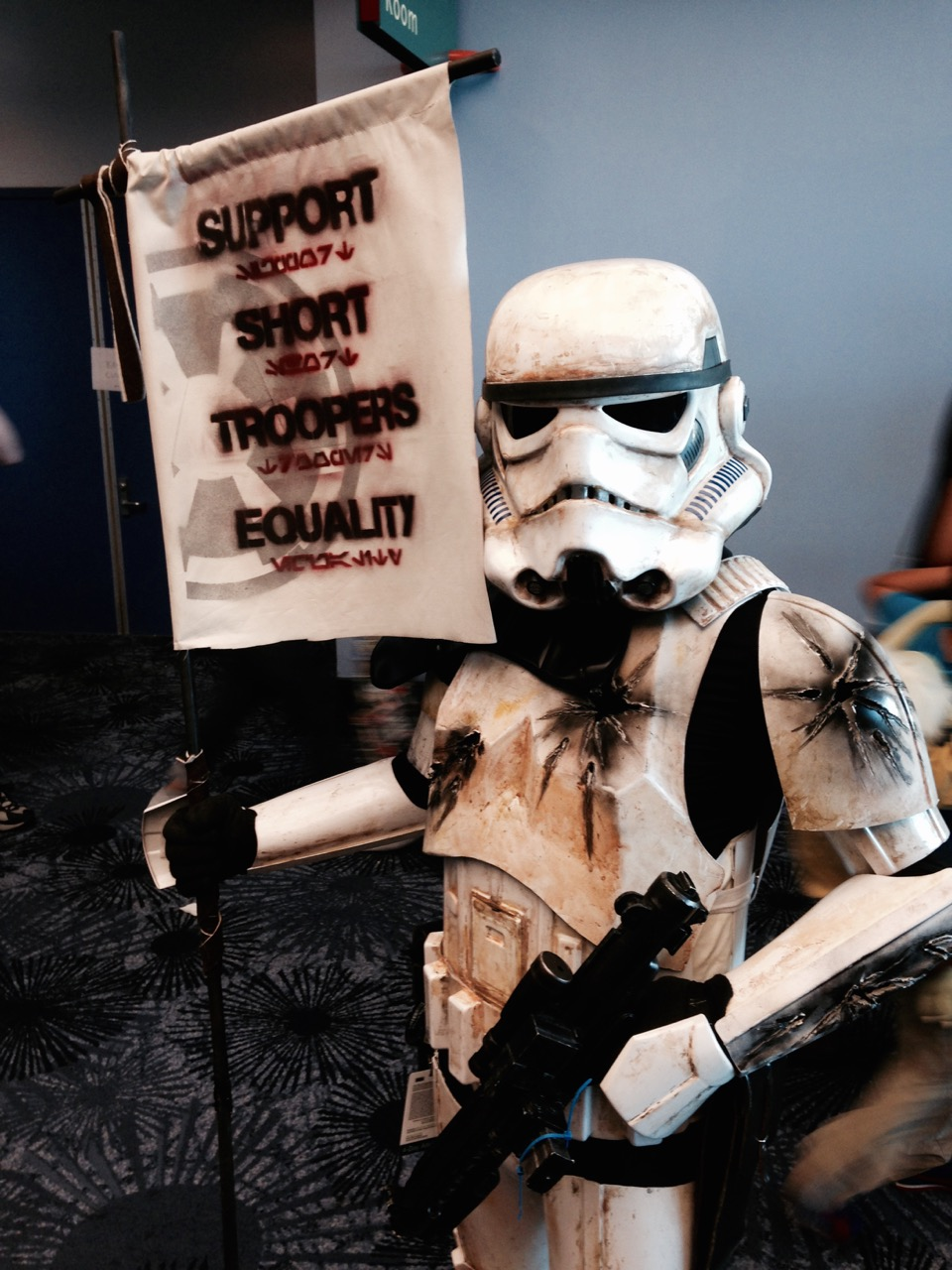
Star Wars Celebration 2015 - Short Stormtrooper

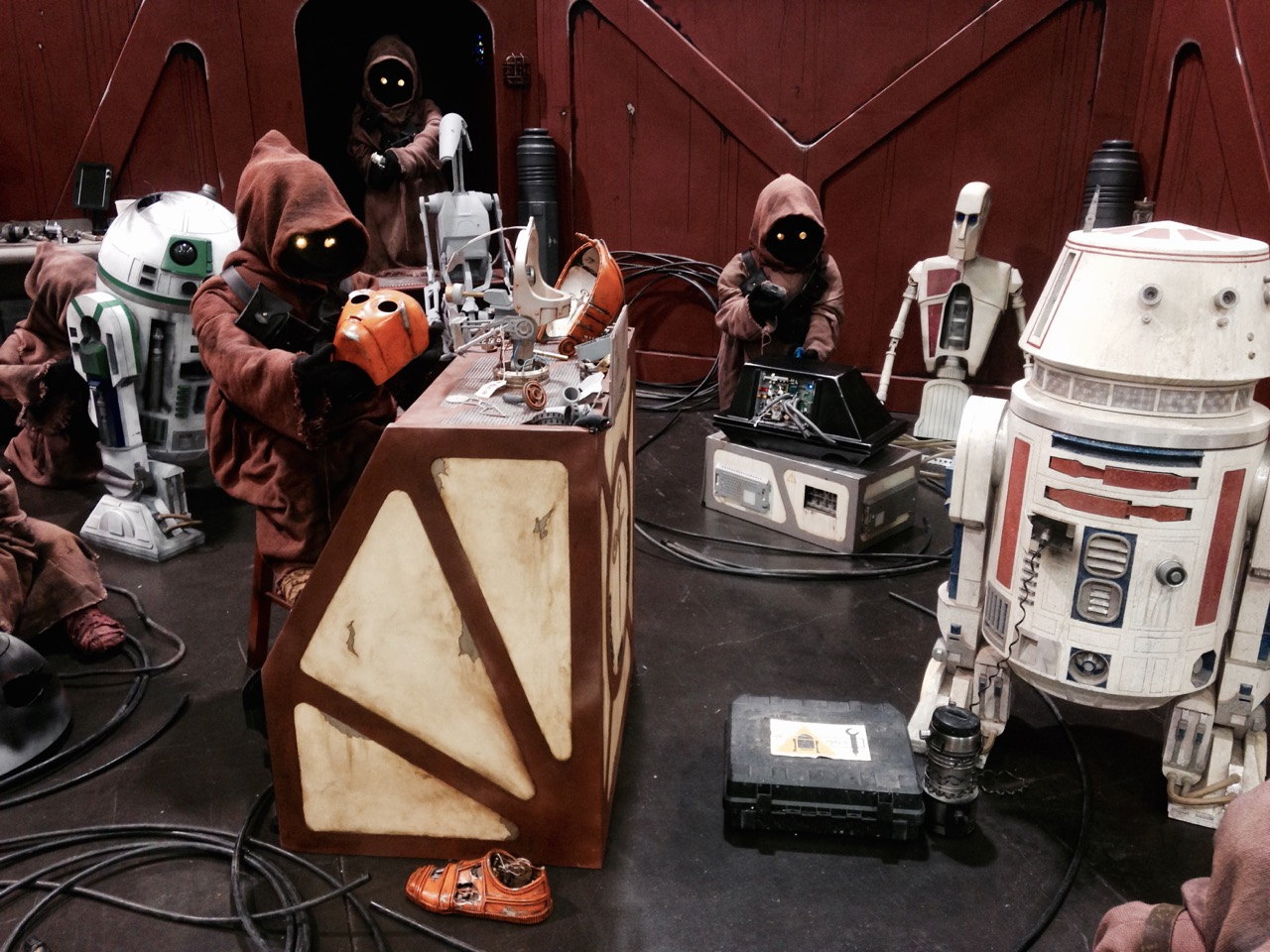
Celebration 2015: Jawas & Droids

It was announced at the closing ceremonies of Celebration Europe II that Celebration Anaheim would be held in Anaheim, California, at the Anaheim Convention Center, from April 16 to 19, 2015, with an anticipated turnout of about 50,000 fans.

This event was one of the most anticipated due to the December 2015 release of Star Wars: The Force Awakens with most news and info on the film being kept secretive prior to the event. The entire celebration was broadcast live online free via www.starwars.com and the Star Wars' YouTube channel. The long-awaited second teaser trailer for the Star Wars: The Force Awakens premiered on April 16, 2015, during the opening panel of the event which also included many of the stars of the upcoming film, new and old, director J. J. Abrams along with producer and president of Lucasfilm, Kathleen Kennedy. The following day, fans were treated to the trailer for the upcoming videogame, Star Wars: Battlefront while on the third day the trailer for the second season of Star Wars Rebels made its debut. The Celebration closed out its fourth and final day with fans being shown an exclusive teaser trailer for Rogue One, which was released in December 2016. This is the first of two anthology films, which are also known as the stand-alone or origin story films.

==== Celebration Anaheim 2022 ====
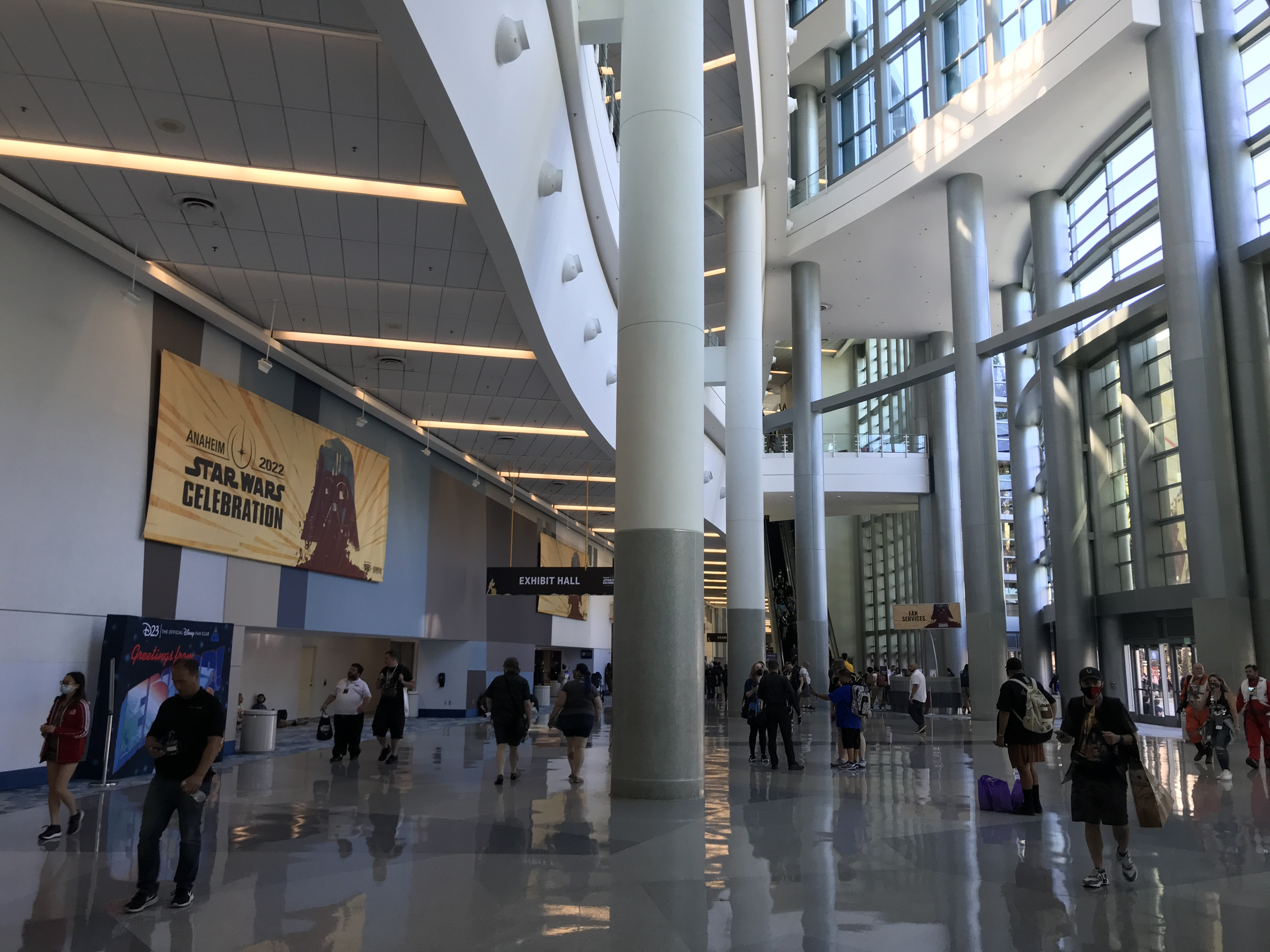
Anaheim Convention Center during SWC 2022

It was announced on April 15, 2019, the last day of Celebration Chicago 2019, that in 2020, the next Star Wars Celebration would be held for the second time at the Anaheim Convention Center in Anaheim, California. On June 15, 2020, it was announced that the 2020 Celebration had been cancelled due to the COVID-19 pandemic, with the next event scheduled to be held from August 18 to 21, 2022. The event was later moved forward by three months. Several new Disney+-exclusive Star Wars series were promoted, including Young Jedi Adventures, Tales of the Jedi, Obi-Wan Kenobi, Andor and Ahsoka.

=== Star Wars Celebration Orlando ===
==== Celebration Orlando 2017 ====
Celebration Orlando took place from April 13 to 16, 2017, in Orlando, Florida. The convention celebrated the 40th Anniversary of Star Wars: A New Hope and the upcoming film, Star Wars: The Last Jedi. This was the first Star Wars Celebration that Harrison Ford attended. He made an appearance during the opening panel celebrating the 40 years of Star Wars held on April 13 which also included other stars and people important to the franchise including Kathleen Kennedy (president of Lucasfilm) and a surprise appearance by George Lucas and John Williams with the Orlando Philharmonic Orchestra, who performed parts of the soundtrack. A special tribute to Carrie Fisher was held by Mark Hamill on Friday, April 14. A teaser trailer of Star Wars: The Last Jedi premiered on Friday, April 14. On Saturday, April 15 it was announced that season 4 of Star Wars Rebels would be the last season of the series. The celebration was once again streamed live and free via StarWars.com and the Star Wars YouTube channel.

=== Star Wars Celebration Chicago ===
==== Celebration Chicago 2019 ====
The thirteenth Star Wars Celebration was held from April 11 to 15, 2019 inside Chicago's McCormick Place. A teaser trailer and title reveal for Star Wars: The Rise of Skywalker occurred on April 12; a franchise mural including art from the upcoming film was also unveiled. A trailer for the upcoming game Star Wars Jedi: Fallen Order was also showcased as well as teaser reels for The Clone Wars Season 7 and the new Disney+ exclusive show, The Mandalorian. It was announced in June 2019 that Celebration Chicago drew an estimated 65,000 fans.

Also during Star Wars Celebration Chicago, Lucasfilm sound editor Matthew Wood teased that there would be a new Lego Star Wars game.

=== Star Wars Celebration Los Angeles ===
==== Celebration Los Angeles 2027 ====
It was announced on April 20, 2025 during the Celebration Japan 2025 closing ceremony that there would be no event in 2026. Instead the next Celebration would be held in Los Angeles in 2027. This four-day event will be held at the Los Angeles Convention Center from April 1 to 4 to commemorate the 50th anniversary of the first Star Wars film.

== Overview of events ==
Name	Date	Attendance	Venue	City	Notes
Celebration I	April 30 – May 2, 1999	20,000+	Wings Over the Rockies Air and Space Museum	Denver, Colorado, United States	Promoted Episode I – The Phantom Menace
Celebration II	May 3–5, 2002	27,000+	Indiana Convention Center	Indianapolis, Indiana, United States	Promoted Episode II – Attack of the Clones
Celebration III	April 21–24, 2005	29,000+	Indiana Convention Center	Indianapolis, Indiana, United States	Promoted Episode III – Revenge of the Sith
Celebration IV	May 24–28, 2007	35,000+	Los Angeles Convention Center	Los Angeles, California, United States	Celebrated the 30th anniversary of the first Star Wars film and franchise
Celebration Europe	July 13–15, 2007	29,000+	ExCeL Exhibition Centre	London, United Kingdom	The first event outside the US
Celebration Japan	July 19–21, 2008	17,000+	Makuhari Messe	Chiba, Japan	The first event in Asia
Celebration V	August 12–15, 2010	30,000+	Orange County Convention Center	Orlando, Florida, United States	George Lucas announced Episodes I–VI 3D re-release
Celebration VI	August 23–26, 2012	35,000+	Orange County Convention Center	Orlando, Florida, United States	—
Celebration Europe II	July 26–28, 2013	20,000+	Messe Essen	Essen, Germany	The first event under Disney
Celebration Anaheim 2015	April 16–19, 2015	50,000+	Anaheim Convention Center	Anaheim, California, United States	Promoted Episode VII – The Force Awakens and Star Wars Rebels Season 2
Celebration Europe 2016	July 15–17, 2016		ExCeL Exhibition Centre	London, United Kingdom	Promoted Rogue One: A Star Wars Story and Solo: A Star Wars Story
Celebration Orlando 2017	April 13–16, 2017	70,000+	Orange County Convention Center	Orlando, Florida, United States	Promoted Episode VIII – The Last Jedi and Star Wars Rebels Season 4; Celebrated 40th Anniversary of Episode IV - A New Hope
Celebration Chicago 2019	April 11–15, 2019	65,000+	McCormick Place	Chicago, Illinois, United States	Celebrated 20th Anniversary of Episode I release and Celebration convention; Promoted Episode IX – The Rise of Skywalker; The Mandalorian, Jedi: Fallen Order, and The Clone Wars Season 7
Celebration Anaheim 2020	August 27–30, 2020	Cancelled due to COVID-19 pandemic; first rescheduled to August; later to May 2022			
Celebration Anaheim 2022	May 26–29, 2022		Anaheim Convention Center	Anaheim, California, United States	Celebrated 20th anniversary of Episode II release; Promoted Obi-Wan Kenobi on Disney+
Celebration Europe 2023	April 7–10, 2023		ExCeL Exhibition Centre	London, United Kingdom	Promoted Andor, Ahsoka, The Acolyte and Skeleton Crew, Star Wars: Visions Season 2 and The Bad Batch Season 3 on Disney+, and Jedi: Survivor; Promoted Indiana Jones and the Dial of Destiny and three upcoming Star Wars films from Dave Filoni, James Mangold and Sharmeen Obaid-Chinoy; Celebrated 40th Anniversary of Return of the Jedi release and promoted limited theatrical re-release of Return of the Jedi from April 28 to May 4, 2023
Celebration Japan 2025	April 18–20, 2025	105,000+	Makuhari Messe	Chiba, Japan	Promoted The Mandalorian and Grogu and Star Wars: Starfighter; Promoted Ahsoka Season 2, Andor Season 2, Star Wars: Visions Season 3 and Star Wars: Maul – Shadow Lord on Disney+.; Celebrated 20th Anniversary of Revenge of the Sith release and promoted limited theatrical re-release of Revenge of the Sith
Celebration Los Angeles 2027	April 1–4, 2027		Los Angeles Convention Center	Los Angeles, California, United States	Will celebrate the 50th anniversary of the first Star Wars film and franchise
