= Thales Training & Simulation =

Manufacturing company

Thales Training & Simulation Ltd.
- Company type: Subsidiary
- Industry: Aerospace
- Founded: 1946; 80 years ago (as Redifon)
- Key people: Alex Dorrian (CEO)
- Products: Full flight simulators
- Services: Commercial aviation training, military training
- Number of employees: ~2,000
- Parent: Thales Group

Thales Training & Simulation Ltd. is a multinational company which manufactures simulators, including full flight simulators and military simulators, and provides related training and support services. It is a wholly owned subsidiary of the Thales Group.

== History ==
The origins of the company date back to the incorporation of Redifon in the United Kingdom in 1946. In 1948, the company moved to the then new town of Crawley in West Sussex. In 1981, the parent company British Electric Traction changed the company name to Rediffusion Simulation Limited (RSL) to take advantage of the then familiar Rediffusion brand name.

In 1988, the company was bought by Hughes Aircraft and renamed Hughes Rediffusion Simulation (HRSL).

In 1994, the company was taken over by the French conglomerate Thomson-CSF, who renamed it Thomson Training & Simulation (TTSL) and merged it with Link-Miles, a simulation business based in Lancing that had been acquired by Thomson-CSF in 1990. All production activities were moved to the Manor Royal industrial estate in Crawley.

Further acquisitions by Thomson-CSF in the simulation business included the American company Burtek in 1979 and the Australian simulation business of Wormald Technology in 1998. In 2000, Thomson-CSF was rebranded Thales, and TTSL's name was changed accordingly to Thales Training & Simulation.

In 2012, Thales sold its civilian fixed-wing simulation business to L-3 Communications (now L3Harris), which incorporated it into a new company: L-3 Link Simulation & Training. The purchase included part of the TTSL Crawley plant – including the full flight simulator primary design and manufacturing facilities – but Thales retained its military and rotary-wing (helicopter) simulation business. In 2023, L3Harris in turn sold on the business to TJC, which rebranded it Acron Aviation.

== Operations ==
Thales Training & Simulation has four main manufacturing plants:

- United Kingdom (Crawley, West Sussex) producing military aircraft simulators and provides training and support services for military customers.
- France (Cergy-Pontoise) responsible for the military aircraft, military helicopter and land vehicle (tanks, trucks) simulation product ranges;
- Germany (Koblenz) where the small arms trainers are manufactured;
- Australia (Sydney, New South Wales) which addresses Australasia requirements.

In addition, the company has joint ventures and/or customer support hubs in the United States, Saudi Arabia, China, etc.

== Products and services ==
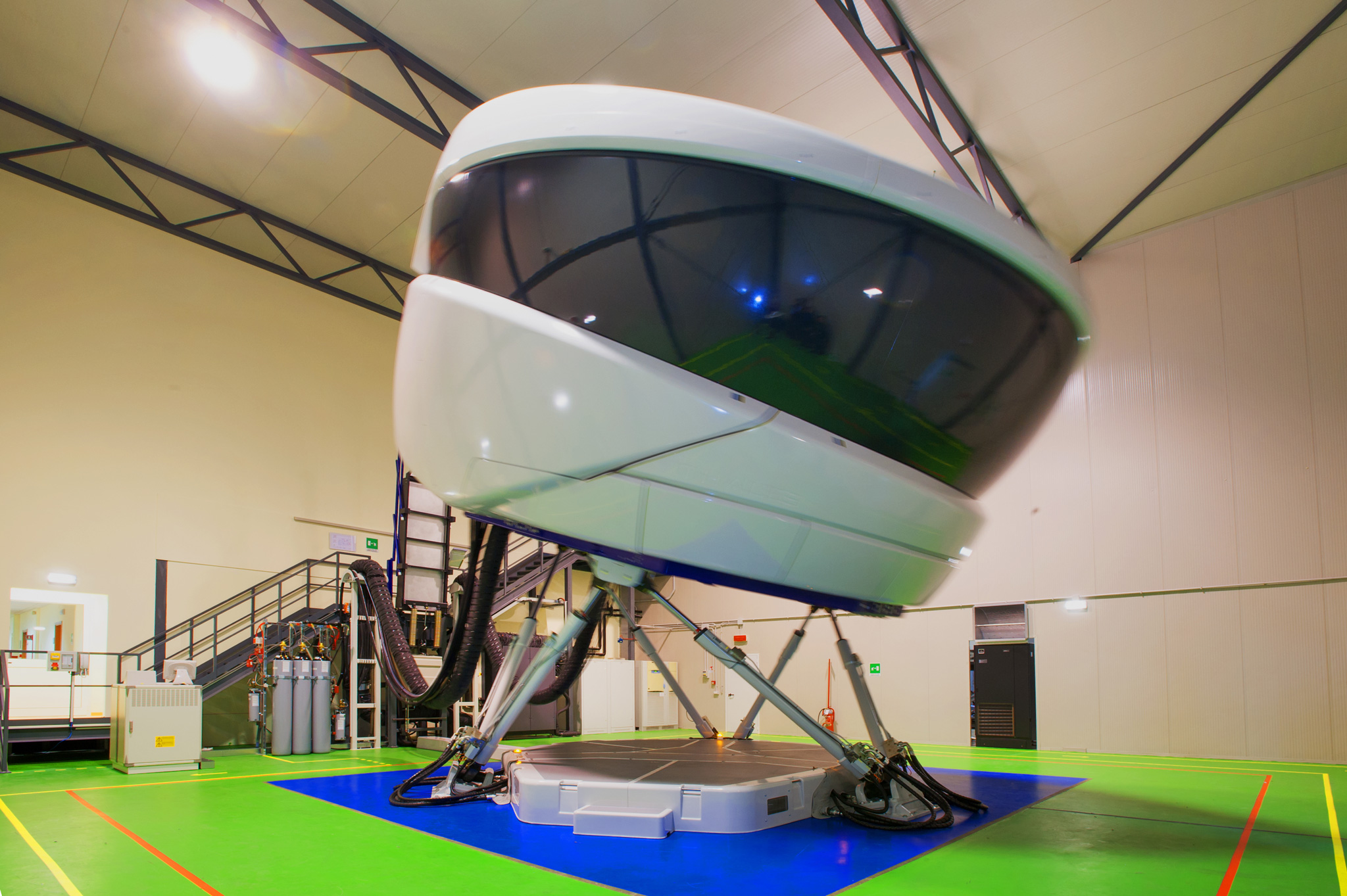
A RealitySeven full flight simulator in operation

Thales have built and now operate numerous types of aircraft simulators, including:

- Fixed base — No motion platform, normally housed in a dome, commonly military application. Full flight simulators can also be fixed base; these are generally basic training devices that have no visual and are control trainers only.
- Full flight simulators — A fully immersed simulation that has a motion platform, can be either hydraulic or electric. TTS developed the RealitySeven and Reality H lines of full flight simulators, for fixed-wing and helicopters respectively.
- Military simulators — These can simulate parts of aircraft (fuselage), water based vehicles or ground systems, they are designed to simulate the look and/or feel of the environment.
- The range of services offered in support of military simulators now extends to both PFI and PPP contracts. Thales Training & Simulation provides the Synthetic training service for Tornado GR4 Royal Air Force pilots and navigators. A similar service is provided to train Army Air Corps Lynx Mk 7 & Mk 9 pilots. A further Thales training service took over the operation of several existing Royal Air Force Simulator training centres, Nimrod MR Mk2, C130K, VC10, Tristar, Tucano, Jaguar, Tornado F3 and SeaKing Mk3, under a PPP arrangement. As the PFI model has been adopted outside the UK, Thales is also part of a consortium to supply NH90 helicopter synthetic training to the German airforce under a PFI framework. Thales Training & Simulation has a joint venture with Eurocopter running a synthetic helicopter training facility, Helisim.
- Thales collaborated with Walt Disney Imagineering back in the mid-1980s to create and develop the Advanced Technology Leisure Application Simulator (A.T.L.A.S) ride system that would eventually be used for various Disney attractions around the world, such as Star Tours, Body Wars, and Iron Man Experience.
- Thales also manufactures driver simulators for trucks (heavy goods vehicles), busses and military vehicles including tanks.
- The range of simulators extends to nuclear power plant simulators (for operator training) and small arms simulators for training army, police, etc.
