= List of Disney Adventure World attractions =

Disney Adventure World (formerly Walt Disney Studios Park) is a theme park at Disneyland Paris in Marne-la-Vallée, near Paris, France. These are the attractions found in Disney Adventure World.

== World Premiere Plaza ==
=== Current attractions and entertainment ===
- Earffel Tower
- Disney Theater
  - World Premiere
- The Twilight Zone Tower of Terror
- Studio D
  - Minnie's Dream Factory
  - Stitch Live!
- Studio Theater
  - Together: a Pixar Musical Adventure
- Animation Celebration
  - Animation Academy
  - Animation Celebration Theater
- Flying Carpets Over Agrabah
- Theater of the Stars
  - Alice & the Queen of Hearts: Back To Wonderland (Seasonal show in 2024 and 2025, and expected to reopen for Spring 2027)

=== Former attractions and entertainment ===
- Animation Celebration
  - Animation Celebration Theater
    - Frozen: A Musical Invitation
- Studio D
  - Disney Junior Dream Factory (2021–2024)
  - Minnie's Musical Moment (2024–2025)

== Worlds of Pixar ==
=== Current attractions and entertainment ===
- Cars Quatre Roues Rallye (Cars Race Rally)
- Cars: Road Trip
- Crush's Coaster
- Ratatouille: L'Aventure Totalement Toquée de Rémy (Remy's Totally Zany Adventure)
- Toy Story Playland
  - RC Racer
  - Slinky Dog Zigzag Spin
  - Toy Soldiers Parachute Drop

== Avengers Campus ==
=== Current attractions and entertainment ===
- Avengers Assemble: Flight Force
- Spider-Man WEB Adventure
- Doctor Strange: Mystery of the Mystics

== World of Frozen ==
=== Current attractions and entertainment ===
- Frozen Ever After
- A Celebration in Arendelle

== Adventure Way ==
=== Current attractions and entertainment ===
- Raiponce Tangled Spin
- Adventure Bay
  - Disney Cascade of Lights

=== Upcoming attractions and entertainment ===
- Wilderness Explorers Sky Swings (Opening in 2027)

== Upcoming Areas ==
=== Pride Lands ===
- Untitled Lion King attraction

== Former Areas ==
=== Front Lot ===
==== Former attractions and entertainment ====
- Disney Studio 1

=== Toon Studio ===
==== Former attractions and entertainment ====
- Animagique

=== Production Courtyard ===
==== Former attractions and entertainment ====
- CinéMagique
- Disney Junior - Live on Stage!
- Star Wars: A Galactic Celebration
- Studio Tram Tour: Behind the Magic

=== Backlot ===
==== Former attractions and entertainment ====
- Armageddon – Les Effets Speciaux
- Rock 'n' Roller Coaster Avec Aerosmith
- Moteurs... Action! Stunt Show Spectacular

== See also ==
- Disneyland Park (Paris)
- List of Disneyland Park (Paris) attractions
