= Worlds of Pixar =

Themed land in Disney Adventure World

- Previously known as Toon Studio
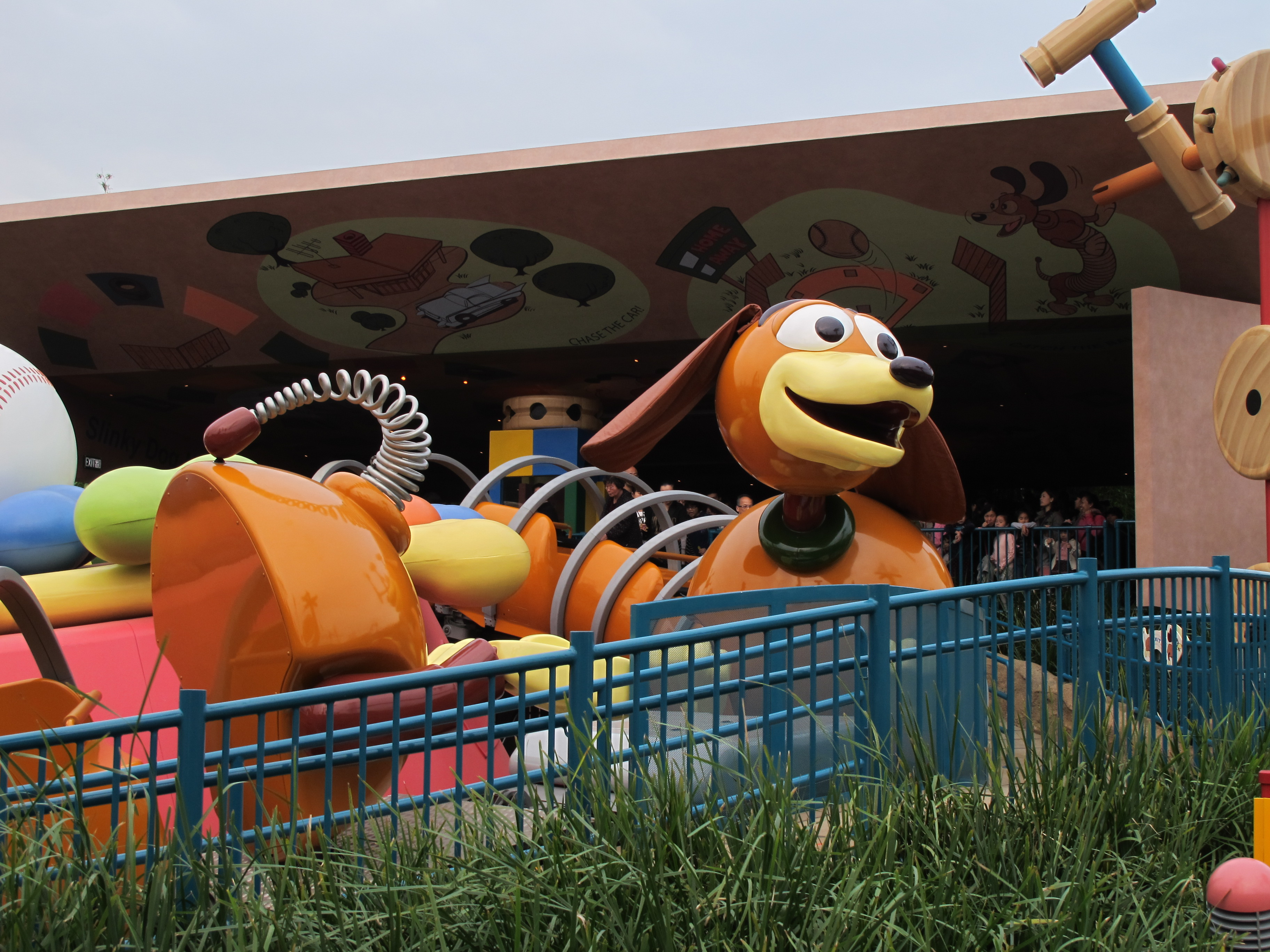
- Slinky Dog Zigzag Spin
- Location: Disneyland Paris, Marne-la-Vallée, France
- Status: Operating
- Public transit: Marne-la-Vallée–Chessy
- Owner: Disney Experiences (The Walt Disney Company)
- Theme: Pixar
- Operating season: Year-round

Attractions
- Total: 7 (as of 2025)
- Roller coasters: 2
- Replaced: Toon Studio

Worlds of Pixar is a themed land at Disney Adventure World in Disneyland Paris, France. Dedicated to stories and characters from Pixar Animation Studios, the area was officially introduced in 2021 as a rebranding of the park's existing Pixar-themed attractions and sub-areas.

Worlds of Pixar encompasses several popular rides, entertainment, and dining locations based on films such as Finding Nemo, Toy Story, Ratatouille, and Cars. It was the first of several new zones created during a multi-year expansion plan and park overhaul during the 2020s, aimed at moving the park away from its original studio-backlot theme and more towards story-centric lands.

== History ==
When Walt Disney Studios Park opened in 2002, its animation-themed zone (then named Animation Courtyard) did not yet have a unified Pixar land, but this evolved over time. In June 2007, the park debuted its first two Pixar attractions as part of a major expansion and renaming of the animation area to "Toon Studio". This expansion introduced Crush's Coaster, a spinning indoor roller coaster themed to Finding Nemo, and Cars Quatre Roues Rallye, a Cars-themed spinning ride set at a Radiator Springs service station. Both attractions opened on 9 June 2007 and were exclusive to Disneyland Paris at the time.

Ratatouille: L'Aventure Totalement Toquée de Rémy (Remy's Ratatouille Adventure)

The Pixar presence grew further in the following years. In August 2010, a new sub-area called Toy Story Playland opened, becoming the first Toy Story-themed land at any Disney park. Here, visitors appear to "shrink" to the scale of a toy through oversized theming throughout the area. It features three family attractions, RC Racer, Toy Soldiers Parachute Drop, and Slinky Dog Zigzag Spin, all opened in 2010 to coincide with the release of Toy Story 3. In 2014, another expansion introduced a Parisian-themed area based on Ratatouille, including the trackless dark ride Ratatouille: L'Aventure Totalement Toquée de Rémy (in English: Ratatouille: The Adventure). Adjacent to the Ratatouille ride is Bistrot Chez Rémy, a table-service restaurant where guests dine among oversized props from the film. These additions gradually formed a cluster of Pixar attractions within the Toon Studio land.

In February 2018, Disney CEO Bob Iger announced a €2 billion expansion plan for Walt Disney Studios Park, marking a shift towards immersive franchise-based lands. The plan included new areas for Marvel, Frozen, and Star Wars as well as a large artificial central lake for shows. As part of this transformation, the park's original Studio Tram Tour: Behind the Magic ride was closed in January 2020. It was reimagined with a Pixar theme and reopened on 17 June 2021 as Cars: Road Trip, a guided tram tour along a Route 66-inspired route featuring characters and scenes from Cars.

In late August 2021, Disneyland Paris officially announced that a substantial portion of Toon Studio, encompassing all Pixar-themed rides and experienced, would be renamed to Worlds of Pixar, creating a single themed area dedicated to Pixar storytelling. This change formed part of the park’s wider strategy to increase thematic coherence and immersion by moving away from the original studio lot concept in favour of lands based on individual franchises. The remaining non-Pixar attractions, including Animagique Theater, Animation Celebration, and Flying Carpets Over Agrabah, were retained as part of a smaller adjacent zone now known as "World Premiere Plaza".

When World of Frozen is opened on 29 March 2026, Walt Disney Studios Park was set renamed Disney Adventure World, reflecting its new focus on immersive lands. As one of the core lands situated at the front of the park, Worlds of Pixar connects to the Frozen area via a lakeside promenade accessible through Toy Story Playland.

== Sub-areas ==
Worlds of Pixar contains multiple sub-areas which offer several attractions, dining, and shopping options themed to a certain film or franchise. In addition to these, Worlds of Pixar offers meet-and-greet opportunities with Pixar characters. Appearances have included characters such as Buzz Lightyear, Woody and Jessie, the Incredibles, and Lightning McQueen, who greet guests or roam the land for photo opportunities.

=== Finding Nemo ===
Name	Opened	Description
Crush's Coaster	2007	A spinning roller coaster themed after Finding Nemo, where Crush invites them to climb aboard sea turtle shells for a ride through memorable scenes from the film.

=== Toy Story Playland ===
Name	Opened	Description
RC Racer	2010	A steel shuttle roller coaster themed after Hot Wheels where guests ride on a 25-meter half-pipe in a ride vehicle themed after the RC character from the Toy Story franchise.
Slinky Dog Zigzag Spin	2010	A Caterpillar-style ride themed after the Slinky Dog character trying to grab his tail.
Toy Soldiers Parachute Drop	2010	A parachute jump-style drop tower where guests test their parachute-floating skills with Sarge and the Bucket O Soldiers.
Toy Story Playland Boutique	2010	A store selling Toy Story merchandise set within a Barrel of Monkeys container.

=== Ratatouille ===
Name	Opened	Description
Ratatouille: L'Aventure Totalement Toquée de Rémy	2014	A motion-based trackless dark ride based on the film.
Bistrot Chez Rémy	2014	A table-service restaurant serving French cuisine whilst guests dine among oversized props to give the illusion that they have shrunk to "rat-size".
Chez Marianne (Souvenirs de Paris)	2014	An art-deco boutique selling Disney merchandise and French candy.

=== Cars ===
Name	Opened	Description
Cars Quatre Roues Rallye	2007	A Zamperla spinning ride at a Radiator Springs service station. The ride vehicles are located on four spinning plateaus.
Cars: Road Trip	2021	An abridged version of the defunct Studio Tram Tour: Behind the Magic themed to the Cars franchise. This attraction utilises a part of the track and the "Catastrophe Canyon" portion of the former ride.
Laugh'N' Go!	2021	A food truck serving cheese-based products from The Laughing Cow.

== See also ==
- Front Lot
- Avengers Campus
- Pixar Pier
