= Animation Academy =

Attraction type at Disney theme parks

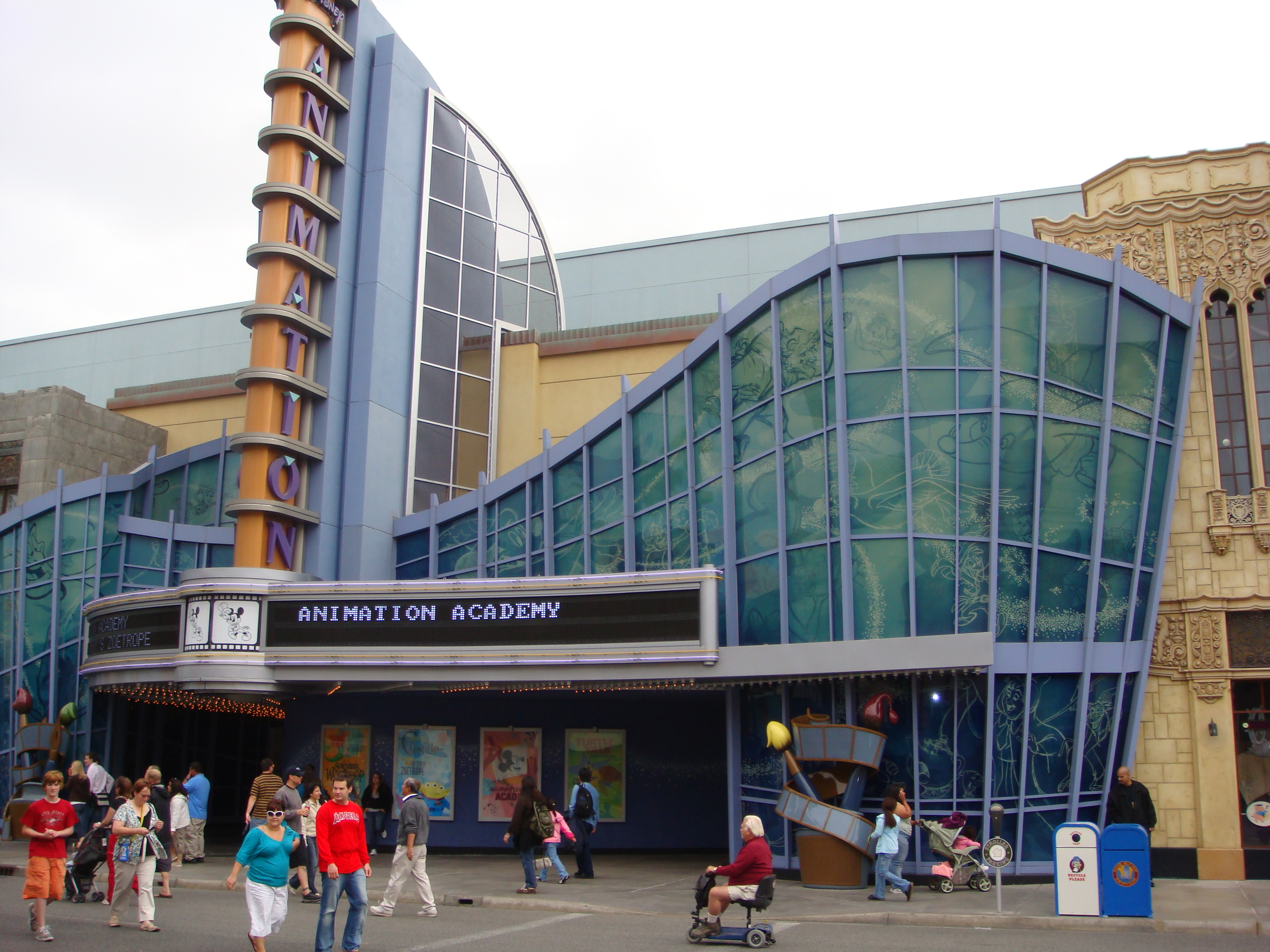
- Disney Animation building at Disney California Adventure in 2008.

Disney's Hollywood Studios
- Name: Olaf Draws! (2026–present)
- Area: Animation Courtyard (The Magic of Disney Animation) (1989–2015); Walt Disney Studios (The Magic of Disney Animation) (2026–present)
- Status: Operating
- Soft opening date: September 9, 2026 (Olaf Draws!)
- Opening date: May 1, 1989 (Original); September 14, 2026 (Olaf Draws!)
- Closing date: July 12, 2015 (Original)
- Replaced: Star Wars Launch Bay (Animation Courtyard)
- Replaced by: Star Wars Launch Bay (Animation Courtyard)

Tokyo Disneyland
- Name: Disney Drawing Class
- Area: World Bazzar (The Disney Gallery)
- Status: Closed
- Opening date: 1994
- Closing date: September 30, 2016
- Replaced by: Bibbidi Bobbidi Boutique

DisneyQuest
- Status: Closed
- Opening date: June 9, 1998
- Closing date: July 3, 2017

Disney California Adventure
- Area: Hollywood Land (Disney Animation)
- Status: Operating
- Opening date: February 8, 2001

Disney Adventure World
- Area: Toon Studio (2002–2025); World Premiere Plaza (2025–present)
- Status: Operating
- Opening date: March 16, 2002

Hong Kong Disneyland
- Area: Main Street, U.S.A.
- Status: Operating
- Opening date: July 14, 2007

Shanghai Disneyland
- Name: Marvel Comic Academy
- Area: Gardens of Imagination
- Status: Operating
- Opening date: June 16, 2016

Disney's Animal Kingdom
- Name: The Animation Experience at Conservation Station
- Area: Rafiki's Planet Watch
- Status: Removed
- Opening date: July 11, 2019
- Closing date: February 23, 2026
- Replaced: Portion of Conversation Station
- Replaced by: Bluey's Wild World

Ride statistics
- Attraction type: Drawing class
- Theme: Disney Animation; Marvel Comics (Shanghai)
- Duration: 25–30 minutes
- Attraction host: Olaf (Orlando: 2026–present)
- Audio-Animatronics: 1 (Olaf Draws!)

Animation Academy is an attraction at Disney's Hollywood Studios, Disney California Adventure, Disney Adventure World, and Hong Kong Disneyland. In Shanghai Disneyland, the attraction is called Marvel Comic Academy, which features drawing Marvel Comics characters instead of Disney characters. The Animation Academy is also offered aboard all Disney Cruise Line ships, as part of their daily activities, as well as during Epcot's Festival of the Arts.

At Walt Disney World, the attraction formerly existed in DisneyQuest, located at Disney Springs which closed in 2017, and a similar attraction called The Animation Experience operated at Disney's Animal Kingdom's Conservation Station, which closed in 2026. Tokyo Disneyland also featured an almost identical attraction within The Disney Gallery in World Bazaar, named Disney Drawing Class, which closed on September 30, 2016.

== History ==
=== Disney's Animal Kingdom ===
At Disney's Animal Kingdom, The Animation Experience at Conservation Station (the second iteration of the attraction at the park) was being reopened within Rafiki's Planet Watch on July 11, 2019, and its drawing classes feature popular Disney animal characters, since it was announced that the first renovations of the attraction was being temporarily closed on October 21, 2018. On February 3, 2026, it was announced that the attraction was permanently closed on February 23, 2026 to make way for a new Bluey experience as Bluey's Wild World at Disney's Animal Kingdom on May 26, 2026 and move to the Magic of Disney Animation at Disney's Hollywood Studios.

=== Disneyland Paris ===
In 2025, Animation Celebration was located in Toon Studio, but was re-designated to World Premiere Plaza on March 29, 2026, which is the date on which Walt Disney Studios Park will be renamed Disney Adventure World at Disneyland Paris. On February 17, 2026, it was announced the final performance of the show as Frozen: A Musical Invitation in the Animation Celebration theater, will permanently closed on April 1, 2026, which is the date after Disney Adventure World at Disneyland Paris, since it was announced that the first renovations of the ride as Art of Disney Animation was being temporarily closed on January 7, 2019 until the second renovations of the attraction was reopened on November 17, 2019 as Animation Celebration, including the interactive show and meet and greets, for over six years ago.

=== Disney's Hollywood Studios ===
Attraction logo of Olaf Draws! at Disney's Hollywood Studios.

In February 2026, it was announced that the Animation Academy will be renamed Olaf Draws! featuring an Audio-Animatronic figure of Olaf in The Magic of Disney Animation, which was opened on September 14, 2026.

== Summary ==
The attraction opened together with DisneyQuest at Walt Disney World in 1998. It was also added to Disney's Hollywood Studios and Disney California Adventure. It can be found within Art of Disney Animation at Walt Disney Studios Park. The attraction opened at Hong Kong Disneyland on July 14, 2007, and is located adjacent to the Opera House in Main Street, U.S.A.

The attraction itself is a drawing session with a Disney Cast Member who teaches guests to draw a character from Disney's animated films. Guests may take their own artwork home if they want after the drawing session.
