= Monkeys (Chair) =

Sculpture by Jeff Koons

- Artist: Jeff Koons
- Year: 2002
- Medium: Polychromed aluminium
- Subject: Three monkeys
- Dimensions: 280 cm × 58 cm × 66 cm (112 in × 23 in × 26 in)
- Accession: Collection Uli Knecht

Monkeys (Chair) is a sculpture by the American artist Jeff Koons (112 x 23 x 26 in). It was made in 2002 within the framework of the Popeye Series and is now in possession of the Collection Uli Knecht.

== Description ==
The sculpture is a somewhat surreal combination of everyday objects. Three monkeys, which resemble very much inflatable children's toys, are connected together. They form a chain that dangles from the ceiling. A white straw chair is attached at the lowest end of the chain. The sculpture illustrates Jeff Koon's fascination for children's toys which becomes particularly evident in the Popeye Series for which Koons sought inspiration in floating aids in the shape of animals. The monkeys that feature in the sculpture remind of the game Barrel of Monkeys in which the players have to gain the hook-tailed monkeys in a chain. Monkeys (Chair) is an example of Koons's strategy of mashing up ideas and methods of Pop, Conceptual, and appropriation art with handicraft and popular culture.

== Technique ==
The monkey figures are made of polychromed aluminium. Real plastic toys served as a template for the execution of this work of art. The shiny surface of the metal helps creating a perfect illusion. The transfer into another material creates new static conditions which allow the attachment of the chair at the lowest end of the chain.

== Effect ==
In this work Jeff Koons plays with different material perceptions. The monkeys seem to be made of plastic, but this impression contradicts the sculpture's static properties. If the chain of monkeys was made of inflatable toys, it could not support the heavy weight of the chair. The spectator's only possibility to resolve this contradictory perception is to take a look at the artwork's label.

== Bibliography ==
- Vinzenz Brinkmann: Jeff Koons – The Sculptor. Exh.Cat. "Jeff Koons, the Painter & the Sculptor", Liebighaus Skulpturensammlung, Schirn Kunsthalle Frankfurt, 20. June - 23. September 2012, Ostfildern 2012, p. 109.
