= Cars: Road Trip =

Attraction at Walt Disney Studios Park

Disney Adventure World
- Area: Worlds of Pixar
- Status: Operating
- Opening date: June 17, 2021
- Replaced: Studio Tram Tour: Behind the Magic (Production Courtyard)

Ride statistics
- Attraction type: Tram tour
- Designer: Walt Disney Imagineering, Pixar Animation Studios
- Theme: Cars, Route 66 road trip
- Vehicle type: Trackless tram
- Duration: 7:00
- Wheelchair accessible

Cars: Road Trip is a tram-style attraction at Disney Adventure World in Disneyland Paris. The ride is based on Disney Pixar’s Cars film franchise and takes guests on a simulated road trip along the famous Route 66 highway, featuring life-sized characters and scenic roadside attractions.

It opened on June 17, 2021, as a reimagining of the former Studio Tram Tour: Behind the Magic, which had closed in 2020 to make way for a park expansion. Originally announced as “Cars: Route 66 Road Trip”, the attraction was later renamed Cars: Road Trip and was designed by Walt Disney Imagineering in collaboration with Pixar Animation Studios.

== History ==
Cars: Road Trip was developed as part of a major expansion of Walt Disney Studios Park announced in 2018, which outlined plans for new themed areas based on Marvel, Frozen, and Star Wars, centred around a large artificial lake. To facilitate this transformation, substantial portions of the existing park were reconfigured, including the partial demolition of Studio Tram Tour: Behind the Magic. On 14 October 2019, Disneyland Paris announced that the tram tour would be replaced by a new attraction based on Pixar's Cars franchise. While most of the former ride was dismantled, the large-scale Catastrophe Canyon effects sequence was retained and incorporated into the new concept.

Initially titled Cars: Route 66 Road Trip, the reimagined attraction was designed to reuse the original tram system and sections of the route, enhanced with updated theming, character-driven scenes, and a new storyline. The redesign was led by Walt Disney Imagineering, with Tom Fitzgerald as Creative Director and Beth Clapperton as Art Director.

Studio Tram Tour: Behind the Magic closed permanently on 5 January 2020. Construction for Cars: Road Trip included a new boarding station built outside the original footprint, accessible via a newly constructed pathway from Toy Story Playland, and alterations to the ride path to accommodate ongoing expansion works. Although the attraction was initially planned to open in summer 2020, its debut was delayed due to the COVID-19 pandemic and the temporary closure of Disneyland Paris. On 12 April 2021, park officials confirmed that the ride would open alongside the resort’s post-lockdown reopening. Cars: Road Trip officially premiered on 17 June 2021, coinciding with the resort's 29th anniversary. By that time, the attraction’s name had been shortened, dropping the "Route 66" subtitle used during development.

The attraction is positioned as a transitional experience between existing Pixar-themed areas and future expansion zones. Its entrance is located along a newly built pathway that will eventually connect Toy Story Playland to the forthcoming World of Frozen area, reinforcing its role within the broader Worlds of Pixar (previously known as Toon Studio) sub-area.

== Attraction ==
=== Design and theming ===
Cars: Road Trip is themed as a roadside attraction-style tour on Route 66, reinterpreted through the lens of the Cars universe. The design draws inspiration from real-world elements such as oversized novelty props, desert-inspired landscaping, and pun-laden signage. Walt Disney Imagineering worked in collaboration with Pixar to ensure that the humour, tone, and visual language of the Cars films were integrated throughout the attraction. The colour palette and architectural motifs aim to reflect the environment of Radiator Springs, though on a smaller and more restrained scale than Cars Land at Disney California Adventure.

The ride's route was built along a reconfigured portion of the former Studio Tram Tour with updated landscaping, including new trees and stylised vegetation intended to evoke a desert highway environment. However, much of the route still passes through areas that were previously part of the park's backlot, resulting in views of unthemed woodland or backstage zones. To address this, designers added large-scale thematic elements to enhance immersion and maintain continuity with the concept.

==== Boarding station and queue ====
The boarding station and queue design incorporates a blend of mid-century modern and Cars-themed styles to evoke the atmosphere of a classic American road trip. The new boarding station was built slightly to the west of the original tram tour load area and features an open-sided, angular roof structure reminiscent of a retro roadside motel or service station. The station includes a tourist information booth at its entrance, decorated with road maps, postcards, and other vintage travel. These details set the scene for guests as if they are starting out at a Route 66 rest area or visitor centre, which ties into the road trip narrative.

==== Vehicles ====
Guests board open-air, trackless tram vehicles, repurposed from the former Studio Tram Tour attraction. Each tram consists of multiple cars and has an onboard sound system that plays pre-recorded narration from the characters Cruz Ramirez (in English) and Sally Carrera (in French).

=== Ride layout ===
The ride begins at the attraction's loading station, where riders board the trackless trams. Shortly after departure, the tram approaches its first sightseeing stop: the "World’s Largest Lugnut", a giant novelty lug nut on display resembling a roadside attraction, similar to the "Roadside Giants" found during road trips in the United States or the "Big Things" in Australia. At this spot, stationary figures of Lightning McQueen, accompanied by Luigi and Guido, are positioned as if taking a photo in front of the lug nut.

Continuing along the route, the tram passes various billboards and signs referencing fictional attractions (such as the "Ghost Garage" and "Copper Canyon Traffic Maze"). The tour then reaches its second stop, the marquee show scene known as Cars-tastrophe Canyon. In this scene, an updated version of the former Catastrophe Canyon, the tram enters a desert canyon setting where an enormous Dinoco oil tanker truck is parked amid rocky cliffs. Without warning, an orchestrated "natural disaster" sequence is triggered: the tram begins to shake (simulating an earthquake) and pyrotechnic flames erupt around the tanker truck. Suddenly, the canyon’s walls release a torrent of water, extinguishing the flames and creating a flash flood that drenches the surrounding scenery and jolts the tram (leaving guests misted). In the story overlay, the scene is described as a "natural car wash", suggesting that the Dinoco tanker is getting an extreme shower as part of its cleaning routine. After the flood subsides, the tram and its passengers "escape" Cars-tastrophe Canyon and continue down the road.

Finally, the tram approaches the third and final stop on the tour, which showcases Mater's "Mater-piece", a tongue-in-cheek art installation created by the tow truck character. In this finale scene, Mater presents his latest artistic creation to visitors. The sculpture is a spoof of the Eiffel Tower made of fuel drums and engine parts, dubbed the "Eiffuel Tower". Fillmore can also be seen in this same area. With that last sight, the tour trams return to the station as the narration wraps up the journey. In total, the ride experience lasts approximately 7 minutes, comprising three staged scenes with gentle drive-by transit in between.

== See also ==
- Cars Quatre Roues Rallye
- Radiator Springs Racers
