= Studio Tour (disambiguation) =

Studio Tour may refer to one of the following:

- Hollywood Pictures Backlot Tour, an attraction in Hollywood Land at Disney California Adventure at Disneyland in Anaheim, California
- Studio Tour, an attraction at Universal Studios Hollywood
- Warner Bros. Studio Tour Hollywood, an attraction at Warner Bros. Movie World U.S.A. in Los Angeles, California
- Warner Bros. Studio Tour London - The Making of Harry Potter, an attraction in Leavesden, England
- Studio Backlot Tour, a former attraction at Walt Disney World, Florida
- Production Studio Tour (Universal Studios Florida), a former attraction at Universal Studios Florida
- Studio Tram Tour: Behind the Magic, a former attraction at Disneyland Paris
