= Disney Animation (disambiguation) =

Disney Animation normally refers to the Walt Disney Animation Studios. It may also refer to:

- Art of Disney Animation, attraction at some Disney parks
- Disney Animation: The Illusion of Life, a book on the history of Disney animation
- Disney Television Animation, American animation production company
- The Magic of Disney Animation, a show and tour at Walt Disney World, Florida
