= Theater of the Stars =

Theater of the Stars may refer to:

- An attraction at Disney's Hollywood Studios
- An attraction at Disney Adventure World in Disneyland Paris
- Theater of the Stars: a novel of physics and memory, 2003 novel by N. M. Kelby
