= Toon Studio =

Former area in Walt Disney Studios Park

Attractions
- Total: 8
- Roller coasters: 2
- Other rides: 6

Disney Adventure World
- Status: Defunct
- Opened: 9 June 2007
- Closed: 14 May 2025
- Replaced by: World Premiere Plaza & Worlds of Pixar

Toon Studio is a land at Disney Adventure World in Disneyland Paris, France.

The land, formerly known as Animation Courtyard, received a revamp in 2007 to features a more colourful and "immersive" theming. In August 2021, much of the land's Pixar attractions were rebranded under a new sub-area referred to as Worlds of Pixar.

Developed by Walt Disney Imagineering, the new land was announced on January 11, 2005, by Euro Disney SCA, the owner and operator of Disneyland Resort Paris, as part of a new initiative to add new attractions to both theme parks made possible by a major financial restructuring. The new creative director for Walt Disney Imagineering, John Lasseter, has made it clear he is reviewing all concepts for attractions that have been definitely commissioned, and in particular the Toon Studio is an area he wants to expand upon.

The Toon Studio concept is a spin-off of the Mickey's Toontown idea. Mickey's Toontown is an area currently at two other Disney theme parks where guests can experience the living environments of Disney characters, whereas the Walt Disney Studios is being publicised as where the Disney characters go to work, producing their animated films themselves using conventional movie-making equipment.

In April 2024, following the announcement, it was announced that Production Courtyard and Toon Studio will temporarily close, and be rebranded into new 'Themed-lands' in World Premiere Plaza, which opened May 15, 2025.

== Former Attractions and entertainment ==
=== Current ===
- Animation Celebration (as redesigned to "World Premiere Plaza")
- Flying Carpets Over Agrabah — a spinner ride similar to Dumbo the Flying Elephant where riders sit in magic carpets and act as extras in Genie’s directorial debut. The attraction is set against a large “movie set” backdrop of Agrabah. (as redesigned to "World Premiere Plaza")
- Animagique Theatre (as redesigned to "World Premiere Plaza")
  - Mickey and the Magician — a live show based on Disney animated films. (as redesigned to "World Premiere Plaza")

=== Worlds of Pixar area ===
- Crush's Coaster — a spinning roller coaster where guests enter the beached sound stage and film set of Finding Nemo, where Crush invites them to climb aboard sea turtle shells for a ride through memorable scenes from the movie. This is a unique attraction to Walt Disney Studios Park.
- Cars Quatre Roues Rallye — a Zamperla Demolition Derby attraction where guests are spin at a Radiator Spring’s car service station. Their cars are located on four spinning plateaus and they change from one spinning plateau to the next.
- Cars: Road Trip
- Ratatouille: L'Aventure Totalement Toquée de Rémy
- Toy Story Playland
  - RC Racer
  - Slinky Dog Zigzag Spin
  - Toy Soldiers Parachute Drop
- Studio 3
  - Animagique (2002-2016)
- Art of Disney Animation (2002-2019)
- Monsters Inc. Scream Academy

== Former Restaurants ==
- Toon Studio Catering Co.

=== Worlds of Pixar area ===
- Jessie's Snack Roundup
- Bistrot Chez Rémy

== Former Shops ==
- The Disney Animation Gallery (as redesigned to "World Premiere Plaza")
- Animagique Kiosk (as redesigned to "World Premiere Plaza")

=== Worlds of Pixar area ===
- Chez Marianne, Souvenirs de Paris
