= Frozen Ever After =

Disney Attraction based on Frozen

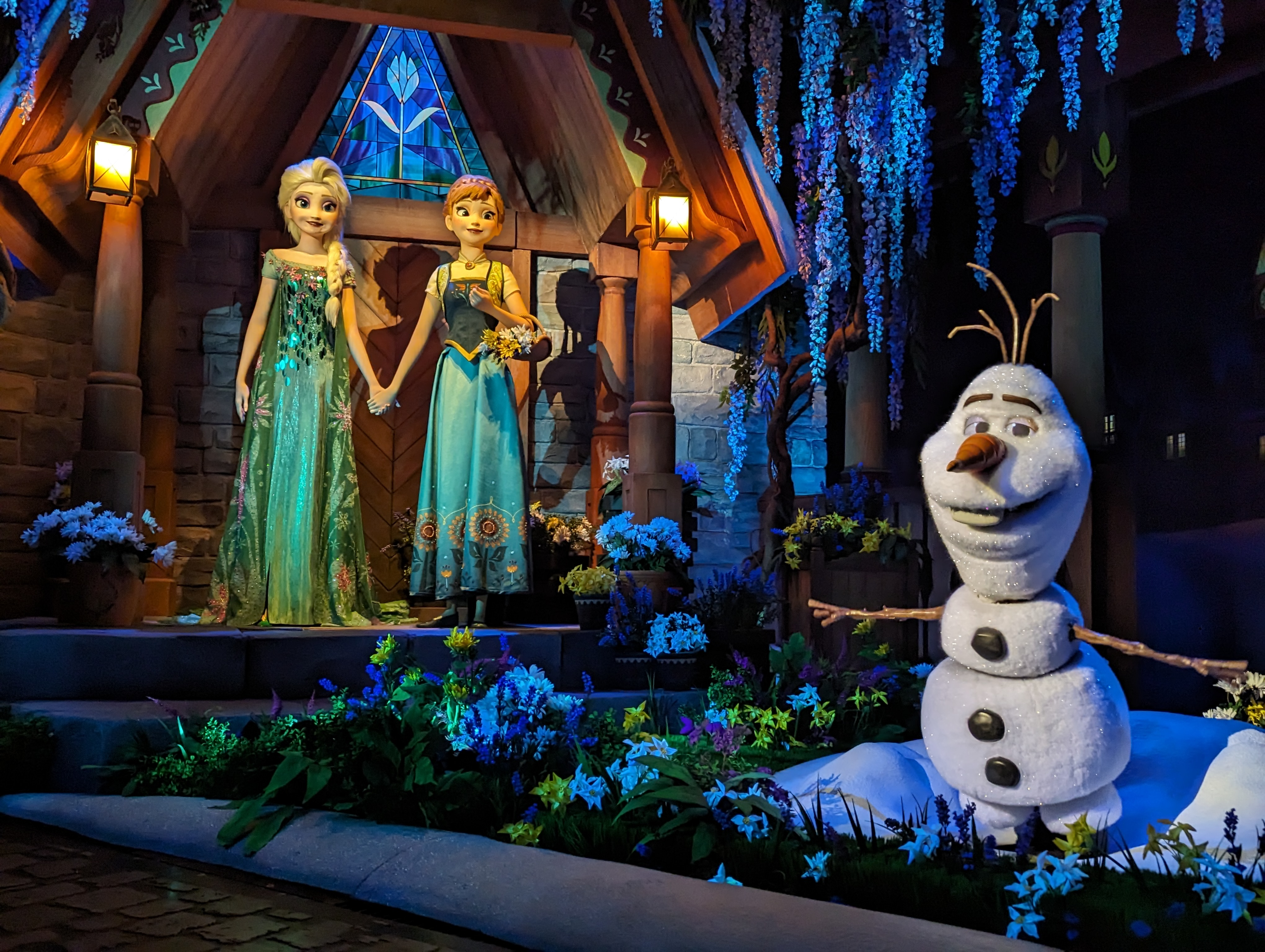
- The attraction's finale at Hong Kong Disneyland

Epcot
- Area: World Showcase, Norway pavilion
- Coordinates: 28°22′15″N 81°32′47″W
- Status: Operating
- Opening date: June 21, 2016
- Replaced: Maelstrom
- Lightning Lane available

Hong Kong Disneyland
- Area: World of Frozen
- Status: Operating
- Opening date: November 20, 2023
- Disney Premier Access available

Tokyo DisneySea
- Name: Anna and Elsa's Frozen Journey
- Area: Fantasy Springs
- Status: Operating
- Opening date: June 6, 2024
- Disney Premier Access available

Disney Adventure World
- Area: World of Frozen
- Status: Operating
- Opening date: March 29, 2026
- Disney Premier Access available

Ride statistics
- Attraction type: Reversing Shoot the Chute/Dark ride
- Manufacturer: Intamin
- Designer: Walt Disney Imagineering
- Model: Dark Boat Ride
- Theme: Frozen; Frozen Fever
- Music: Kristen Anderson-Lopez (music and lyrics), Robert Lopez (music and lyrics) & Christophe Beck (score)
- Drop: 28 ft (8.5 m)
- Length: 964 ft (294 m)
- Capacity: 1000 riders per hour
- Vehicle type: Viking Boat
- Riders per vehicle: 16
- Rows: 4
- Riders per row: 4 + lapsitters
- Duration: 5:00
- Lift count: 1
- Number of drops: 2
- Must transfer from wheelchair
- Assistive listening available

Frozen Ever After and Anna and Elsa's Frozen Journey are musical reversing Shoot the Chute dark rides at Epcot, Hong Kong Disneyland, Tokyo DisneySea, and Disney Adventure World. The attractions feature scenes inspired by Disney Animation's 2013 film Frozen and 2015 short Frozen Fever. Its first installation in Epcot opened on June 21, 2016, using the ride vehicles and track layout of the former Maelstrom attraction. A version of the attraction opened at Hong Kong Disneyland on November 20, 2023 and Tokyo DisneySea on June 6, 2024 and Disney Adventure World on March 29, 2026.

== History ==
In September 2014, Walt Disney World officials announced that the Maelstrom attraction in the Norway Pavilion of the Epcot's World Showcase section would be replaced by an attraction based on Frozen. Maelstrom's final day of operation was October 5, 2014.

In June 2015, then-Disney Chief Operating Officer Tom Staggs revealed that plans for a Frozen attraction were discussed prior to the film's release, but were accelerated after the film's worldwide success. On responding to whether converting a portion of the Norway pavilion into an attraction based on a fictional place was appropriate for World Showcase, Staggs stated: "If the goal is to give people a taste of something like Scandinavia with the Norway pavilion, then Frozen would only increase the extent to which people would be drawn to it. To me it doesn't seem out-of-character at all."

Disney also released the first details on the new attraction and revealed its final name, "Frozen Ever After." The attraction uses the same ride vehicles and course that was used for Maelstrom. The Audio-Animatronic figures for the attraction feature improvements in facial animation that were first used on the Seven Dwarfs Mine Train, which opened in 2014 at the Magic Kingdom. The Audio-Animatronics are also the first ever all-electric Audio-Animatronics, with previous Audio-Animatronics using either pneumatics or hydraulics. While there are no new songs in the attraction, some of the original songs from Frozen have revised lyrics written by the original composers.

In May 2016, Disney Parks revealed that the attraction would open June 21 that year. On opening day, the wait times were over five hours long, as the lines started in the China Pavilion. Epcot employees gave out ice cream and water bottles to guests in order to cool off in the hot sun.

In October 2025, it was announced that the attraction at Epcot would receive upgrades to its 3 Audio-Animatronics figures of Elsa, Anna and Kristoff, using updated technology currently in use in the newer World of Frozen attraction at Hong Kong Disneyland. The updates debuted on February 12, 2026.

== Ride experience ==
=== EPCOT, Hong Kong Disneyland and Disney Adventure World version ===
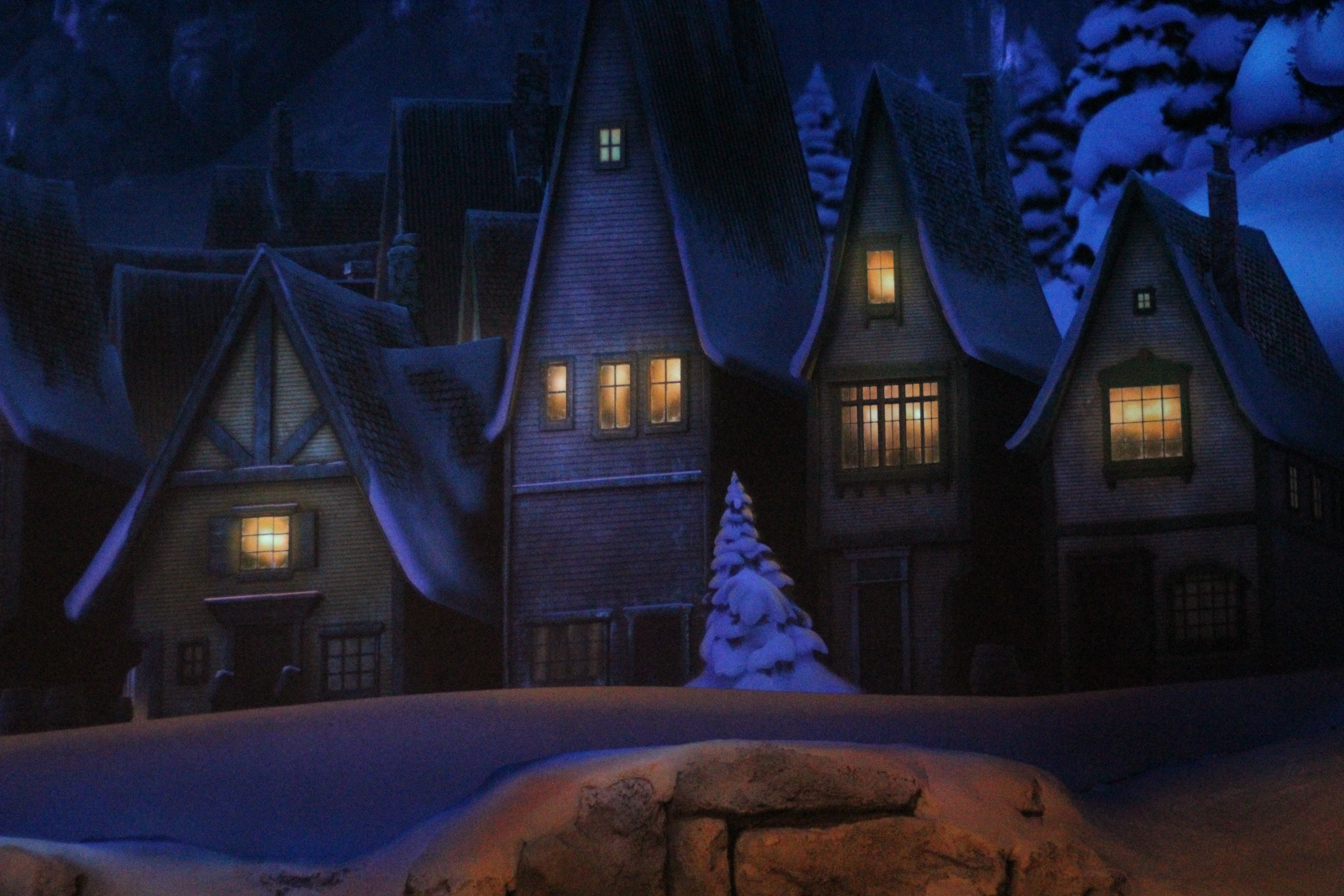
A scene from the ride

The Frozen Ever After ride commemorates the anniversary of the day Anna saved her sister, Elsa, from an attempted assassination with an unselfish act of true love, thus thawing a frozen heart and ending the eternal winter. To celebrate the event, Elsa bestowed an "Official Summer Snow Day" upon the Arendelle citizenry, inspiring the amusement ride.

Advertisements promoting the winter festival are visible to guests as they queue for the ride. Guests travel through Wandering Oaken's Trading Post and Sauna, where they find Oaken in the sauna waving to them. Guests next board a boat and sail off into a winter wonderland, where they encounter Olaf and Sven greeting guests with a rendition of "Do You Want to Build a Snowman?". Guests then pass Grand Pabbie as he recounts the story of the film to a group of young trolls.

Guests next ascend a lift towards Elsa's ice palace. When they reach the top, they find Olaf ice skating and singing "For the First Time in Forever", failing comically with the lyrics. Guests soon pass Anna and Kristoff, while Sven sits on the side with his tongue stuck to a pole. Two gates open and guests see Elsa, who is singing "Let It Go" while conjuring ice. The boats and guests then accelerate backwards down a small dip, passing images of Elsa creating the ice palace.

Guests next encounter Marshmallow and the Snowgies from Frozen Fever. The boat moves forward as Marshmallow spits out mist, passing through the mist, and down a short drop, at which an on-ride photo is taken. Riders then pass Arendelle Castle with fireworks bursting over top. Lastly, guests reach Elsa, Anna and Olaf, who are singing "In Summer", as they return to the village and disembark.

=== Tokyo DisneySea version ===
In the "Anna and Elsa's Frozen Journey" ride, guests experience the story of Princess Anna saving her sister, Queen Elsa, from an assassination attempt through the power of true love, and Elsa melting Anna's frozen heart to end the eternal winter.

First, guests are invited on the Arendelle Royal Tour. During the tour, they can see portraits and music boxes featuring Anna and Elsa. Along the way, Olaf may be seen outside the window.

Next, guests board boats and sail into the night sea. A group of young trolls asks Grand Pabbie to tell them the story of Anna and Elsa, and he agrees, magically projecting the past. A video shows a scene where Elsa accidentally hurts Anna. Then, guests move across the water and enter the world of Anna and Elsa's past.

In a dark room, Anna asks, "Do you want to build a snowman?" Elsa replies, "Go away, Anna." The boat then descends backward to "Coronation Day," where Anna and Elsa sing "For The First Time In Forever." The boat then accelerates forward, passing by Anna and Prince Hans singing "Love is an Open Door." Elsa then says, "Close the gate." Anna asks Elsa, "What are you scared of?" Frustrated, Elsa freezes Arendelle with her magic and runs away from the Duke of Weselton. Anna heads to the North Mountain to find Elsa, meeting Kristoff, Sven, and Olaf along the way. Olaf tells Anna and Kristoff where Elsa is.

Guests then ascend a lift towards the North Mountain, witnessing Elsa feeling lonely and worried and singing "Let It Go." Guests pass Elsa as she creates an ice staircase with her magic. The gate opens, and guests see Elsa singing "Let It Go" while magically creating ice. The boat and passengers then descend backward down a small drop, leaving Elsa's ice palace, and the gate closes with her words, "The cold never bothered me anyway."

Next, Anna convinces Elsa to end the winter, but Elsa's ice accidentally hurts her. The boat then descends backward, and Prince Hans attempts to strike Elsa with his sword. Anna stops Hans right as she freezes over. As a heartbroken Elsa grieves for Anna, Anna thaws back to life due to her sacrifice.

Finally, the boat descends forward, and guests return to a thawed Arendelle, where they see Anna, Elsa, and the people of Arendelle enjoying themselves.

== See also ==
- List of Epcot attractions
- Norway Pavilion at Epcot
- List of Hong Kong Disneyland attractions
- List of Tokyo DisneySea attractions
- List of Disney Adventure World attractions
