= Remy's Ratatouille Adventure =

3D dark ride at Disney theme parks

Remy’s Ratatouille Adventure
- Logo of the attraction at Epcot

- Attraction entrance at Disney Adventure World (then Walt Disney Studios Park) from Disneyland Paris in 2014

Disney Adventure World
- Name: Ratatouille: L'Aventure Totalement Toquée de Rémy
- Area: Worlds of Pixar
- Status: Operating
- Opening date: July 10, 2014
- Disney Premier Access available

Epcot
- Name: Remy's Ratatouille Adventure
- Area: World Showcase (France)
- Status: Operating
- Opening date: October 1, 2021
- Lightning Lane available

Ride statistics
- Attraction type: Dark ride
- Designer: Walt Disney Imagineering
- Theme: Ratatouille
- Music: Michael Giacchino
- Capacity: 2,220 riders per hour
- Vehicle type: Ratmobile (Automated guided vehicle)
- Vehicles: 36
- Riders per vehicle: 6
- Rows: 2
- Riders per row: 3
- Duration: 4:40
- Queue host: Auguste Gusteau
- Ride host: Remy
- Single rider line available
- Wheelchair accessible

Remy's Ratatouille Adventure, also known as Ratatouille: L'Aventure Totalement Toquée de Rémy (lit.‍, 'Remy's Totally Zany Adventure'), is a trackless dark ride located at Disney Adventure World in France and Epcot in Florida. The ride first opened at Walt Disney Studios Park on 21 June 2014. A second version opened at Epcot in 2021.

Remy's Ratatouille Adventure is set in the world of Pixar's Ratatouille, where guests encounter various characters from the film.

In both versions, the ride's dialogue alternates between English and French.

== Summary ==
The attraction's exterior is that of Gusteau's restaurant, and the surrounding buildings of a Parisian plaza, with the queue set in an artist's loft leading to the rooftops of Paris, where guests are "shrunk" to the size of a rat.

After guests board their "ratmobiles" on the roof of Gusteau's restaurant, Remy and Gusteau are deciding which meal to prepare for them. After deciding on their famous ratatouille dish, Remy and the guests fall through a swinging roof glass-pane, landing on the restaurant kitchen floor. This starts a chase sequence with Remy leading the guests and other rats away from the cooks, passing through the walk-in freezer and under a hot oven.

Guests eventually end up in the dining area, attracting attention from customers and causing a riot. Chef Skinner tries to get rid of the rats and the guests, while Linguini tries to help them escape into a nearby vent. The escape through the vent in the walls is almost wrecked by Skinner, who angrily attempts to grab the guests through the venting grids. In the end, they make it safely to Remy's kitchen, where the cooking of the ratatouille is ongoing.

The guests are bid farewell by Remy and Gusteau, while the rat colony is feasting on Remy's cooking. In Paris, the attraction exits at the restaurant Bistrot Chez Rémy, unlike at Epcot.

Patton Oswalt, Peter Sohn, Brian Dennehy, Brad Garrett, Lou Romano, Ian Holm, Janeane Garofalo and Peter O'Toole reprise their voice roles from the original film as Remy, Emile, Django, Augustine Gusteau, Alfredo Linguini, Chef Skinner, Colette Tatou and Anton Ego, respectively.

== Production ==
=== History ===
==== Disney Adventure World ====
In 2008, rumors began online that Disneyland Paris planned to construct a Ratatouille-themed ride in Worlds of Pixar for the park's 20th anniversary. Following the initial rumors, articles on the Internet surfaced concept paintings, ride blueprints, and images of the first phases of construction, confirming that there would be such an attraction. Construction of the attraction officially began in 2012, under the name "Ratatouille: Désastre en Cuisine," or "Ratatouille Kitchen Calamity". The attraction was formally announced in March 2013 at the Euro Disney S.C.A. annual shareholders meeting as "Ratatouille: L'Aventure Totalement Toquée de Rémy" with the opening date set for Summer 2014. Construction for the attraction was completed in June 2014 with an estimated budget of US$150-240 million. On 21 June 2014, the attraction was officially inaugurated by then-president and CEO of The Walt Disney Company, Robert Iger. The attraction fully opened to the public on 10 July 2014.

On 27 August 2021, following Disneyland Paris' reopening, Walt Disney Studios Park announced that the attraction was set to become part of the Worlds of Pixar area.

On 26 August 2025, it was announced that the attraction will be temporarily closed in October 2025 for refurbishment, technical upgrades and scenic enhancements, before reopening on March 28, 2026.

==== Epcot ====
On 15 July 2017, Disney Parks announced during a D23 Expo presentation that a duplicate of the ride would come to Epcot's France Pavilion at Walt Disney World in Orlando, Florida in 2020. Construction began in November of the same year with land clearing. Due to the impact of the COVID-19 pandemic, the attraction's opening was delayed from 2020 until October 1, 2021, to celebrate the 50th anniversary of Walt Disney World.

The attraction underwent a short refurbishment from November 10 to 14, 2025. During that time, the ride transitioned from 3D visuals to 2D.

=== Ride technology ===
The attraction uses LPS trackless ride technology, same as Rise of the Resistance, Mickey & Minnie's Runaway Railway and Mystic Manor. The ride uses rat-shaped vehicles to automatically slide across the ground with no track. It also contains 3D dome segments of the ride that the vehicles ride into, though it was announced in the Fall of 2025 that both versions would no longer be in 3D. Different scent effects are employed in each room of the ride.

== Gallery ==
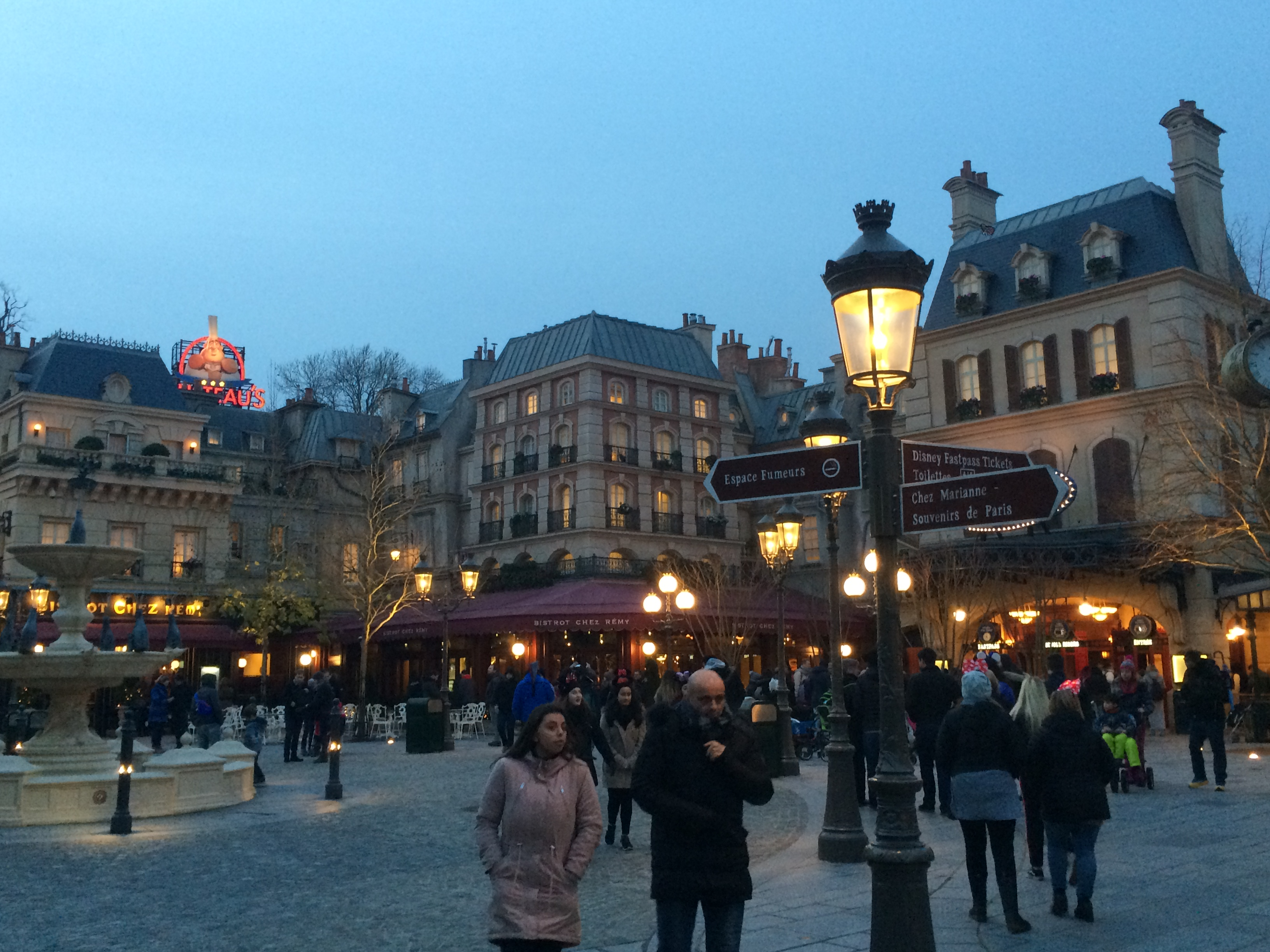
Exterior of the show building at Walt Disney Studios from Disneyland Paris

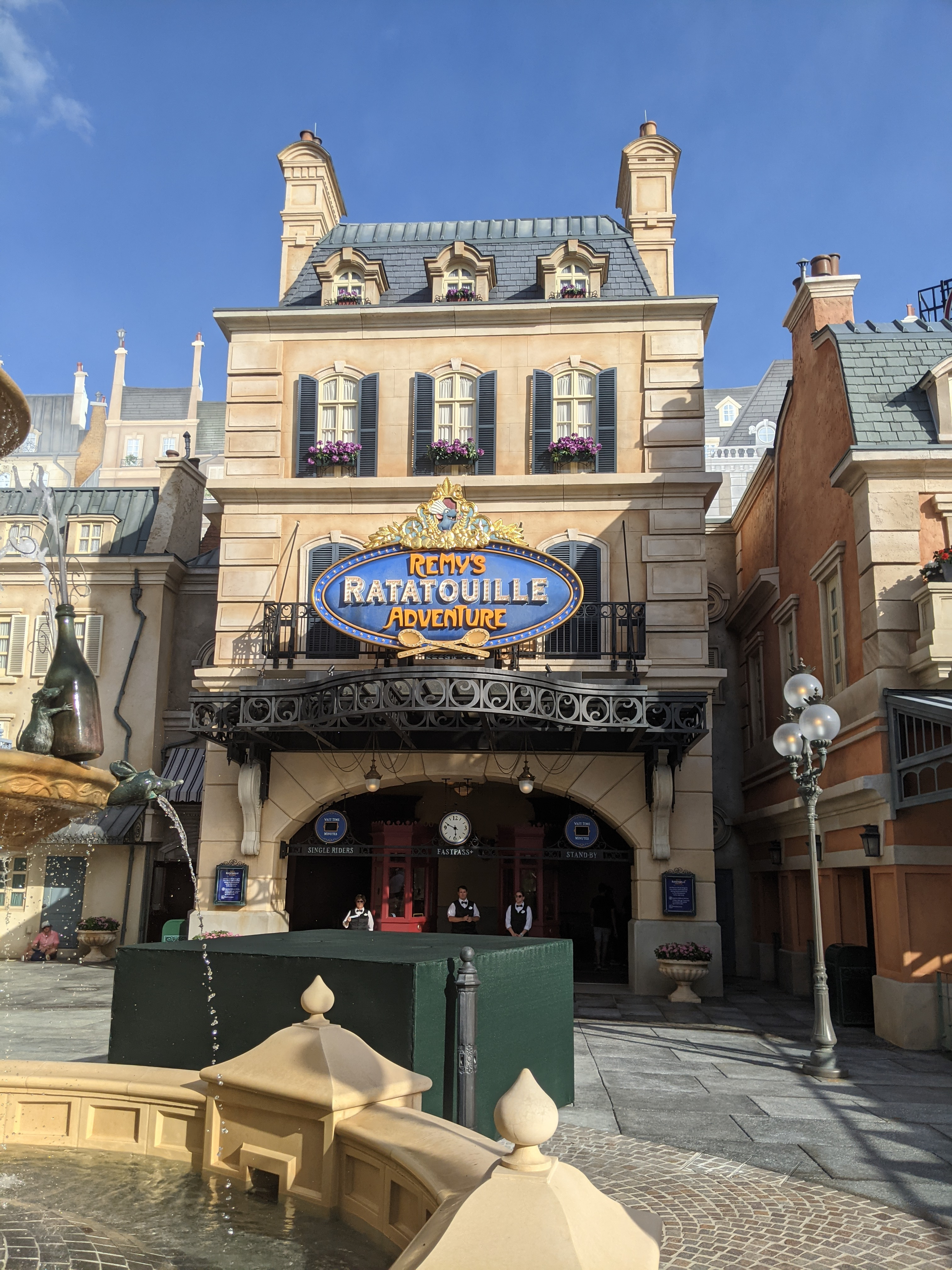
Entrance to the ride at Epcot from Walt Disney World
