= Euro Disney S.A.S. =

Travel and holiday companies of France

- Type: Subsidiary
- Headquarters: Marne-la-Vallée, France
- Products: Theme parks
- Revenue: ▼EUR 1,278 million (2016)
- Operating income: ▼EUR −242 million (2016)
- Net income: ▼EUR −858 million (2014)
- Total assets: EUR 2,160.20 million
- Total equity: EUR −167.10 million
- Number of employees: 14,064
- Parent: Disney Parks International (Disney Experiences) (The Walt Disney Company)
- Divisions: Euro Disney Associés S.C.A.
- Website: disneylandparis.com

Euro Disney S.A.S. is a wholly owned subsidiary of The Walt Disney Company responsible for Disneyland Paris in Marne-la-Vallée, France.

Disneyland Paris comprises Disneyland Park, Disney Adventure World, Disney Village, and seven on-site Disney Hotels. Val d'Europe is a new residential and shopping development. Another seven hotels/residences have been built not far from the two Disney theme parks on land held under Euro Disney SCA's lease, including properties from companies such as Holiday Inn, Kyriad, MyTravel and Radisson Hotels.

Prior to 2017, it was a publicly listed French company Euro Disney S.C.A. Since then has been de-listed and become a wholly owned subsidiary. Euro Disney S.C.A was a result of an agreement signed on 24 March 1987 between The Walt Disney Company and the French Authorities for the development of a new tourist destination, and construction began within a year. Since opening on 12 April 1992, the Resort has created more than 30,000 jobs (both directly and indirectly) in the region to the east of Paris. In 2012, it was the number one tourist destination in Europe with 16 million visits recorded..

== History ==
=== 1980s ===
In May 1985, Walt Disney Productions indicated that they would build a European Disneyland park with a location expected to be selected by September. (Note: Maclean's, 8 July 1985, Volume 98. Page 42.) A letter of intent was signed on 15 December 1985 by CEO Michael Eisner and then French Prime Minister Laurent Fabius in regards to building the theme park at Marne-la-Vallée, France on 4400 acres. (Note: Time, 30 December 1985, Volume 126. Page 64.) The theme park plans were approved by the Île-de-France regional council on 11 July 1986. (Note: The New York Times,12 July 1986. Page 34.) The Walt Disney Company appointed Robert Fitzpatrick as Euro Disneyland president on 12 March 1987. (Note: The New York Times, 13 March 1987. Page D4.) On 24 March 1987 Euro Disney signed an agreement with the French government. (Note: The New York Times, 25 March 1987. Page D3.) Construction on Euro Disney Resort began in August 1988. (Note: Disney Magazine, Fall 1997. Page 72.) In February 1989, Euro Disney SCA was created to license The Walt Disney Company's intellectual property and run the French theme park. (Note: Disneyland Paris – In Brief, by ?, 1994.) Euro Disney went public by trading on the Paris Stock Exchange on 8 October at US$14 a share with 42.9 million shares sold. (Note: The Keys to the Kingdom, by Kim Masters, 2001. Page 281.) However, French communists pelted Eisner with eggs, flour and tomato sauce during the stock launch.

=== 1990s ===
In 1990, The Disney Company issued US$2.25 billion in convertible bonds through Merrill Lynch to fund building Euro Disneyland . (Note: Forbes, 1 October 1990, Volume 146. Page 208.) with an additional US$770 million in bonds offered by Euro Disney in October. (Note: The Keys to the Kingdom, by Kim Masters, 2001. Page 281.) The second international Disney theme park, Euro Disneyland, opens as part of Euro Disney Resort in Marne-la-Vallée, France on 12 April 1992, with five theme lands: Adventureland, Discoveryland, Fantasyland, Frontierland, and Main Street plus Festival Disney resort area. (Note: The New York Times, 13 April 1992. Page A1.)

=== 2000s ===
In 2005, Euro Disney delisted from the London Stock Exchange

=== 2010s ===
In 2013, Virginie Calmels became the chairman of Euro Disney's supervisory board.

In 2015, the company was restructured with a $1.3Bn recapitalisation, The Walt Disney company injected EUR420 Million and converted EUR600 Million of debt into capital. The restructuring also came with a 9-to-1 rights issue, hoping to raise EUR351 Million

In 2017, The Walt Disney Company offered an informal takeover of Euro Disney SCA, buying 9% of the company from Kingdom Holding and an open offer of 2 Euro per share for the remaining stock. This brought The Walt Disney Company's total ownership to 85.7%. The Walt Disney company will also invest an additional 1.5 Billion Euro to strengthen the company.

On 13 June 2017, The Walt Disney Company announced the offer was successful and they hold over the 95%, Euro Disney S.C.A was delisted on 20 June, falling entirely under Disney Parks, Experiences and Products for the first time in its 25-year history, making The Walt Disney Company the sole owners of the Disneyland Paris property.

== Administration ==
- Présidente of Disneyland Paris – Natacha Rafalski
  - Senior vice president, Commercial – Grégoire Champetier
    - Boris Solbach – Vice President, Finance & chief financial officer
  - Senior vice president, Operations & COO – Daniel Delcourt
    - Angela Bliss – Vice President, Communications and Public Affairs
    - Gilles Dobelle – Vice president, Legal
  - Francesca Romana Gianesin – Senior vice president, Experience & Product Synergy & Integration
