= Animagique =

Defunct live show

Disney Adventure World
- Area: Studio 3, Toon Studio
- Status: Removed
- Opening date: March 16, 2002
- Closing date: January 31, 2016
- Replaced by: Mickey and the Magician

Ride statistics
- Attraction type: Live Stage Show
- Designer: Walt Disney Imagineering
- Theme: History of Disney's Animation
- Audience capacity: 1110 guests per performance per show
- Duration: 20 minutes
- Wheelchair accessible

Animagique was a live show at Disney Adventure World in France, housed in Studios 3, at the entrance of Toon Studio. The show closed on January 31, 2016, to become the Animagique Theater building for Mickey and the Magician which began on July 2, 2016.

== Plot ==
The show opens with Mickey and Donald teaching a drawing course in a room. At its far end is a door leading to the Cinematheque, which is strictly forbidden, as Mickey instructs Donald. However, after Mickey's departure, Donald decides he can open the door a little, without Mickey even knowing.

As he does so, a flash of light takes Donald into the film vault. He then encounters scenes from various films including Dumbo, The Jungle Book, Pinocchio (formerly), The Little Mermaid and The Lion King.

At the end, Donald tells Mickey about his amazing journey through the films, but Mickey doesn't believe him until Baloo, King Louie, and Rafiki walk into the room.

== Development ==
Before the opening of the park in 2002, Animagique puppeteers undertook intense training classes to co-ordinate and synchronise their movements in complete darkness, and followed classes of Taï Chi to perfect their perception of space.

Mickey and Sebastian were the only two characters that spoke French, with the other characters: Donald, Pink Elephants, Baloo, King Louie, Young Simba and Zazu speaking English. The character's English voice actors, Jim Cummings, Jason Weaver and Jeff Bennett, recorded new dialogue for the show.

The puppets of Young Simba, Young Nala and Zazu, were reused from Magic Kingdom's former show The Legend of the Lion King.

Several months after opening, the show briefly closed to allow for a reworking that included replacing an original Pinocchio scene, featuring Monstro the whale, but it was scrapped shortly as it was deemed too scary for children, and it was replaced by a scene incorporating The Little Mermaid.
