= Disney Adventure World =

Theme park at Disneyland Paris

- Previously known as Walt Disney Studios Park (2002–2026)
- Entrance to Disney Adventure World, when it was known as Walt Disney Studios Park
- Interactive map of Disney Adventure World
- Location: Disneyland Paris, Marne-la-Vallée, France
- Coordinates: 48°52′2″N 2°46′45″E
- Status: Operating
- Opened: 16 March 2002; 24 years ago (as Walt Disney Studios Park); 29 March 2026; 7 months ago (as Disney Adventure World)
- Owner: Disney Experiences (The Walt Disney Company)
- Operated by: Disney Experiences
- Theme: Show business and Disney entertainment
- Operating season: Year-round
- Website: Official website

Disney Adventure World (formerly known as Walt Disney Studios Park) is the second of two theme parks built at Disneyland Paris in Marne-la-Vallée, France. The park opened on 16 March 2002, and it is owned and operated by the Walt Disney Company through its Experiences division. Upon opening, it was dedicated to show business, movie themes, production, and behind-the-scenes. In the 2010s, in a similar manner to Disney's Hollywood Studios at Walt Disney World Resort in Florida, it began to distance itself from the original studio backlot theming. It entered a new direction of attraction development inspired by Disney stories. The park is represented by the Earffel Tower, a water tower with Mickey Mouse ears similar to the one formerly located at Disney's Hollywood Studios, which in turn was inspired by the water tower at the Walt Disney Studios lot in Burbank, California.

In 2024, the park hosted 5.59 million visitors, making it the 20th-most visited theme park in the world and the fourth-most visited in Europe.

In 2026, the park underwent a €2 billion overhaul that would double the footprint of the park, adding Adventure Way featuring a new central lake, Adventure Bay, and a World of Frozen land.

== History ==
Initial plans for a second theme park, named Disney-MGM Studios Europe or Disney-MGM Studios Paris, were scheduled to open in 1995, though these plans were canceled around mid-1992 due to the resort's financial issues at the time. After the resort began to make a profit, these plans were revived on a much smaller scale. The park was announced on 29 September 1999. Construction would officially begin a year later in 2000. Walt Disney Studios Park officially opened to the public on 16 March 2002 to coincide with the resort's 10th anniversary. Out of the park's nine original attractions, three rides were able to open on time, which were "Rock 'n' Roller Coaster Avec Aerosmith", Studio Tram Tour: Behind the Magic and Flying Carpets Over Agrabah. The park was initially a commercial failure due in part to the downfall of tourism after the September 11 attacks, cheap studio backlot theme, lack of attractions, rushed construction and low attendance levels.

In the 2019 documentary series The Imagineering Story, Bruce Vaughn, the Chief Creative Executive of Walt Disney Imagineering, described his reaction when he visited the park when it first opened:

The first time I went to Paris' second gate, it was after hours. No kidding, for the first ten minutes, I'm walking through, and I was like, 'When are we gonna be in the park?' And he turned to me, and he goes, 'You're in the park.' And I'm like, 'I'm on stage?' He goes, 'You're on stage.' Like, 'This looks backstage.' It's a bunch of gray warehouses. He goes, 'Yeah. It's supposed to be like a studio.' But again, it was this notion of, 'Ah, the people… the guests will buy it. This is what a studio really looks like. The guests, they just want, you know,' and it's like talking yourself in at the highest levels of, the guests… the guests would just buy this stuff.

In 2007, Walt Disney Studios Park began expanding. June 2007 saw an expansion to Animation Courtyard opened along with the new area-wide name "Toon Studio". It is themed as a "toon backlot", representing the film studio workplace of animated characters, where they produce their animated films. The concept has been created exclusively for Walt Disney Studios Park and features two rides not seen in any other Disney theme park, along with small merchandising locations and many character meet-and-greets. This expansion phase added Crush's Coaster, an indoor spinning roller coaster, and Cars Quatre Roues Rallye themed after Pixar's 2006 film Cars. A similar ride is found in Mermaid Lagoon at Tokyo DisneySea. On 22 December 2007, Production Courtyard grew in size with the introduction of The Twilight Zone Tower of Terror, which soft opened with the new Hollywood Boulevard.

In March 2008, a variant of Stitch Encounter was imported from Hong Kong Disneyland with the new name 'Stitch live!'. It was one of two shows introduced to replace the Disney Channel Studio Tour and Cyberspace Mountain attractions.

In 2009, new entertainment opened at Walt Disney Studios to run alongside Mickey's Magical Party, which began in April 2009. Playhouse Disney – Live on Stage! was the second of the two shows to replace the Disney Channel Studio Tour and was presented in French, English and Spanish. In addition to Playhouse Disney – Live on Stage! came the opening of Disney Stars 'n' Cars, a smaller version of Disney Stars and Motor Cars Parade imported from Disney's Hollywood Studios at Walt Disney World, Florida. The parade was introduced to replace 'Disney's Cinema Parade' which had been operating since opening in 2002.

In August 2010, expansions continued with the opening of Toy Story Playland to coincide with the new Disney·Pixar film Toy Story 3, "shrinking" guests to the size of a toy. The three attractions are a Half Pipe coaster named RC Racer, a parachute jumpstyle ride named Toy Soldiers Parachute Drop, and a Music Express train named Slinky Dog Zigzag Spin, all themed intricately around the first two Toy Story films.

The first push of expansions came to an end with the addition of 'Ratatouille: L'Aventure Totalement Toquée de Rémy', soft opening on 21 June 2014 and fully opening on 10 July.

On 27 February 2018, Bob Iger announced a transformative multi-year expansion, opening in phases from 2021. The cost of this expansion is €2 billion. It will feature new areas based on Marvel and Frozen, all surrounding a new lake.

This second round of expansion began with the closing of Armageddon – Les Effets Speciaux on 31 March 2019, followed by "Rock 'n' Roller Coaster Avec Aerosmith" (2 September 2019), Studio Tram Tour: Behind the Magic (6 January 2020) and The Moteurs... Action! (13 March 2020) for both the walkway to the lake expansion to be started (demolition of the tram tour station) and for Avengers Campus to replace the Backlot area of the park.

On 14 March 2020, Walt Disney Studios Park, alongside Disneyland Park, temporarily closed due to the COVID-19 pandemic in France. Both parks reopened on 15 July 2020 with strict rules such as limited guest attendance, social distancing, and mandatory wearing of face masks. The park closed again on 29 October 2020 following a second nationwide lockdown, the resort's original intended reopening on 2 April 2021 was ultimately deferred to 17 June.

On 15 June 2021, the new changes and expansion to the park started to arrive with the soft opening of Cars: Road Trip. This attraction consists of the loop for 'Catastrophe Canyon' from the Studio Tram Tour redecorated with props and characters based on the world of the 2006 film Cars.

On 9 July 2022, Avengers Campus soft opened as the first phase of the aforementioned expansion. It opened with the Spider-Man W.E.B. Adventure and the rethemed "Rock 'n' Roller Coaster Avec Aerosmith", known as Avengers Assemble: Flight Force.

On 12 April 2024, Disney announced that as of the opening of the now-named 'World of Frozen', Walt Disney Studios Park would be rebranded as Disney Adventure World. The park will consist of the areas 'World Premiere' (Formerly Studio 1), World Premiere Plaza (which will incorporate Toon Studio and Production Courtyard), 'World of Frozen', 'Adventure Bay' (The lake), and 'Adventure Way'. These will be joined by Front Lot (which was being permanently closed to make way for World Premiere Plaza), Worlds of Pixar, and Avengers Campus scheduled to debut in 2025.

On 24 May 2024, it was announced that The Moteurs... Action! was replaced by a new outdoor show, Alice & The Queen of Hearts: Back to Wonderland, and the area was renamed Theater of the Stars, which became part of the last remaining Production Courtyard area until 29 September 2024 and right behind the location of Avengers Campus, since the final performance of The Moteurs... Action! and Backlot area would be permanently closed due to the COVID-19 pandemic on Paris for over four years ago.

At D23: The Ultimate Disney Fan Event 2024 on 11 August 2024, it was announced that "World of Frozen" was delayed to 2026, while a new Lion King Land will be built at Disney Adventure World.

On 30 September 2024, a new nighttime show called Doctor Strange: Mystery of the Mystics was announced for the Avengers Campus at Walt Disney Studios Park. The following month in October, the park unveiled plans for a new temporary show, Minnie's Musical Moment, scheduled to operate in Studio D from 1 November 2024 until 30 March 2025. World Premiere and World Premiere Plaza opened on 15 May 2025, and World Premiere occupies the area where the Front Lot was formerly situated.

On 24 November 2025, it was announced that the opening date for Adventure Way and World of Frozen would be 29 March 2026 at Disney Adventure World. On 29 March 2026, the park was renamed Disney Adventure World with the opening of the new lands, Adventure Way and World of Frozen and a new lake called Adventure Bay. More details were released in August 2026 at D23: The Ultimate Disney Fan Event 2026, which revealed that the Lion King land will feature an attraction with iconic moments and songs.

== Areas ==
Disney Adventure World is divided into five "worlds." Originally, these were to represent various aspects of film production present at a Hollywood film studio, though this connection has weakened over time with the addition of lands themed for prominent film franchises.

When the park was referred to as Walt Disney Studios Park, the lands were referred to as "studio lots."

=== World Premiere Plaza ===
World Premiere Plaza features attractions and shopping based on Pixar and Walt Disney Animation Studios franchises, including a live show, Disney Jr. Dream Factory, Stitch Live!, TOGETHER: a Pixar Musical Adventure, Animation Celebration and Mickey and the Magician. The land also contains Hollywood Boulevard, which features Hollywood-inspired street sets and the attraction The Twilight Zone Tower of Terror - A New Dimension of Chills. Since the venue closed in April 2024, it was reopened in May 2025 after a refurbishment as World Premiere (as a new entrance area) in Disney Theater, with the counter-service restaurant Hollywood Gardens Restaurant.

| Name | Opened | Description |
|---|---|---|
| Food Trucks | 2002 | Various food trucks selling different snacks and drinks. |
| Studio D | 2008 | Since 2008, the live-show theatre is currently home to Stitch Live!, where an interactive, living character show where guests communicate with Stitch from Lilo & Stitch and the upcoming shows, Minnie's Dream Factory, where a live interactive show featuring the characters from Disney Jr.. Previous show have included Disney Jr. Dance Factory and Minnie's Musical Moment. |
| The Twilight Zone Tower of Terror | 2007 | accelerated drop tower dark ride based on The Twilight Zone. |
| Studio Theatre | 2002 | A live-show theatre that was formerly the longtime show of CinéMagique. Since 2023, the current show in the theatre is the Disney/Pixar-themed TOGETHER: A Pixar Musical Adventure. Previous shows have included Marvel: Heroes Unite, Merry Jolly Jingle, The Lion King: Rhythm of the Pridelands (playback of recorded show from Frontierland in Disneyland Park for guests unable to secure tickets to watch live) and has also held various character meet & greets. |
| Animagique Theatre | 2002 | An indoor theatre that is currently home to the live-action stage show Mickey and the Magician. Set in the atelier of the titular magician (of Fantasia origin) in 20th century Paris, his apprentice Mickey gets into mischief, as he explores and learns to use his magic. |
| Animation Celebration | 2002 | Walk-through exhibition attraction that celebrates the magic of Disney animation. The venue hosts the interactive experience Frozen: A Musical Invitation, wherein guests step into the snowy world of Frozen to meet Elsa, Anna, Kristoff, Olaf, and Sven. Guests can also participate in the Animation Academy, where they can be instructed on the hand-drawing of Disney characters. |
| Flying Carpets Over Agrabah | 2002 | An aerial carousel ride very similar to the famous Dumbo the Flying Elephant. The attraction is set against a large "movie set" backdrop of Agrabah where riders act as extras in the Genie's directorial debut as they fly on magic carpets. It is a clone of The Magic Carpets of Aladdin at the Magic Kingdom, and is the only opening-day attraction at the park that remains open to this day. |
| Theater of the Stars | 2024 (seasonal) | Seasonal summer stunt show, that hosted Alice & the Queen of Hearts: Back To Wonderland in 2024 and 2025, based on Alice in Wonderland, and expected to reopen for Summer 2026. Formerly used for the Moteurs... Action!: Stunt Show Spectacular. |
| Toon Studio Catering Co | 2007 | Outdoor food trucks. |
| World Premiere | 2025 | A covered walkway with shop and restaurants themed after a soundstage with a reception of a Hollywood street inside. |
| Hollywood Gardens Restaurant | 2025 | A counter-service restaurant. |

=== Worlds of Pixar ===
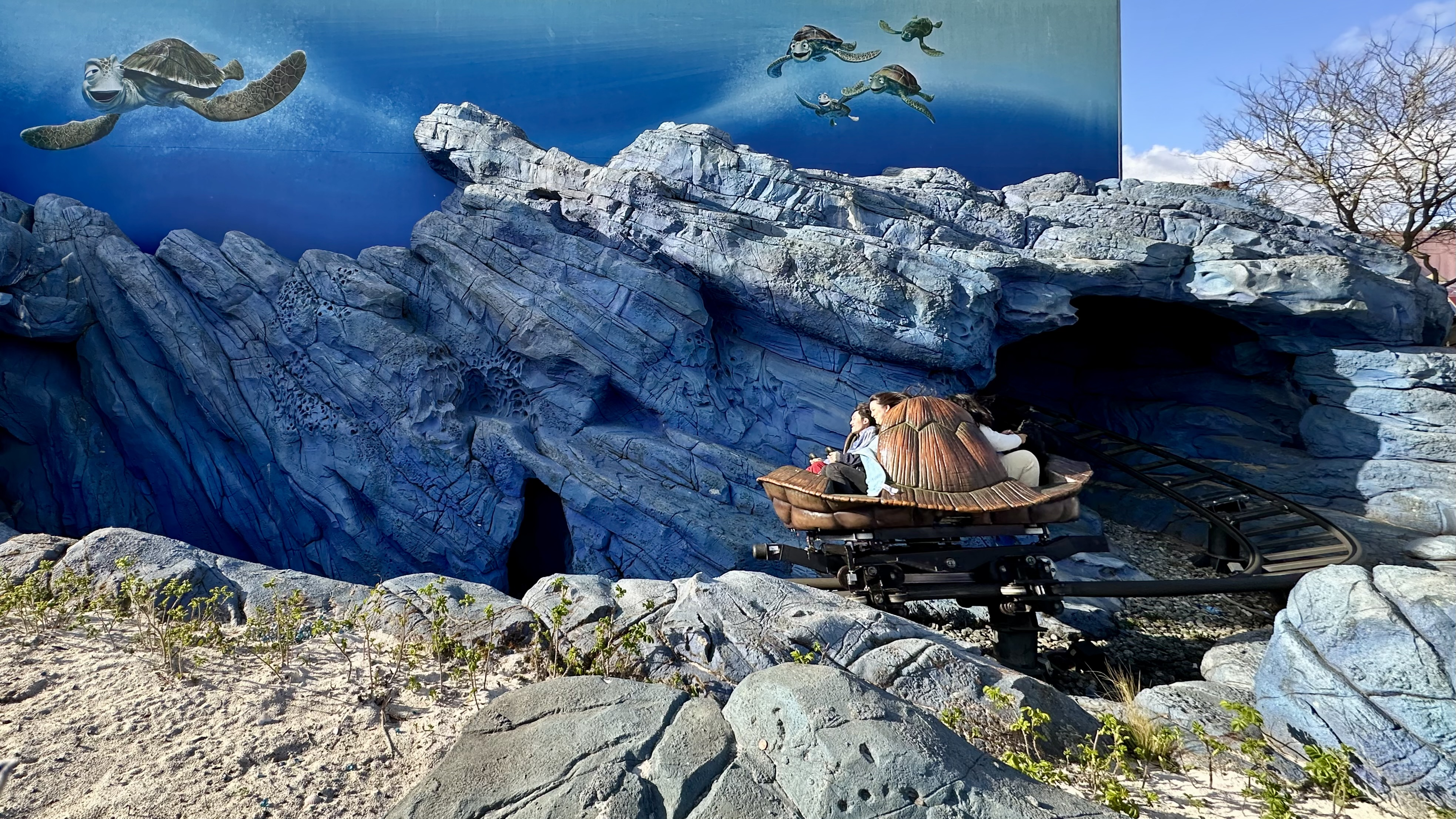
Crush’s Coaster.

Formerly a part of the Toon Studio section, the Worlds of Pixar area features rides, attractions, shopping, and restaurants based on Pixar's Finding Nemo, Cars and Ratatouille franchises.

| Name | Opened | Description |
|---|---|---|
| Bistrot Chez Rémy | 2014 | A premium table-service restaurant serving French cuisine. It is based on Ratatouille and set within the Paris-themed area. |
| Crush's Coaster | 2007 | A spinning roller coaster where guests enter the beached sound stage and film set of Finding Nemo, where Crush invites them to climb aboard sea turtle shells for a ride through memorable scenes from the movie. |
| Cars Quatre Roues Rallye | 2007 | A Zamperla Demolition Derby where guests spin at a Radiator Springs car service station. Their cars are located on four spinning plateaus and they change from one spinning plateau to the next. |
| Cars: Road Trip | 2021 | An abridged version of the defunct Studio Tram Tour themed to the Cars franchise. This attraction utilises part of the Studio Tram Tour track, and the "Catastrophe Canyon" portion of the former ride. It has been designed as a "temporary ride to increase park capacity until the new expansions open". |
| Laugh'N' Go! | 2021 | A food truck serving cheese-based products from The Laughing Cow. |
| Ratatouille: L'Aventure Totalement Toquée de Rémy | 2014 | A motion-based trackless dark ride based on the 2007 Disney·Pixar animated film Ratatouille. It opened in a new Paris themed area of the park. |

==== Toy Story Playland ====
Toy Story Playland is a sub-area of Worlds of Pixar themed to the Toy Story franchise, which opened on 17 August 2010 to market and promote Toy Story 3. The area shrinks guests down to the size of the toy as they ride three over-sized attractions.

| Name | Opened | Description |
|---|---|---|
| RC Racer | 2010 | A steel shuttle roller coaster where guests ride on a 25-meter half-pipe aboard RC. |
| Slinky Dog Zigzag Spin | 2010 | A Caterpillar-style ride where guests twirl and swirl with Slinky Dog as he tries to grab his tail in front of his dog bowl. |
| Toy Soldiers Parachute Drop | 2010 | A parachute jump ride where guests test their parachute-floating skills with Sarge and the other Green Army Men. |
| Toy Story Playland Boutique | 2010 | Set within a Barrel of Monkeys container, this store sells Toy Story merchandise. |

=== Marvel Avengers Campus ===
Marvel Avengers Campus, a world themed around the Marvel Cinematic Universe, soft opened on 9 July 2022, and opened to the public 20 July 2022. Anchored as a transformed Paris-based secret location for S.H.I.E.L.D., the area's attractions and dining include Avengers Assemble: Flight Force (an Iron Man re-theme of Rock 'n' Roller Coaster Avec Aerosmith) and Spider-Man W.E.B. Adventure (a clone of Web Slingers: A Spider-Man Adventure from the American version of the land at Disney California Adventure). This area replaced the previous "Backlot" lot of the park.

| Name | Opened | Description |
|---|---|---|
| Avengers Assemble: Flight Force | 2022 | An indoor launched looping steel roller coaster where guests team up with Iron Man and Captain Marvel to save the world from an intergalactic threat. |
| FAN-tastic Food Truck | 2022 | Iron Man-themed food truck serving American-style food. |
| Hero Training Center | 2022 | Meet-and-Greet attraction that allows Heroic Encounters with Spider-Man and a random Marvel hero every day. |
| Pym Kitchen | 2022 | All-you-can-Eat buffet restaurant themed to Ant-Man and The Wasp. |
| Stark Factory | 2022 | Cafeteria-style restaurant set within a former Stark Industries building. |
| Super Diner | 2022 | 1940s-style table service restaurant themed within the Agent Carter series. Replaced Café des Cascadeurs. |
| WEB Food Truck | 2022 | Food Truck that sells Asian-style food. |
| Spider-Man W.E.B. Adventure | 2022 | 3D shooting screen attraction themed to Spider-Man. |

=== Adventure Way ===
Adventure Way opened in 2026 and features gardens and Art Nouveau architecture that lead from the front of the park to the new lake, Adventure Bay, and the new worlds being built off the lake. The world features Raiponce Tangled Spin experience and a new upcoming swing attraction based on the movie Up located on Adventure Way. The upcoming attraction began construction in the fall of 2025.

| Name | Opened | Description |
|---|---|---|
| Raiponce Tangled Spin | 2026 | A spinning boat ride attraction, inspired by Walt Disney Animation Studios' Tangled. |
| Wilderness Explorers Sky Swings | 2027 | A swing attraction based on Disney/Pixar's Up. |
| Musical Moment with Rapunzel and Flynn | 2026 | Musical Show. |
| Disney Marching Band | 2026 | Parade. |
| The Regal View Restaurant & Lounge | 2026 | Character dining location featuring Disney Princesses. The Lounge overlooks the lake. |
| Café Luminosity | 2026 | Hot Dogs and Snacks. |
| The Royal Röstis | 2026 | Röstis. |
| The Gourmet Loaves | 2026 | Cafe. |

==== Adventure Bay ====
At the centre of the extension, is a new central lake, Adventure Bay, and The Regal View Restaurant & Lounge, a character dining location featuring Disney Princesses. The restaurant will also feature views of the nighttime spectacular, Disney Cascade of Lights, on Adventure Bay. World of Frozen and the upcoming Lion King land will circle the new lake.

| Name | Opened | Description |
|---|---|---|
| Disney Cascade of Lights | 2026 | A nighttime spectacular, featuring water, fireworks and drones over Adventure Bay. |
| The Regal View Lounge | 2026 | lounge bar with views over the lake and viewing Disney Cascade of Lights nighttime show. |
| La Terrasse Panoramique | 2026 | Offers bread bowls, desserts, and beverages. |
| Chez Berlioz | 2026 | Features potato pancakes with various toppings. |
| Chez Toulouse | 2026 | Provides rolls with protein fillings like curry chicken and smoked salmon. |
| Chez Marie | 2026 | Serves Craquelin chou pastries with vanilla-flavored ice cream themed after Disney characters like Tiana, Rapunzel and Sleeping Beauty. |

=== World of Frozen ===
The second phase of the expansion will be World of Frozen which was originally scheduled to be open in 2023, but was delayed to 29 March 2026. The world is set in the kingdom of Arendelle (after the events of Frozen and before Frozen 2), where Queen Elsa has declared a Summer Snow Day for its citizens. A new and expanded version of Frozen Ever After debuted with the world as well as a restaurant and a shop.

| Name | Opened | Description |
|---|---|---|
| Frozen Ever After | 2026 | A reversing Shoot the chute/Dark ride in the water boat ride, featuring the characters of Walt Disney Animation Studios' film, Frozen. |
| A Celebration in Arendelle | 2026 | A daytime live show on the water in Arendelle Bay, featuring the Disney Animation Studios Frozen. |
| Rencontre Royale | 2026 | Elsa and Anna have opened the gates of Arendelle Castle, inviting you to join them in its majestic hall for a royal encounter. |
| Fjord View Shop | 2026 | Toys and plush shop. |
| Arendelle Boutique | 2026 | Frozen boutique shop. |
| Nordic Crowns Tavern | 2026 | Frozen themed restaurant. |

=== Former areas ===
==== Backlot ====
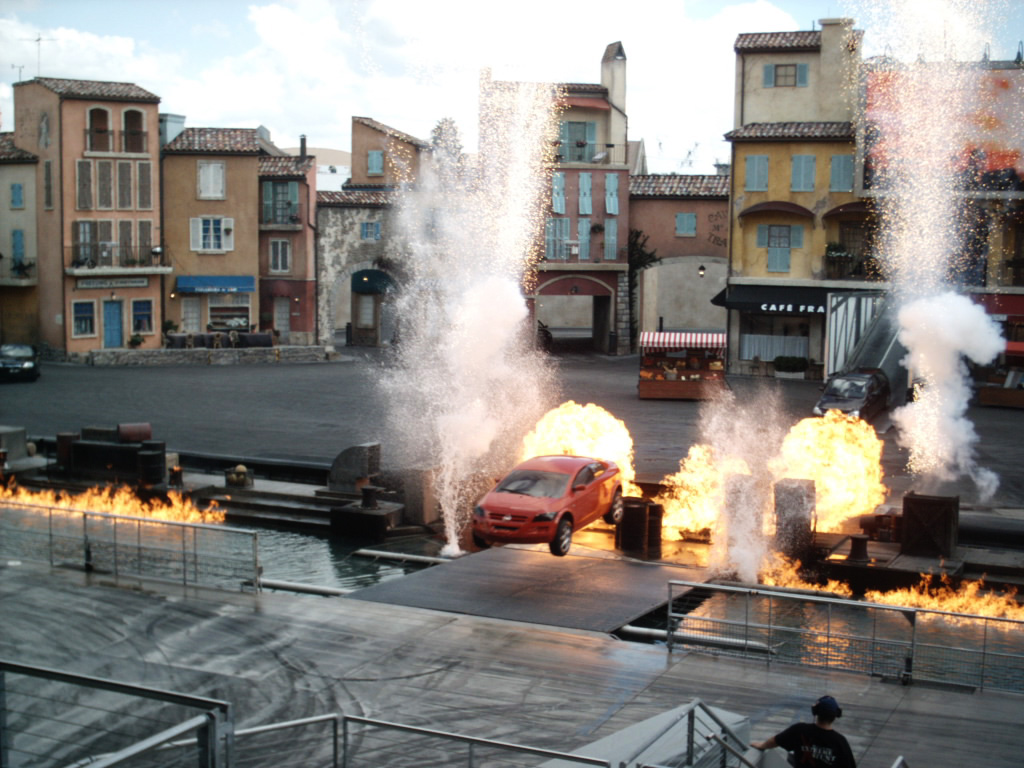
The former Moteurs... Action! Stunt Show

The Backlot was an opening day lot themed after actual movie backlots with an industrial theme. This lot featured the attractions Rock 'n' Roller Coaster Avec Aerosmith, the Moteurs... Action!: Stunt Show Spectacular, and the special effects show Armageddon – Les Effets Speciaux. The cafeteria service restaurant Blockbuster Café, the buffet Restaurant des Stars, and a small diner Café des Cascadeurs were also part of the Backlot. The Backlot's background music consisted of soundtracks from various action-oriented films, most notably Mission: Impossible 2, Planet of the Apes, Spy Game, Men in Black, Top Gun, Speed, Twister, Batman, Waterworld, The Replacement Killers, Lara Croft: Tomb Raider, Enemy of the State, A Knight's Tale, The Peacemaker, Backdraft, The Lord of the Rings: The Fellowship of the Ring, Independence Day and Atlantis: The Lost Empire. This area was closed in 2019 to make way for Avengers Campus, except for Theater of the Stars.

| Name | Opened | Closed | Description |
|---|---|---|---|
| Armageddon – Les Effets Speciaux | 2002 | 2019 | A special effects show which showed multiple scenes from the 1998 film Armageddon. The pre-show features a history of special effects video with clips from numerous films ranging from the Georges Méliès era to the modern era, including Pearl Harbor, Darby O'Gill and the Little People, The Abyss, Independence Day, Return of the Jedi, Dark City, Aliens, Dragonslayer and The Black Hole, as well as a speech from Michael Clarke Duncan, but initially had an interactive stage for green screen effect stunt performances. The attraction closed on 31 March 2019, to make way for Spider-Man W.E.B. Adventure. |
| Moteurs... Action!: Stunt Show Spectacular | 2002 | 2020 | A stunt show that showed how action movies are filmed, using car and motorbike stunts, as well as pyrotechnics. Located near the neighboring Rock 'n' Roller Coaster Avec Aerosmith, the show is set in a Mediterranean fishing village. There was also a clone of the attraction at Disney's Hollywood Studios in Orlando which operated from 2005 to 2016. The entrance was rerouted to Production Courtyard after the closure of Armageddon – Les Effets Speciaux in 2019. This attraction closed on 13 March 2020, as the final attraction of the area. The closure was moved earlier due to the COVID-19 pandemic in France, as it was initially planned to stay for a short time longer, but instead closed. Following the announcement, Walt Disney Studios Park announced that the Paris version of the show will be replaced by a new show, Alice & The Queen of Hearts: Back to Wonderland, and the area was renamed Theater of the Stars, which opened on 24 May 2024, and ran until 29 September 2024. The arena is now considered part of World Premiere Plaza. |
| Rock 'n' Roller Coaster Avec Aerosmith | 2002 | 2019 | The largest attraction of the area, and an almost exact clone of the ride found at Disney's Hollywood Studios in Orlando, with only a few story aspects changed, most notably the Tour de Force Records setting, pre-show and Soundtracker trains. The ride's queue line has background music consisting of individual songs from Coldplay, P.O.D., 3 Doors Down, The Chemical Brothers, Oasis, Reef, Guano Apes, Limp Bizkit and other different bands. The attraction closed on 2 September 2019, to be remodeled into Avengers Assemble: Flight Force, which retained the track layout. |

==== Front Lot ====
Front Lot serves as the park's main entrance and is home to most shops and services of the park, the Earffel Tower is located here. The entrance courtyard, La Place des Frères Lumière, is designed in Spanish Colonial Revival style, a style common in Hollywood in the 1930s. It is based on the design of the original Disney Bros. Studios on Hyperion Avenue. The central feature of the courtyard is a large Fantasia fountain. The name of the courtyard is a tribute to the French inventors of cinema.

Since the area was being permanently closed in April 2024, it was announced that the area will be redefined as part of World Premiere Plaza.

| Name | Opened | Closed | Description |
|---|---|---|---|
| Disney Studio 1 | 2002 | 2024 | A covered walkway with shops and restaurants themed after a soundstage with a recreation of a Hollywood street inside. |
| Hep Cat Club | 2002 | 2024 | Includes the Hep Cat Corner, a counter-service restaurant that opened in 2013. |
| Restaurant en Coulisse | 2002 | 2024 | A counter-service restaurant with two-floor seating. |

=== Future areas ===
==== World of Lion King ====
In August 2024, it was announced that a Lion King area with a flume ride based on the original 1994 animated film will be added to the park.

== Attendance ==
| 2011 | 2012 | 2013 | 2014 | 2015 | 2016 | 2017 | 2018 | 2019 | 2020 | 2021 | 2023 | Worldwide Rank |
|---|---|---|---|---|---|---|---|---|---|---|---|---|
| 4,710,000 | 4,800,000 | 4,470,000 | 4,260,000 | 4,440,000 | 4,970,000 | 5,200,000 | 5,298,000 | 5,245,000 | 1,410,000 | 1,884,000 | 5,700,000 | 23 |

=== Top 4 amusement parks in Europe by annual attendance (in millions) ===
| Disneyland Paris (Parc Disneyland) |
| Europa-Park |
| Efteling |
| Disney Adventure World (Walt Disney Studios Park) |

== Shows and parades ==
=== Current ===
*As of 20th October 2026

Parades & Cavalcades:
- Disney Princess Cavalcade: 2026–present

Daytime Shows:
- Disney Marching Band: 2026–present
- A Celebration in Arendelle: 2026–present
- Mickey and the Magician: 2016–2020, 2022–present
- Together: a Pixar Musical Adventure: 2023–present
- Stitch Live!: 2008–present
- Doctor Strange: Mystery of the Mystics 2024–present
- Alice & The Queen of Hearts: Back to Wonderland: May - Sept 2024, May - Aug 2025, Returning in 2027

Nighttime Shows:
- Disney Cascade of Lights: 2026–present

Special or seasonal events, shows, or parades:

- Christmas season [Disney Enchanted Christmas] (7th November 2026 – 6th January 2027)
    - Rings in the Seasons with Anna and Elsa: Begins on 7th November 2026

=== Retired ===
Parades & Cavalcades:
- Disney Cinema Parade: 2002–2008
- Stars 'n' Cars: 2009–2014

Daytime Shows:
- Animagique: 2002–2016
- CinéMagique: 2002–2017
- Moteurs... Action! Stunt Show Spectacular: 2002–2020
- Disney Junior Dream Factory: 2021–2024

Nighttime Shows:
- Avengers: Power The Night: 1 September – 5 November 2023, 1 December 2023 – 7 January 2024

== See also ==
- Disneyland Park (Paris)
- List of Disney Adventure World attractions
- Disney's Hollywood Studios, similar theme park in Walt Disney World Resort
- Disney California Adventure, the second theme park of Disneyland Resort
- Incidents at Disneyland Paris
