= Disney Junior – Live on Stage! =

Live Show

- Entrance

Disney's Hollywood Studios
- Area: Animation Courtyard
- Coordinates: 28.3578298°N 81.5599958°W
- Status: Closed
- Soft opening date: September 24, 2001
- Opening date: October 1, 2001 (Original); March 27, 2011
- Closing date: January 30, 2011 (Original); September 1, 2018
- Replaced: Bear in the Big Blue House – Live on Stage
- Replaced by: Disney Junior Dance Party! (2018–2020); Disney Junior Play and Dance! (2020–2025); Get Animated! (2025); Disney Jr. Mickey Mouse Clubhouse Live! (2026–present) (The Walt Disney Studios Lot)

Disney California Adventure
- Area: Hollywood Land
- Coordinates: 33.8070457°N 117.9180085°W
- Status: Closed
- Opening date: April 11, 2003 (Original); March 25, 2011
- Closing date: January 11, 2011 (Original); April 9, 2017
- Replaced: ABC Soap Opera Bistro
- Replaced by: Disney Junior Dance Party! (2017–2025); Disney Jr. Mickey Mouse Clubhouse Live! (2025–present)

Disney Adventure World
- Area: Production Courtyard
- Coordinates: 48.8666205°N 2.7799535°E
- Status: Closed
- Soft opening date: March 21, 2009
- Opening date: April 4, 2009
- Closing date: April 1, 2019
- Replaced: Walt Disney TV Tour: CyberSpace Mountain (Walt Disney Television Studios)
- Replaced by: Disney Junior Dream Factory (2021–2024); Minnie’s Musical Moment (2024–2025); Minnie’s Dream Factory (2026–present) (Studio D, World Premiere Plaza)

Ride statistics
- Attraction type: Live show
- Designer: Walt Disney Creative Entertainment
- Theme: Disney Jr.
- Duration: 24 minutes
- Previously known as: Playhouse Disney – Live on Stage! (2001–2011)
- Sponsor: None (2001–2016); Huggies Pull-Ups (2016–2018)
- Lightning Lane was available
- Wheelchair accessible
- Assistive listening available
- Closed captioning available

Disney Junior – Live on Stage!, originally Playhouse Disney – Live on Stage! until 2011, was a live show attraction featuring puppets of characters from Disney Jr.'s popular television programs, located at three Disney theme parks: Disney Adventure World at Disneyland Paris, Disney California Adventure at the Disneyland Resort and Disney's Hollywood Studios at the Walt Disney World Resort in Florida.

== History ==
=== Disney's Hollywood Studios ===
==== 1999-2001: The Bear in the Big House Era ====
Prior to Disney Junior – Live on Stage!, the theater was the Soundstage Restaurant from the park's opening date until November 14, 1998; the restaurant featured sets over the years from Big Business, Beauty and the Beast, and Aladdin. Following that, the theater hosted Bear in the Big Blue House – Live on Stage from June 7, 1999, until August 4, 2001.

==== 2001-2011: The Playhouse Disney Era ====
That show closed to make room for Playhouse Disney – Live on Stage!, which opened on October 1, 2001, featuring returning scaled down characters from Bear in the Big Blue House, as well as new characters from Rolie Polie Olie, Stanley, and The Book of Pooh.

In April 2005, the show replaced Rolie Polie Olie with JoJo's Circus. A re-imagined version of Playhouse Disney – Live on Stage! opened in March 2008, with some new characters from Mickey Mouse Clubhouse, Handy Manny, Little Einsteins, and My Friends Tigger & Pooh.

==== 2011-2018: The Disney Junior Era ====
The show was renamed in March 2011, following the rebranding of Playhouse Disney to Disney Jr., replacing My Friends Tigger & Pooh with Jake and the Never Land Pirates. In January 2013, the show replaced both Handy Manny and Little Einsteins with Sofia the First and Doc McStuffins.

==== 2018-2020: The Disney Junior Dance Party Era ====
Disney Junior – Live on Stage! closed on September 1, 2018. On December 22, 2018, the Hollywood Studios version was replaced by a new show named Disney Junior Dance Party! in 2018–2020, featuring characters from Mickey and the Roadster Racers, Sofia the First (which was eventually replaced by Vampirina), Doc McStuffins, and The Lion Guard.

On May 2, 2025, it was announced that Disney Junior Play and Dance! would be temporarily closed on May 25, 2025 and made way for a new DJ Dance Party, Get Animated! (until the final performance on September 1, 2025) in Animation Courtyard at Disney's Hollywood Studios, as part of Disney's Cool Kid Summer event.

On July 22, 2025, it was announced that the show will returned on September 2, 2025, until it was the final performance on September 25, 2025, and along with the entire Animation Courtyard area, which will be permanently closed to make way for Florida version of a new show, Disney Jr. Mickey Mouse Clubhouse Live!, themed to Mickey Mouse Clubhouse and the reboot in Stage 1 theater, which was became part of a new land, The Walt Disney Studios Lot, which will be open on May 26, 2026.

=== Disney California Adventure ===
The California version of the show follows the same pattern as the Florida version. Before Disney Junior – Live on Stage!, the theater was originally home to the ABC Soap Opera Bistro from the park's opening date until November 3, 2002, which featured dining areas that are replicas of the sets from All My Children, One Life to Live, and General Hospital. Due to its unpopularity, however, the restaurant closed to make way for Playhouse Disney – Live on Stage!, which was essentially the 2001 edition from Disney's Hollywood Studios (then known as Disney-MGM Studios), before being updated over the years up until the transition of Playhouse Disney to Disney Junior.

In 2013, the show was updated with segments based on Sofia the First and Doc McStuffins TV series from Disney Junior channel.

On May 26, 2017, the California version was replaced by a new show named Disney Junior Dance Party!, featuring characters from Mickey and the Roadster Racers, Sofia the First, Doc McStuffins, and The Lion Guard.

On October 15, 2021, the show was updated with Vampirina and replaced Sofia the First and The Lion Guard.

Following the announcement, Disney California Adventure announced that the final performance of Disney Junior Dance Party would be permanently closed on March 23, 2025, and make way for a new show in Disney Theater, which will be later this year. On March 31, 2025, it was announced that the new show that will take place in the Disney Theater will be called Disney Jr. Mickey Mouse Clubhouse Live!, themed to Mickey Mouse Clubhouse and the upcoming reboot. The new show debuted on May 16, 2025, as part of Disneyland Resort's 70th anniversary celebration.

=== Disney Adventure World ===
When Playhouse Disney – Live on Stage! first opened, it was essentially the 2008 edition from Disney's Hollywood Studios. Despite its name change at the time of the block's rebranding, the show itself had not been updated for unknown reasons. In April 2019, it closed to make way for the new interactive show "Disney Junior Dream Factory", which opened on July 1, 2021.

=== 2011–2013 Version ===
With the name change of Playhouse Disney to Disney Junior, the show also changed its name, this time to Disney Junior – Live on Stage! The My Friends Tigger & Pooh segment was replaced with a segment based on Jake and the Never Land Pirates.

=== 2013–2018 Version ===
The Handy Manny and Little Einsteins segments were replaced with segments based on Sofia the First and Doc McStuffins.

== Meet and Greets ==
Outside the theater at Disney's Hollywood Studios, there are meet-and-greet areas for Pluto and the titular characters from Vampirina, Fancy Nancy and Doc McStuffins.
