= Crush's Coaster =

Amusement ride

- The Great Barrier Reef scene

Disney Adventure World
- Location: Disney Adventure World
- Park section: Worlds of Pixar
- Coordinates: 48.8682°N 2.7777°E
- Status: Closed
- Opening date: June 9, 2007
- Closing date: September 7, 2026

General statistics
- Type: Steel – Spinning – Enclosed
- Manufacturer: Maurer AG
- Designer: Walt Disney Imagineering
- Speed: 60.7 km/h (37.7 mph)
- Inversions: 0
- Duration: 1:55
- Height restriction: 107 cm (3 ft 6 in)
- Trains: single car trains trains with a single car; riders arranged 2 across in 2 rows for a total of 4 riders per train
- Theme: Finding Nemo
- Audio-animatronics: 1
- Restraints: Individual lap block
- Disney Premier Access available
- Single rider line available
- Must transfer from wheelchair
- Crush's Coaster at RCDB

Crush's Coaster is a spinning roller coaster at Disney Adventure World in Disneyland Paris. The attraction officially opened on June 9, 2007 as part of an expansion project in Toon Studio, an area within Walt Disney Studios Park formerly known as Animation Courtyard. The ride is themed to Disney-Pixar's Finding Nemo film, and named after Crush, a green sea turtle voiced by Andrew Stanton from the movie. Most of the roller coaster is enclosed and features dark ride special effects.

On August 27, 2021, following Disneyland Paris' reopening, Walt Disney Studios Park announced that the attraction was set to become part of the Worlds of Pixar area.

== History ==
Disneyland Paris – known as Disneyland Resort Paris at the time – began a placemaking project as early as 2006 to improve and expand the Animation Courtyard area within Walt Disney Studios Park. The project was completed in 2007, and the area was renamed Toon Studio. No official press announcement was given until the launch of the resort's 15th Anniversary Celebration on April 1, 2007. The ride then debuted on June 9, 2007 and is the first and only ride at Disneyland Paris to be themed to Finding Nemo.

On Halloween night in 2010, Walt Disney Studios Park was rethemed for the holiday, with most of its popular attractions receiving a halloween re-theming. Crush's Coaster became Crush's Coaster: Avis de Tempête as part of the festivities.

== Ride experience ==
Loading area for Crush's Coaster

=== Queue ===
Guests enter the Toon Backlot of Toon Studio and stumble upon the beached sound stage and film set of Disney·Pixar's Finding Nemo, themed as Sydney Harbour, where Crush and his sea friends invite guests to climb aboard turtle shells for a ride through memorable scenes from the movie.

=== Ride ===
The ride starts off with shells "diving" into the ocean. The first part of the attraction is a slow dark ride taking guests to the Great Barrier Reef, where they meet Nemo and Squirt, then to the darkness of the depths, where they encounter voracious glowfish, and finally to the Sunken Submarine surrounded by an army of jellyfish where they meet the sharks and their chief, Bruce.

The second part of the ride's track is a faster rollercoaster in the dark, representing the spiraling, churning East Australian Current itself. The ride ends with the shells returning to Sydney Harbour, with cheers from Crush and his friends.

== Technology ==
Coaster track leaves the building

The attraction employs several instances of new technology developed by Walt Disney Imagineering, the key being two large digital video projection effects in the early dark ride scenes of the ride, which place Nemo, the clownfish, and Squirt, Crush's son, seamlessly within the 'underwater' environment. The technology was developed for Crush's Coaster in conjunction with Finding Nemo Submarine Voyage and The Seas with Nemo and Friends. Crush's Coaster marks the only second Disney-themed spinning roller coaster (following Primeval Whirl at Disney's Animal Kingdom), and the first ever collaboration between German roller coaster engineers Maurer Söhne and Walt Disney Imagineering.

== Fastpass ==
In a bid to decrease the long queues that frequently plague the ride, Disney conducted preliminary tests during July 2008 at the Crush's Coaster site to investigate the possibility of installing a Fastpass system at the attraction. Fastpass was ultimately not implemented at the ride, though a single riders line subsequently was.

Fastpass was again trialed in January 2018. Crush's Coaster is now part of Disney Premier Access, a paid Fastpass service.
