= Bistrot Chez Rémy =

Themed restaurant at Disney's Adventure World

- Interactive map of Bistrot Chez Rémy

Restaurant information
- Established: July 10, 2014
- Location: Marne-la-Vallée, France
- Coordinates: 48.867438°N 2.776008°E

Bistrot Chez Rémy is a themed restaurant located in the Place de Rémy area of Disney Adventure World at the Disneyland Paris resort in Marne-la-Vallée, France. It is themed after the 2007 film Ratatouille and located directly across from the Ratatouille: L'Aventure Totalement Toquée de Rémy dark ride.

== Overview ==
Bistrot Chez Remy is designed with enlarged surroundings to give those visiting the illusion that they are the size of rats. The interior is made up of items including plates, bottles, and silverware. Multi-course meals are served there with options including salad, soup, fish, ratatouille (akin to the film), steak, and chicken, with chocolate mousse and cheesecake available as dessert.

The restaurant, which opened on July 10, 2014, was a collaboration with French chef Paul Bocuse, who had previously worked with Disney on the Les Chefs de France restaurant in Epcot. It is known to be especially popular, with dinner reservations sometimes being completely booked out months ahead of time.

Jane Knight of The Times stated it "served the best food ... [they had] ever eaten in an amusement park.", while Nick DiGiovanni called it "one of those restaurants where you can't help but look around the room before even opening the menu.", feeling it was home to "one of the most memorable meals" in the park.
