= The Magic Carpets of Aladdin =

Ride type in Disney theme parks

- Magic Kingdom attraction logo

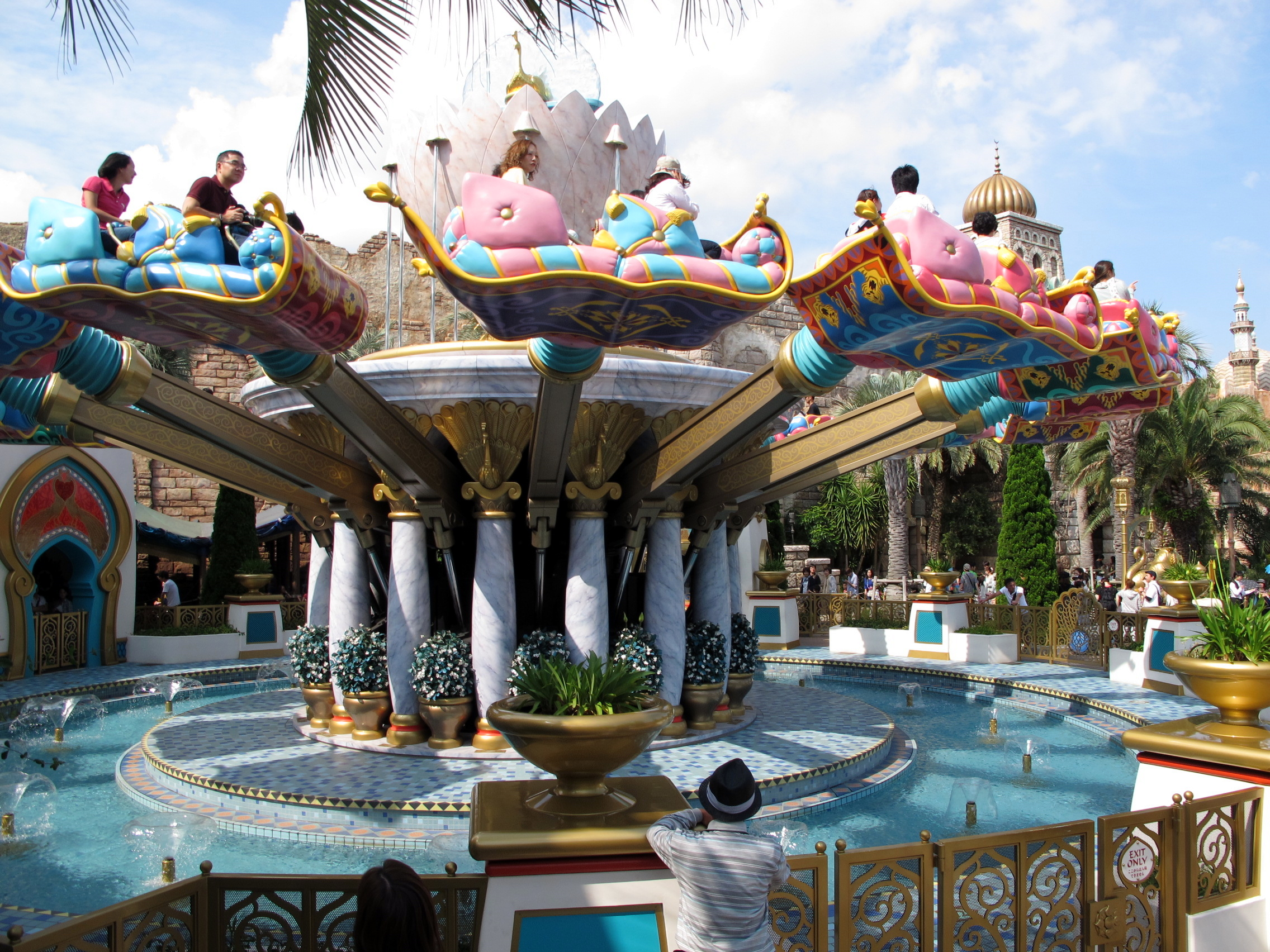
- Jasmine's Flying Carpets at Tokyo DisneySea

Magic Kingdom
- Area: Adventureland
- Status: Operating
- Opening date: May 23, 2001
- Lightning Lane available

Disney Adventure World
- Name: Les Tapis Volants - Flying Carpets Over Agrabah
- Area: Toon Studio (2002–2025); World Premiere Plaza (2025–present)
- Status: Operating
- Opening date: March 16, 2002

Tokyo DisneySea
- Name: Jasmine's Flying Carpets
- Area: Arabian Coast
- Status: Operating
- Opening date: July 18, 2011

Ride statistics
- Attraction type: Aerial Carousel
- Manufacturer: Zamperla
- Designer: Walt Disney Imagineering
- Theme: Aladdin
- Vehicle type: Flying carpets
- Duration: 1:30
- Host: Aladdin
- Wheelchair accessible

The Magic Carpets of Aladdin is a ride in the Magic Kingdom, at Walt Disney World. It is based on the 1992 film, Aladdin. It is similar to the Dumbo the Flying Elephant attraction in that riders in the front rows control how high their carpets fly, and the ride lasts about 90 seconds. At the entrance, a camel statue squirts guests as they walk by, much like the Stitch figurine outside the World of Disney store.

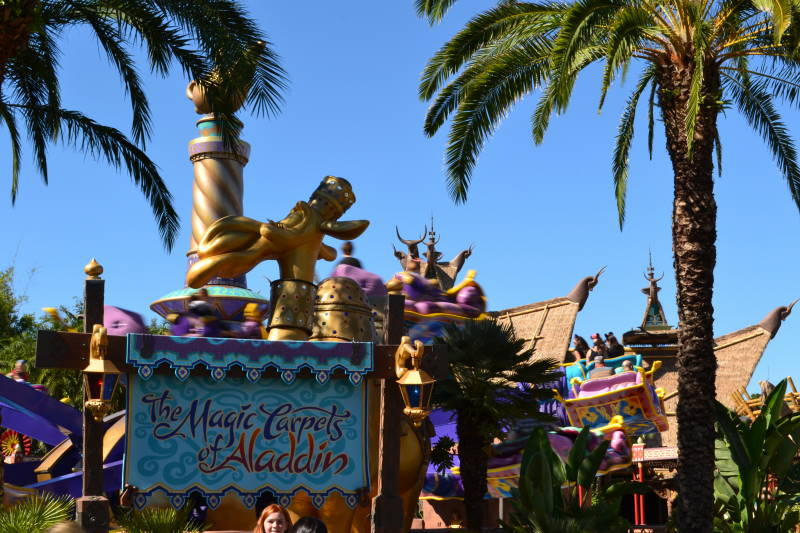
Attraction at Magic Kingdom at Walt Disney World.

The shops near this attraction are themed to Agrabah's marketplace from the film, and Aladdin, Jasmine and the Genie are often available for meet-and-greets in the nearby buildings.

== Related attractions ==
The attraction opened in time with the debut of Disney Adventure World in Disneyland Paris on March 16, 2002, as Flying Carpets Over Agrabah. The attraction is set against a large "movie set" backdrop of Agrabah, with guests playing as the extras in Genie's directorial debut. This is the last ride which opened on the opening day of the park which is still operating.

A third version of the attraction opened at Tokyo DisneySea in Tokyo Disney Resort on July 18, 2011, as Jasmine's Flying Carpets. The attraction is next to Sindbad's Storybook Voyage.
