= Cars Quatre Roues Rallye =

Attraction at Walt Disney Studios Park

Walt Disney Studios Park
- Area: Worlds of Pixar
- Status: Operating
- Opening date: June 9, 2007

Ride statistics
- Manufacturer: Zamperla
- Designer: Walt Disney Imagineering
- Model: Demolition Derby
- Theme: Cars
- Music: Randy Newman
- Capacity: 650 riders per hour
- Vehicles: 12
- Riders per vehicle: 4
- Rows: 2
- Riders per row: 2
- Duration: 1:30
- Hosts: Lightning McQueen & Tow Mater
- Must transfer from wheelchair

Cars Quatre Roues Rallye, or Cars Race Rally, is an attraction at Walt Disney Studios Park at Disneyland Paris in Marne-la-Vallée. The attraction opened on June 9, 2007, as part of the park's expansion land, Toon Studio (now known as Worlds of Pixar). The attraction's theme is based on Pixar's Cars franchise. On August 27, 2021, following Disneyland Paris' reopening, Walt Disney Studios announced that the attraction was set to become part of the Worlds of Pixar area.

== Summary ==
The attraction is located in Toon Studio and themed as an automobile service station in Radiator Springs. The attraction is surrounded by boulders which imitate the rocky formations of the Grand Canyon.

Similar to The Whirlpool at Tokyo DisneySea, the ride system is a standard 2-table Zamperla Demolition Derby. The vehicles automatically change from one spinning turntable to the next while interweaving and switching places with the other vehicles.

This attraction eventually led to the Walt Disney Imagineering creating a custom-made 4-table version with modified swinging vehicles at several DisneyParks, including: Mater's Junkyard Jamboree, Alien Swirling Saucers, and The Happy Ride with Baymax.
