= Studio Tram Tour: Behind the Magic =

Defunct attraction

Disney Adventure World
- Area: Production Courtyard
- Status: Removed
- Opening date: March 16, 2002
- Closing date: January 6, 2020
- Replaced by: Cars: Road Trip (Worlds of Pixar); The Lion King Area; Adventure Way; World of Frozen

Ride statistics
- Attraction type: Tram Tour
- Designer: Walt Disney Imagineering
- Theme: Backlot tour of a working film studio
- Vehicle type: Tram
- Wheelchair accessible
- Assistive listening available
- Closed captioning available

Studio Tram Tour: Behind the Magic was an attraction at Disney Adventure World, Disneyland Paris. It premiered with the grand opening of the park on March 16, 2002. The attraction closed on January 5, 2020, to be replaced by a new Cars themed attraction and make way for the €2 billion multi-year expansion plan at Walt Disney Studios Park.

== History ==
Disney Imagineers wanted to create a studio tour at the Walt Disney Studios Park, similar to the former Studio Backlot Tour at Disney's Hollywood Studios in Florida, where the tour was once the park's signature attraction.

The attraction opened on March 16, 2002, being one of the park's debut attractions.

In 2005, the Italian, Dutch, German and Spanish languages were all discontinued. Two years later in 2007, the entrance sign was replaced, changing from the original billboard signage to a Hollywood Hills tunnel facade.

=== Closure ===
On 14 October 2019, Disneyland Paris announced that the tram tour would be replaced by a new attraction based on Pixar’s Cars franchise. This came following the announcement by Disney CEO Bob Iger of a €2 billion expansion plan for Walt Disney Studios Park in February 2018, marking a shift towards immersive franchise-based lands rather than the studio-backlot theme the park was known for. The attraction's last operating day was January 5, 2020; the ride then closed January 6.

While most of the former ride was dismantled, the large-scale "Catastrophe Canyon" effects sequence was retained and incorporated into Cars: Road Trip, the replacement of the Studio Tram Tour.

== Ride ==
=== Ride layout ===
Guests enter the attraction via the Hollywood Boulevard section of the park, under a false façade of the Hollywood sign. The tram ride portion of the attraction features highlights such as the Catastrophe Canyon scene and a look into the set of London in ruins from the film Reign of Fire.

=== Narration ===
The tour was guided by a bilingual video featuring Jeremy Irons and Irène Jacob. Until 2005, two other bilingual videos were occasionally used, hosted by Isabella Rossellini and Famke Janssen, and Inés Sastre and Nastassja Kinski, respectfully.

== See also ==
- Studio Backlot Tour (former counterpart tram tour at Disney's Hollywood Studios, Walt Disney World)
