= Barrel of Monkeys =

Toy game

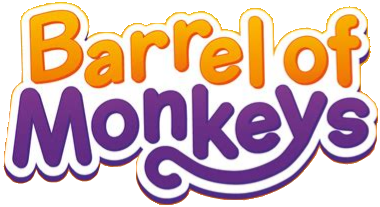
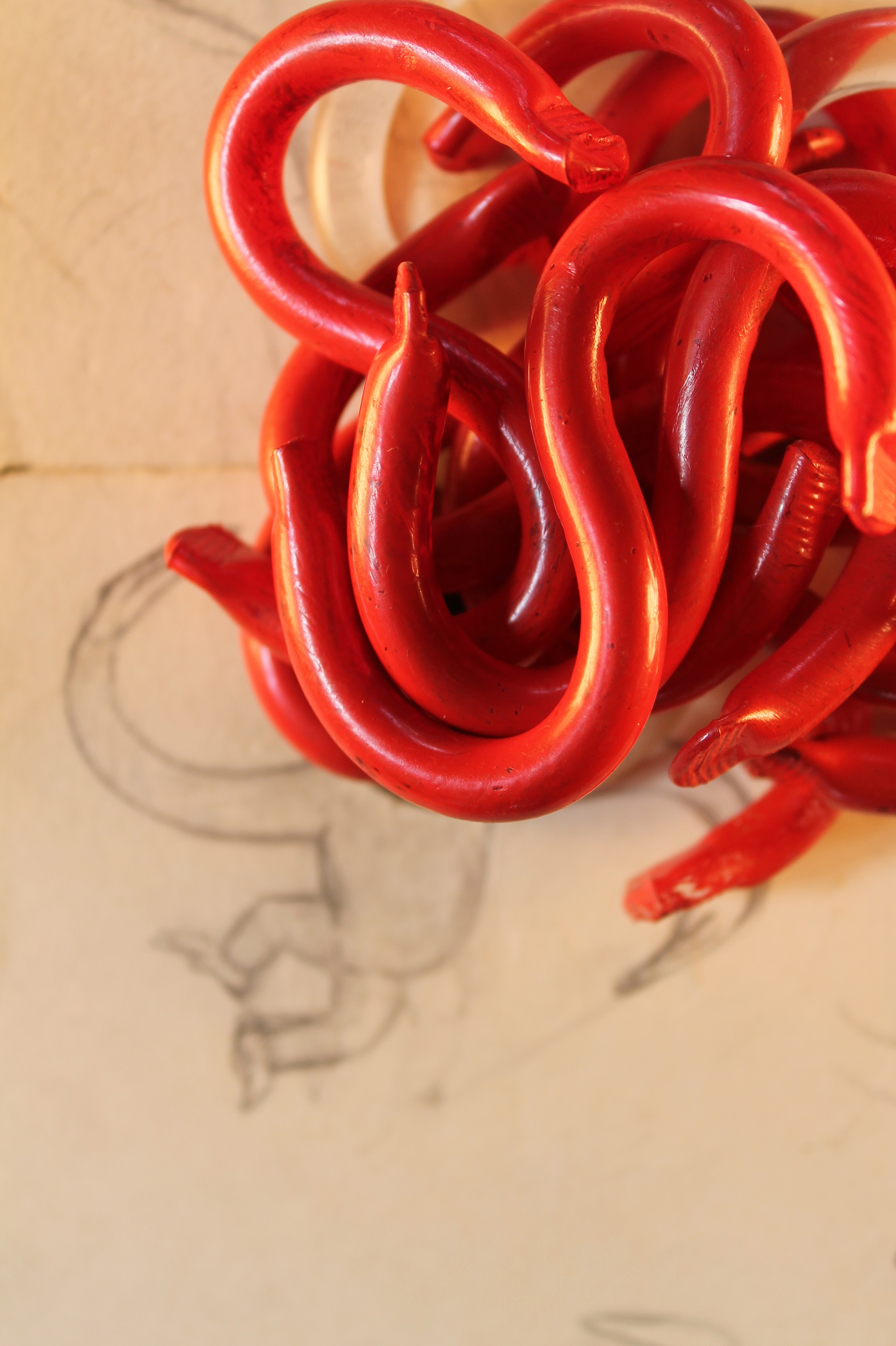
- Barrel Of Monkeys original drawing and links
- Type: Toy
- Invented by: Leonard Marks; Milton Dinhofer
- Company: Lakeside Toys (1965); Milton Bradley; Hasbro (1988–present)
- Country: United States
- Availability: 1965–present
- Materials: Plastic

Barrel of Monkeys is a toy game released by Lakeside Toys in 1965. It was created by Leonard Marks and Milton Dinhofer in 1961, and in 1964, Herman Kesler partnered to sell it to Lakeside Toys, which released it in 1965. It was then produced by the Milton Bradley Company and Hasbro. Milton Bradley's editions consisted of a toy barrel in either blue, yellow, red, purple, orange, gray, or green. The barrel contains 13 monkeys but can hold 24, their color usually corresponding to the barrel's color. The instructions state, "Dump monkeys onto table. Pick up one monkey by an arm. Hook other arm through a second monkey's arm. Continue making a chain. Your turn is over when a monkey is dropped." In addition to these basic instructions, the barrel also contains instructions for playing alone or with two or more players.

Time magazine ranked Barrel of Monkeys at No. 53 on their 2011 All-Time 100 Greatest Toys list.

== History ==
In 1961, a greeting cards salesman, Leonard Marks, was in a small shop to sell his line of cards. As he waited for Robert Gilbert, the shop owner, he fiddled with an open box of snow-tire-replacement chain links. Marks became so engrossed in playing, he did not realize how much time had passed. He told Gilbert that the links would make a great toy, and Gilbert referred Marks to Milton Dinhofer, a toy inventor in the area. Marks already knew Dinhofer from high school and reached out to him to meet. Dinhofer asked Marks to make a plastic sample of the hooks for their meeting.

Milton Dinhofer was a graduate of Rensselaer Polytechnic Institute and a successful importer who already had two toy successes to his credit. He created the first full-size wearable toy space helmet which made the covers of both The Saturday Evening Post (November 8, 1952) and Collier's magazine (April 18, 1953). He also designed and brought to market Sip-n-See. Sip-n-See was the first mass-produced twisted plastic drinking straw. The straws had different characters on them, and it was the s-shaped arms of his cowboy straw that inspired the shape of the monkeys's arms.

When Marks met Dinhofer at his home in Roslyn, New York, he brought a pile of red, s-shaped hooks made from 1/4" plastic rod. Dinhofer immediately imagined monkeys having arms positioned like his cowboy character. Marks and Dinhofer formed a partnership and decided that Dinhofer would design the toy, and Marks would sell it. It took Dinhofer three months to go from sketch to functional monkey. He made a sketch for a face and one for a body, but the biggest challenge was the monkey's balance. Once that was achieved, Dinhofer hired A. Santore of A. S. Plastic Model Company to carve a sample under his supervision. Dinhofer then searched for a beryllium-mold maker which was a challenge and expensive as working with plastic was still relatively new. The initial run of monkeys were in many assorted colors, but their shape was just like those Lakeside released in 1965. Lakeside would eventually add a little more hair to the bodies and decades later change the designs completely. Before Lakeside, the prototype was called Chimp to Chimp. Four of its monkeys were yellow, four were green, and four were red. The twelve monkeys allowed three to twelve-year-olds to link them without needing to stand on stools. The Chimp to Chimp prototype came in flat inexpensive packaging which the Woolworth chain offered to carry in their stores. But Woolworth's stipulated that Marks and Dinhofer would have to provide 13 weeks of television advertising which neither could afford. No other buyers were found. Then, in 1964, Herman Kesler agreed to join the partnership and pitch Barrel of Monkeys to Lakeside Toys where he had connections.

In November of that year, Kesler met with Zelman Levine, the CEO and President of Lakeside Toys, at the Essex House in New York City. Also present were Lakeside's vice president, James R. Becker, who would eventually become president, and Stanley Harfenist, Lakeside's future General Manager who was in the process of bringing Gumby to Lakeside. Kesler walked into Levine's room, dropped the monkeys on the table and began to link them together. Becker said it was during the meeting that he brought up the phrase, "more fun than a barrel of monkeys." Levine immediately approved the toy and took all the samples back with him to his headquarters in Minneapolis. Barrel of Monkeys was quickly released in 1965 as a Lakeside toy allowing Marks, Dinhofer, and Kesler to receive ongoing royalties. The game was first packaged in a cardboard tube, like Lakeside's successful game Pick-Up-Sticks, but with a plastic monkey attached to the lid. The monkeys easily broke off the packaging and, in 1966, a two-piece plastic barrel was introduced. In April 1967, the game was #2 on Toy and Hobby World's Toy Hit Parade chart.

Lakeside Toys was eventually sold to Leisure Dynamics, Inc. in 1969. Leisure was sold to Coleco Industries in 1985, and Coleco was sold to Hasbro Inc. in 1988. The current Hasbro version is sold with ten newly designed monkeys in the barrel.

Unlike the later mono-colored Giant Barrel of Monkeys, the original version included 12 plastic monkeys in three colors; four each in red, blue, and yellow.

== Use in models ==
These Monkeys have also been used for modeling of polyhedral structures, including virus particles and other protein structures. In brief, a pair of monkeys can hook around each other in more than eighty different ways, forming quite stable links. The links may be either symmetrical or asymmetrical. Repetition of an asymmetric link generates a helix. A symmetric link is self-limiting, so that the structure cannot grow further unless a new link is used to join symmetric pairs. It is possible to generate structures with point, line, 2D, or 3D symmetry by choosing two or three different links (from the 80 or more possibilities) and repeating them systematically. An enormous number of compatible combinations can be found by trial and error.

Any repeating unit can, in principle, be assembled in this way. The only unusual characteristic of the monkey is that its arms, legs, hands, and feet are able to twist around each other to form many stable links. In this, they resemble protein molecules which can also link together in many ways. The resulting assemblies simulate biologically important structures, but their symmetry follows general geometric principles. The monkeys provide a 'hands on' approach to understanding these principles. Barrel of Monkeys is also called Bandar Keela and is famous in south Asian countries.

== Media appearances ==
- A Barrel of Monkeys set appears in the Toy Story series of animated films, in which toys are depicted as sentient creatures that pretend to be lifeless when humans are present. In the films, the monkey toys belonged to the character Andy during his childhood.
  - Oversized prop Barrel of Monkeys can also be seen in Toy Story Land.
- In May 2012, Dartmouth College student Parker Phinney led a fundraising group that built a chain of 5,990 monkeys, the longest ever.
- In the game show Family Game Night, a show featuring many Hasbro-owned game brands, families play the game for a prize by arranging the chains of monkeys from shortest to longest.
- The logos and posters for the 12 Monkeys 1995 film and 2015 TV series borrow Barrel of Monkeys imagery.
- In 2023 a Barrel of Monkeys had es brief appearance in the pilot episode of The Amazing Digital Circus
