= World of Frozen =

Themed area at three Disney parks

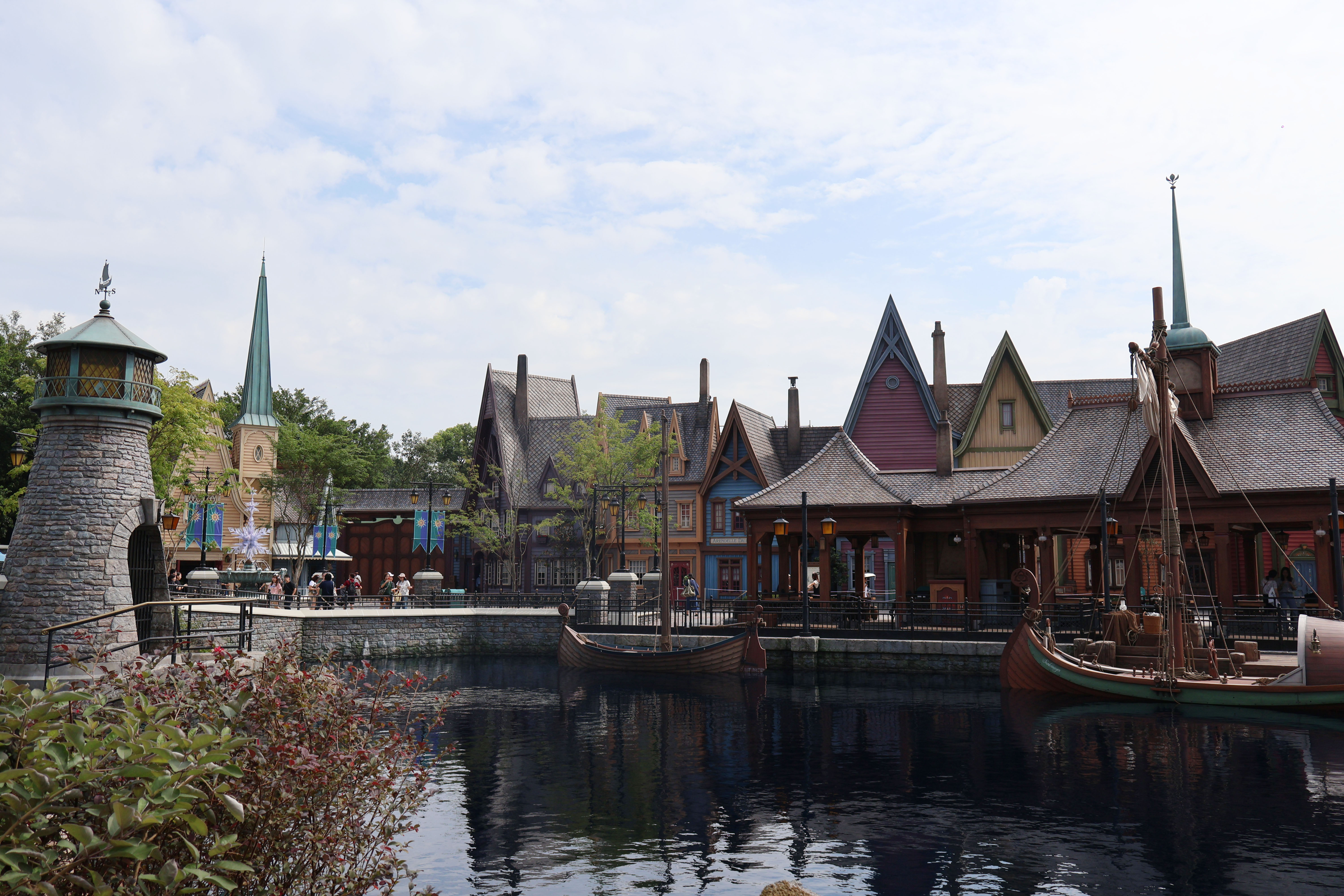
- World of Frozen in Hong Kong Disneyland
- Interactive map of World of Frozen
- Theme: Frozen

Hong Kong Disneyland
- Status: Operating
- Opened: November 20, 2023
- Replaced: Disney in the Stars Fireworks Launch Area; Fantasy Gardens Heart Gazebo

Disney Adventure World
- Status: Operating
- Opened: March 29, 2026
- Replaced: Studio Tram Tour: Behind the Magic (Production Courtyard)

World of Frozen is a themed area based on the Frozen franchise. The land opened at Hong Kong Disneyland on November 20, 2023 and Disney Adventure World on March 29, 2026.

== Storyline ==
Set after the events of Frozen and before Frozen 2, peace and prosperity has finally returned to the kingdom of Arendelle and Queen Elsa has decreed a Summer Snow Day for the merriment of the kingdom's citizens.

== Locations ==
=== Hong Kong Disneyland ===
On November 22, 2016, The Walt Disney Company and the Hong Kong Government announced plans for a multi-year, HK$10.9 billion expansion of Hong Kong Disneyland. The proposed expansion included World of Frozen, Castle of Magical Dreams, multiple new attractions and live entertainment.

The land would be the fourth expansion that opened as part of the park's multi-year expansion from 2018 to 2023. It opened on November 20, 2023 and is located between It's a Small World (in Fantasyland) and Toy Story Land, which is in honor of the film's 10th-anniversary celebration and part of the Disney 100 Years of Wonder celebration. It officially opened to the public on the 20th of November 2023.

=== Disney Adventure World ===
On February 27, 2018, the chairman and CEO of The Walt Disney Company Bob Iger announced plans for a 2 billion euro and multi-year expansion for Disneyland Paris alongside French President Emmanuel Macron at the Palais de l'Elysée in Paris. The multi-year expansion will also include the transformation of the Disney Adventure World. Aside from Kingdom of Arendelle, the park received the Avengers Campus, along with multiple new attractions and live entertainment experiences.

The opening of the new immersive area World of Frozen is announced for March 29, 2026, the date on which Walt Disney Studio Park will be renamed Disney Adventure World. It will host a life-sized reconstruction of the Kingdom of Arendelle with a 36-meter high mountain, a boat ride (Frozen Ever After), and a daytime show on the fjord. The area will offer a meet-and-greet with Queens Anna and Elsa in their castle, and "true-to-size" Olaf made possible by new robotics technology.

In October 2026, it was announced that the show was temporarily on hiatus until April 2, 2027 and it was replaced by a new 7-minute holiday show, "Rings in the Seasons with Anna and Elsa", which will run for a multiple times a day from November 7, 2026 to January 6, 2027 as part of Disney Enchanted Christmas at Disney Adventure World.

== Attractions ==
- Frozen Ever After (Hong Kong Disneyland/Disney Adventure World)
- Wandering Oaken's Sliding Sleighs (Hong Kong Disneyland)
- Playhouse in the Woods (Hong Kong Disneyland)

== Entertainment ==
=== Hong Kong Disneyland ===
- Playhouse in the Woods

=== Disney Adventure World ===
- A Celebration in Arendelle

== Characters ==
- Elsa
- Anna
- Kristoff
- Oaken

== Restaurants ==
=== Hong Kong Disneyland ===
- Golden Crocus Inn
- Northern Delights
- Forest Fare

=== Disney Adventure World ===
- Nordic Crowns Tavern

== Shops ==
=== Hong Kong Disneyland ===
- Tick Tock Toys and Collectibles
- Northern Delights
- Traveling Traders

=== Disney Adventure World ===
- Arendelle Boutique
- Fjord View Shop

== See also ==
- Epcot's Norway Pavilion, where Frozen Ever After debuted.
- Fantasy Springs, a themed port at Tokyo DisneySea.
- Pandora – The World of Avatar, a themed land at Disney's Animal Kingdom.
- Avengers Campus, a Marvel Cinematic Universe themed land at Disney California Adventure and Disney Adventure World.
- Star Wars: Galaxy's Edge, a Star Wars themed land at Disneyland Park and Disney's Hollywood Studios.
