= Art of Disney Animation =

Attraction at three Disney parks

Animation Celebration

Disney Adventure World
- Area: Toon Studio (2002–2025); World Premiere Plaza (2025–present)
- Coordinates: 48°52′2.22″N 2°46′42.67″E
- Status: Operating
- Opening date: March 16, 2002 (original); November 17, 2019 (reopened)
- Closing date: January 7, 2019 (original)

Disney California Adventure
- Name: Animation Academy
- Area: Hollywood Land
- Status: Operating
- Opening date: February 8, 2001

Hong Kong Disneyland
- Name: Animation Academy
- Area: Main Street U.S.A.
- Status: Operating
- Opening date: July 14, 2007

Ride statistics
- Attraction type: Walkthrough
- Theme: Disney and Pixar Animation
- Sponsor: Pritt (Paris; 2026–present)

Art of Disney Animation (also known as Disney Animation, Animation Building, or Art of Animation) is an attraction at the Disney California Adventure in Disneyland Resort and Hong Kong Disneyland in Hong Kong Disneyland Resort. In Walt Disney Studios Park (under the name Art of Disney Animation, than renamed as Animation Celebration), the attraction opened on March 16, 2002 in the section of World Premiere Plaza (previously known as Animation Courtyard and the Toon Studio area), but was closed on January 7, 2019. It was reopened on November 17, 2019.

== Synopsis ==
The Art of Disney Animation allows guests to learn about Disney creations with the help of a Disney animator and Mushu, the mischievous dragon from Disney's 1998 film Mulan. Through combining theatre presentations with interactive exhibits, the Art of Disney Animation takes guests on a trip from the historical world of previous Disney animation techniques to "the creation of modern-day Disney characters." The iconic Sorcerer's Hat is the perfect way to usher guests into the building and start this experience. Additionally, in front of the building near the wait area, there is a collection of golden statues of various Disney characters such as Mickey Mouse, Dumbo, Mulan and Donald Duck to name a few.

After guests pass the outdoor wait area, they enter the pre-show room. "A colorful mural wraps around the left side of the room charting early animation inventions." This room has on display an original multiplane camera which was used in the production of the film Bambi. The attraction also displays other early animation inventions such as the Greek urn that date back to 500 BC as well as the Magic Lantern (1659), an early type of image projector, which was invented in the Netherlands.

Other animation inventions include the English Thaumatrope (1825) which is "a disk or card with a picture on each side. The disc or card is attached to two strings on each side. When flipping the disc or card in a continuity movement from one side to the other, it looks like the two separate pictures merged into one single image." The Phenakistoscope invented in Belgium in 1832 is "a vertical spinning disc with multiple drawings that gave the illusion of a moving picture once it was set in motion." The Zoetrope (1834) is another English invention and "it is a cylinder with slits in the side." Inside the cylinder, a band with images is placed. Once the cylinder is set in motion an illusion of movement is created." The last animation invention featured in this room is the French Praxinoscope (1877) which "improved on the Zoetrope by using an inner circle of mirrors that create a brighter and less crooked picture."

After this exhibition pre-show, guests are taken to the Disney Classics Theatre which is a seated cinema is showing a collection great Disney and Pixar animated moments touching on Disney's themes of love, loss and rebirth. Guests are then moved on to the Drawn to Animation room, where they are welcomed by a Disney animator and their host Mushu, the dragon. Together they explain, how Disney creates its many characters and "how they [bring] them to life on the big screen." At the end of this presentation, guests are shown some scenes from the latest Disney or Pixar animation, the scenes obviously changing with the release of a new animated movie.

Guests are then moved into the final and largest room of the attraction, which features a series of interactive "animation stations", where they can try out some of the things they had just seen on the tour. Guests have the possibility of trying their hand at drawing Mickey Mouse with the help of an animator who explains the whole process. They can also draw their own Zoetrope animation on bands of paper and test the results on one of the devices. There is also a sound creation game and a voice over game, as well as many other fun stations to explore.

For those who want to see a little bit more of Disney animation history, there is a display of concept art highlighting the design and creation of Disney's films as well as statues displayed behind glass windows. This final room can be entered without visiting the main attraction, allowing guests to return to view certain exhibits and take part in "animation stations" during their visit to the park.

== Similar attractions ==
=== The Magic of Disney Animation ===
The Magic of Disney Animation was a show and tour at Disney's Hollywood Studios, Florida. The first renovations of the attraction was being temporarily closed on July 12, 2015. At the time, it was not announced what would happen to the building and the animators. At December 1st 2015, the building began to be used to house the Star Wars Launch Bay. However, following the announcements, the second renovations of the attraction will be reopen on September 14, 2026, since the entire Animation Courtyard area was being permanently closed and the archway was being demolished on September 25, 2025 and make way for a new land, The Walt Disney Studios Lot.

=== Disney Animation ===
Disney Animation (also known as Animation Building) is an attraction at Hollywood Land in Disney California Adventure, it has no main show but it has attractions in the building.

It features attractions related to this concept. The Animation Academy is where guests can get lessons on how to draw various Disney characters. As part of the park's "Frozen Fun" event, which ran through May 15, 2015, the Academy gave exclusive lessons on how to draw either Olaf or Marshmallow from Frozen.

Other experiences at Disney Animation includes the Animation Courtyard, where guests can see some of the original artwork and the creative process from Disney and Pixar animated films, featuring scenery from the films as well as concept art of the characters.

Another attraction at the building is known as the Character Close-Up which, starting in late December 2014, features a meet and greet with Anna and Elsa from Frozen.

Other attractions include the Sorcerer's Workshop and Turtle Talk with Crush. The Sorcerer's Workshop features the Magic Mirror Realm which features interactive animation exhibits and allows guests to create simple animated drawings. Guests can figure out what "personality most resembles" them in the Beast's Library. Lastly, guests can "gather 'round a window to the Pacific" for a live chat with Crush the turtle from Finding Nemo.

=== Art of Animation ===
Hong Kong Disneyland is where Art of Animation is located. As part of the expansion of the park in summer 2008, the attraction replaced The Disneyland Story presenting How Mickey Mouse Came to Hong Kong.

Behold an exhibition of original Disney artwork and see how an early concept sketch can become an animated character inside the building. View drawings, sculptures, and rare collectibles from more than 80 years of Disney and Pixar cartoons and animated feature films—and learn how Disney artists created and eventually brought to life of Disney characters.

A zoetrope is a device that flashes a series of still images to produce the illusion of motion. Instead of using traditional, one-dimensional drawings, Toy Story Zoetrope, similar to the former Character Close-Up in Disney Animation Building at Disney California Adventure. It features 3-dimensional figures of characters from the Disney•Pixar Toy Story film series—including Woody, Jessie, and Bullseye—to demonstrate how even sculptures can easily become fully animated in the eye of the beholder. As large disks whirl under a flashing strobe light, the Toy Story characters spring to life.

In 2012, since Magic Access Member Service Center (next to City Hall) was under construction, the center has temporarily moved to the building, replaced The Preview Gallery, while the Art of Animation is covered with a curtain whereas guests could enter and visit. However, the building has been temporarily suspended from September 21 to 30, 2016 and October 17 to 25, 2016 for transformation work. It has provided extra functions that serve the Magic Access Members. The old building was replaced by a Meet and Greet attraction known as The Annex.

In 5th anniversary celebration, "The Magic Continues" Preview Gallery was placed inside the building's golden age area, displaying the three new themed area Grizzly Gulch, Mystic Point and Toy Story Land, the expansions at the park. Later, the display had moved to Hong Kong Disneyland Hotel.

Due to its Monstrous Summer event in 2013, the building was converted into Monsters University Administration Building, in conjunction with the release of the film Monsters University. It ran from June 13, 2013. Although the event officially ended on September 1, it continued until October 31, part of the "Disney's Haunted Halloween" event starting from October 4. Due to its “Frozen” Village summer event in 2015, the building was converted into Inside Out Headquarters, in conjunction with the release of the film Inside Out. It ran from July 9, 2015; although the event officially ended on August 30, it continued until September 14. The displays inside the building were all moved to Epcot Character Spot at Epcot since April 2016.

In the 10th anniversary celebration, half of the building (the renaissance age) was converted into Big Hero 6 Headquarters, where guests could meet and greet with Baymax since February 22, 2015, and Hiro Hamada only on June 4 as an atmosphere character. However, it has been closed since June 30.
