= List of Hong Kong Disneyland attractions =

Hong Kong Disneyland is a theme park located at the Hong Kong Disneyland Resort on reclaimed land in Penny's Bay, Lantau Island.

== Main Street, USA ==
=== Attractions and entertainment ===
- Animation Academy
- Momentous
- Hong Kong Disneyland Railroad – Main Street Station
- Main Street Entertainment
- Main Street Vehicles
- Main Street
  - Meet Chip and Dale
  - Meet Goofy
  - Meet Pluto
- Town Square
  - Meet Daisy
  - Meet Donald
  - Meet Mickey and Minnie
- Main Street Cinema
  - Meet Duffy and Friends
- Atmosphere Entertainment at Main Street, USA

=== Former attractions and entertainment ===
- Art of Animation
- The Disneyland Story presenting How Mickey Mouse Came to Hong Kong (2005–2008, re-themed as Art of Animation)
- The Dapper Dans (2007–2008)
- Main Street Haunted Hotel (2007–2011)
- Turtle Talk with Crush (2008)
- Mickey's House (2008–2009)
- High School Musical: LIVE! (2008–2011, re-themed as Lightning McQueen "LIVE"!)
- Tinker Bell's Pixie Dusted Castle (2010–2011)
- "The Magic Continues" Preview Gallery (2011)
- Lightning McQueen "LIVE"! (2011)
- Flights of Fantasy Parade (2011–2020)
- Graves Academy (2012–2014)
- Monsters University Administration Building (2013)
- Royal Princess Garden (2017–2019)

== Fantasyland ==
=== Attractions and entertainment ===
- Cinderella Carousel
- Dumbo the Flying Elephant
- Dream Makers (Walt Disney statue)
- Fairy Tale Forest – presented by PANDORA
  - Meet Tinker Bell at Fairy Tale Forest
- Fantasy Gardens
- Fantasyland Concert Hall
  - Mickey's PhilharMagic
- Hong Kong Disneyland Railroad - Fantasyland Station
- It's a Small World
- Mad Hatter Tea Cups
- The Many Adventures of Winnie the Pooh
- Meet Mirabel Madrigal and Isabela Madrigal from Encanto at Fantasyland
- Snow White Grotto
- Storybook Theater
  - Mickey and the Wondrous Book
- Atmosphere Entertainment at Fantasyland
- The Royal Reception Hall
- Castle of Magical Dreams
- Royal Princess Garden

=== Former attractions and entertainment ===
- The Golden Mickeys (2005–2015)
- Sleeping Beauty Castle and Hub Area (2005–2018)
- Sword in the Stone (attraction) (2005–2023)

== Tomorrowland ==
=== Attractions and entertainment ===
- Orbitron
- Hyperspace Mountain
- Atmosphere Entertainment at Tomorrowland

=== Former attractions and entertainment ===
- Space Mountain (2005–2016)
- Buzz Lightyear Astro Blasters (2005–2017)
  - Meet Buzz Lightyear in Tomorrowland (2005–2017)
- Autopia (2006–2016)
- Stitch Encounter (2006–2016; returned temporarily in 2019 at The Pavilion for an event)
- UFO Zone (2006–2016)
- Jedi Training: Trials of the Temple (2016–2021)
- Star Wars: Command Post (2016–2021)
- Muppet Mobile Lab (2008–2013)

== Stark Expo ==
=== Attractions and entertainment ===
- Ant-Man and the Wasp: Nano Battle
- Iron Man Experience

=== Upcoming attractions and entertainment ===
- Untitled Avengers ride

== Adventureland ==
=== Attractions and entertainment ===
- Theater in the Wild
  - Festival of the Lion King
- Jungle River Cruise
- Karibuni Marketplace
- Liki Tikis
- Jungle Junction
  - Moana: A Homecoming Celebration
- Atmosphere Entertainment at Adventureland
- Tarzan's Treehouse
  - Rafts to Tarzan's Treehouse

=== Former attractions and entertainment ===
- Lucky the Dinosaur (2005–2006)
- Jungle Puppet Carnival (2005–2009)

== Toy Story Land ==
=== Attractions and entertainment ===
- Barrel of Fun
- Cubot in Toy Story Land
- RC Racer
- Slinky Dog Spin
- Toy Soldier Boot Camp
- Toy Soldiers Parachute Drop

=== Upcoming attractions and entertainment ===
- Ultimate Pixar Adventure (Opening in first half of 2027)

== Grizzly Gulch ==
=== Attractions and entertainment ===
- Big Grizzly Mountain Runaway Mine Cars
- Geyser Gulch
- Welcome Wagon Show
- Wild West Photo Fun

== Mystic Point ==
=== Attractions and entertainment ===
- Garden of Wonders
- Mystic Manor
- Mystic Point Freight Depot

== World of Frozen ==
=== Attractions and entertainment ===
- Frozen Ever After
- Wandering Oaken's Sliding Sleighs
- Playhouse in the Woods

== See also ==
- List of Disney attractions
- List of lands at Disney theme parks
