= Toy Soldiers Parachute Drop =

Amusement ride

Coordinates: 48.8671°N 2.7773°E

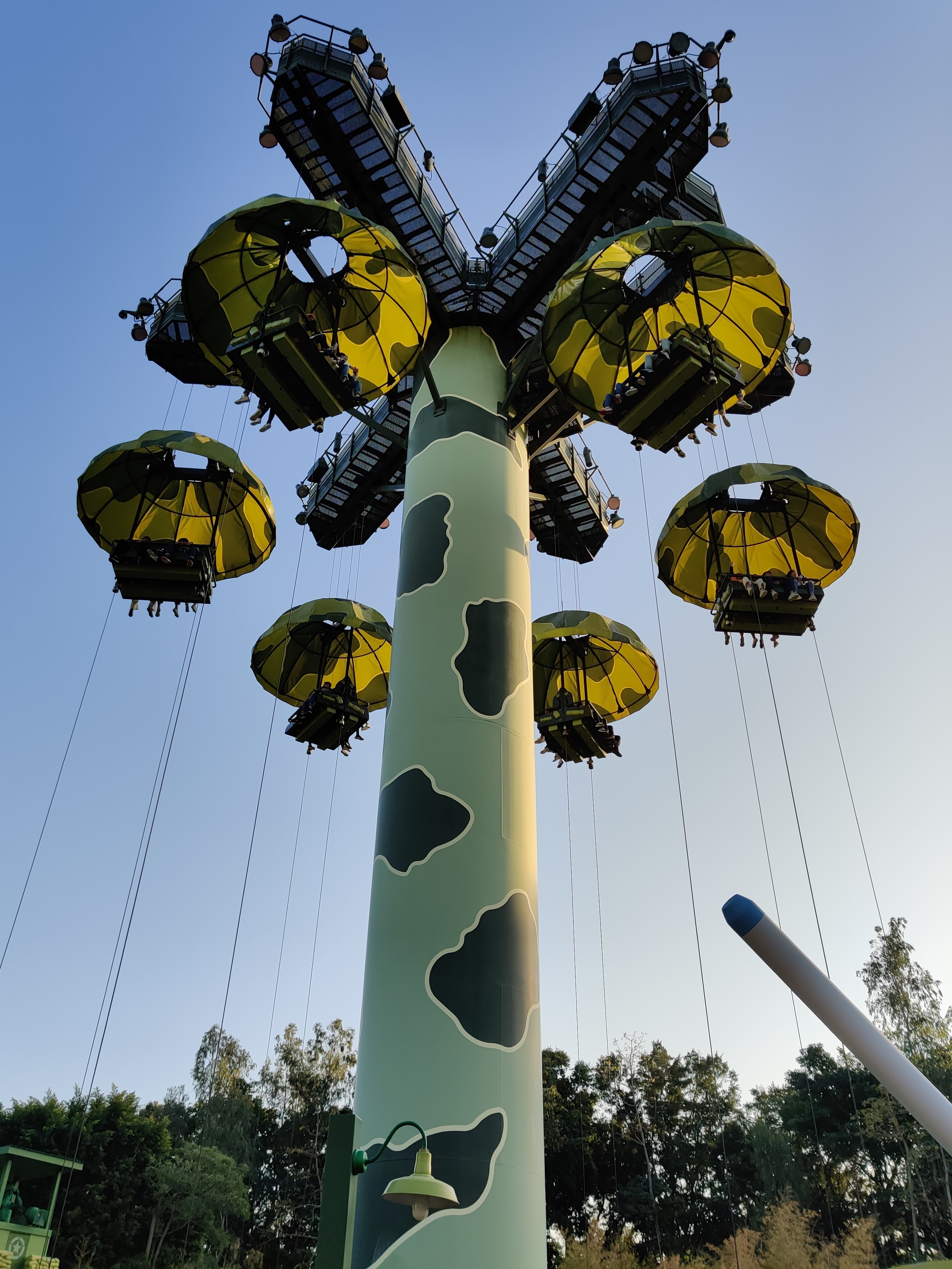
- Toy Soldiers Parachute Drop at Hong Kong Disneyland

Disney Adventure World
- Area: Toy Story Playland
- Status: Operating
- Opening date: August 17, 2010

Hong Kong Disneyland
- Area: Toy Story Land
- Status: Operating
- Opening date: November 17, 2011

Ride statistics
- Attraction type: Paratower, Drop Tower
- Manufacturer: Intamin
- Designer: Walt Disney Imagineering
- Theme: Toy Story
- Vehicle type: Parachutes
- Vehicles: 6
- Single rider line available

Toy Soldiers Parachute Drop is a parachute jump-style ride, at Disney Adventure World in France and Hong Kong Disneyland. The ride is part of the Toy Story Playland in France and Toy Story Land in Hong Kong. The France ride opened on August 17, 2010 while the Hong Kong installation opened on November 17, 2011.

== Summary ==
The attraction is based on a scene in the original Toy Story film where Green Army Men parachute through stair banisters to investigate Andy's birthday presents. Early plans for Disney California Adventure included this ride. Instead, the Maliboomer space-shot attraction was constructed.

Positioned between the Slinky Dog Zigzag Spin and RC Racer, this attraction towers over 80 feet above the park. Guests are hoisted to the top of the tower in six-person "parachutes" before tumbling back to earth in a series of rises and falls that offer a view of the attraction's surroundings.

Theming around the attraction includes: a large-scale Playskool baby monitor, which momentarily comes to life with updates on Andy's presence, a "plastic" look-out tower dug down into the sandy ground, and an army base complete with human-size accessories and toy soldiers.

== See also ==
- Hong Kong Disneyland attraction and entertainment history
- 2011 in amusement parks
- Jumpin' Jellyfish
