= Roundup Rodeo BBQ =

Themed restaurant at Disney's Hollywood Studios

- Interactive map of Roundup Rodeo BBQ

Restaurant information
- Established: March 23, 2023
- Owner: Disney Experiences
- Food type: Barbeque
- Location: Bay Lake, Orange County, Florida, United States
- Coordinates: 28°21′25″N 81°33′43″W

Roundup Rodeo BBQ is a themed restaurant located in the Toy Story Land area of Disney's Hollywood Studios at the Walt Disney World resort. The restaurant opened on March 23, 2023.

== Overview ==
Roundup Rodeo BBQ is located near the entrance of the land and has an outdoor waiting area. Inside, the restaurant is filled with decor featuring characters and items from the Toy Story films, including a large statue of Bo Peep. The story of the restaurant is centered around a rodeo arena built by Andy for his toys in his backyard. The theming is similar to the rest of Toy Story Land. While barbequed meats are the main dish of the three-course meal offered the restaurant's menu at opening also included other items such as biscuits, salads, and macaroni and cheese. Plants based alternatives were also offered in place of meat.

== See also ==
- Woody's Lunch Box, a smaller restaurant also in Toy Story Land
