= Slinky dog =

Slinky Dog may refer to:

- Slinky Dog, a popular toy from the 1950s to 1970s
- Slinky Dog (character), a fictional character in Toy Story based on the toy
- Slinky Dog Dash, roller coaster at Disney World
- Slinky Dog Zigzag Spin, amusement ride at Disney World
