= List of lands at Disney theme parks =

The following table lists which themed 'lands' are present in each of the Disney Experiences around the world. At a Disney Castle park, it is possible to travel through some of the lands on a Steam Train with the exception of Tokyo Disneyland.

Key:

Themed land exists.
Themed land exists under another name.
Themed land is planned or under construction.
Themed land is permanently closed and/or no longer exists.
Themed land does not exist at this location.

	Disneyland Resort		Walt Disney World Resort				Tokyo Disney Resort		Disneyland Paris		Hong Kong Disneyland Resort	Shanghai Disney Resort	Disneyland Resort Abu Dhabi
	Disneyland	Disney California Adventure	Magic Kingdom	Epcot	Disney's Hollywood Studios	Disney's Animal Kingdom	Tokyo Disneyland	Tokyo DisneySea	Disneyland Park (Paris)	Disney Adventure World	Hong Kong Disneyland	Shanghai Disneyland	Disneyland Abu Dhabi
A Bug's Land		Closed September 4, 2018, replaced by Avengers Campus											
Adventureland												Adventure Isle	
Adventure Way													
Africa													
American Waterfront													
Animation Courtyard					Closed September 25, 2025								
Arabian Coast													
Asia													
Avatar Experience													
Avengers Campus AKA Stark Expo										Rolling out in phases beginning in 2022	sub-area of Tomorrowland, final phase to open in TBA		
Backlot										Closed 2020			
Bayou Country													
Bear Country	Closed 1988												
Camp Minnie Mickey						Closed January 5, 2014							
Cars Land													
Condor Flats		Closed January 7, 2015											
Critter Country	Formerly known as Bear Country 1972–1988												
DinoLand U.S.A.						Closed February 2, 2026							
Discovery Island													
Echo Lake													
Fantasyland													
Fantasy Springs													
Frontierland							Westernland				Grizzly Gulch		
Front Lot										Closed 2024			
Future World				Closed 2021									
Gardens of Imagination	Central Plaza	Carthay Circle	Central Plaza				Central Plaza, larger than the Paris and US versions		Central Plaza		Castle Plaza		
Golden State		Closed 2007											
Grand Avenue					Closed June 7, 2025 - replaced by Monstropolis								
Grizzly Peak													
Grizzly Peak Airfield													
Holidayland	Closed September 1961- replaced by New Orleans Square												
Hollywood Boulevard													
Hollywood Land		Formerly known as Hollywood Pictures Backlot											
Liberty Square													
Lost River Delta													
Main Street, U.S.A.							World Bazaar, All covered in a glass rooftop		Features Liberty and Discovery Arcades			Mickey Avenue	
Mediterranean Harbor													
Mermaid Lagoon													
Mickey's Toontown AKA Toontown			Mickey's Toontown Fair, Closed February 11, 2011										
Monstropolis													
Muppet Courtyard					Closed September 28, 2017								
Mysterious Island													
Mystic Point													
New Orleans Square													
The Oasis													
Pacific Wharf		Rethemed as San Fransokyo Square											
Pandora—The World of Avatar													
Paradise Gardens Park													
Paradise Pier		Rethemed as Pixar Pier											
Piston Peak National Park													
Pixar Entertainment Experience													
Pixar Pier					Known as "Pixar Place", Closed on June 30, 2018								
Performance Corridor												Parade Route	
Production Courtyard													
Port Discovery													
Pride Lands													
San Fransokyo Square													
Star Wars: Galaxy's Edge													
Streets of America					Closed April 2, 2016								
Sunset Boulevard													
Sunshine Plaza		Closed August 29, 2011. Re-themed as Buena Vista Street (2012–present)											
Tomorrowland AKA Discoveryland									Discoveryland				
Toon Studio													
Toy Story Land AKA Toy Story Playland										Toy Story Playland, sub-area of Worlds of Pixar (previously sub-area of Toon Studio)			
Treasure Cove													
Tropical Americas						Opening in Fall 2027							
Villains Land													
Walt Disney Studios													
World of Frozen AKA Frozen Kingdom								sub-area of Fantasy Springs					
World Showcase													
World Nature													
World Celebration													
World Discovery													
Worlds of Pixar		Pixar Pier											
World Premiere Plaza													
Zootopia													

== See also ==
- List of Disney theme park attractions
