= Slinky Dog Dash =

Roller coaster at Disney World

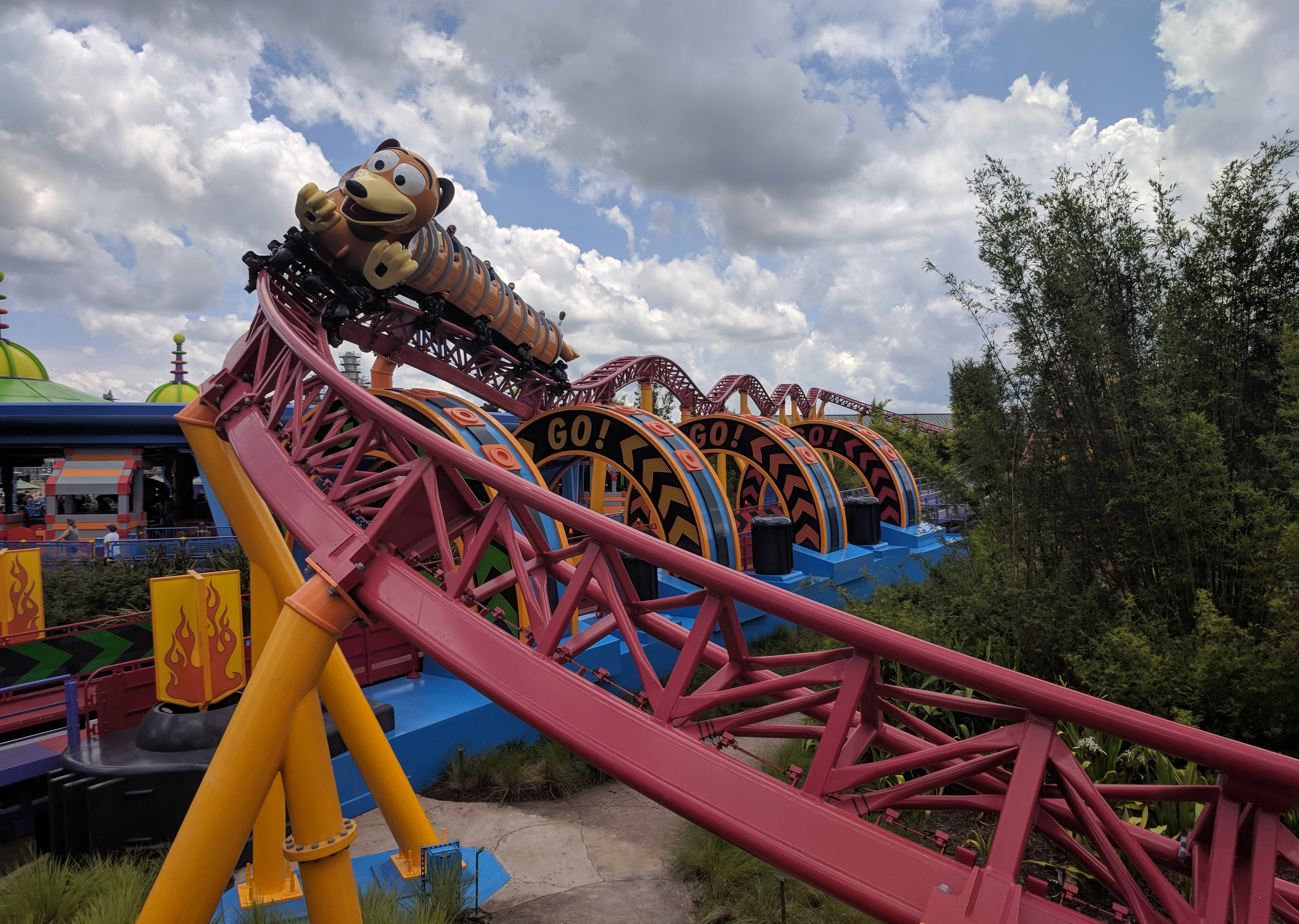

Disney's Hollywood Studios
- Location: Disney's Hollywood Studios
- Park section: Toy Story Land
- Coordinates: 28°21′33.9″N 81°33′38.5″W
- Status: Operating
- Soft opening date: June 29, 2018
- Opening date: June 30, 2018
- Replaced: Earffel Tower (Studio Backlot)

General statistics
- Type: Steel – Family – Launched
- Manufacturer: Mack Rides
- Designer: Walt Disney Imagineering
- Height: 50 ft (15 m)
- Speed: 40 mph (64 km/h)
- Inversions: 0
- Duration: 2 minutes
- Height restriction: 38 in (97 cm)
- Theme: Slinky Dog (Toy Story)
- Launches: 2
- Trains: 4 trains with five cars. Riders are arranged 2 across in 2 rows (except for the last car, which has a single row), for a total of 18 riders per train.
- Lightning Lane Available
- Must transfer from wheelchair
- Slinky Dog Dash at RCDB

Slinky Dog Dash is a family launched roller coaster, located within Toy Story Land at Disney's Hollywood Studios, that opened on June 30, 2018.

Themed around the Slinky Dog character from the Toy Story films, the story of the ride is that Andy has built a roller coaster using his "Dash & Dodge Mega Coaster Kit" and decided to use Slinky Dog as the ride vehicle. The ride can accommodate up to four trains at a time.

The attraction concludes with a performance by the first ever audio-animatronic Wheezy the Penguin, who serenades guests at the Big Finale on the final brake run. Wheezy's singing on the ride was voiced by actor Sean Kenin.

== History ==
In August 2015 at the D23 Expo, it was announced that Toy Story Land would be added to Disney's Hollywood Studios. There would be two new attractions in the area: Slinky Dog Dash and Alien Swirling Saucers. Slinky Dog Dash would be the park's second roller coaster, after Rock 'n' Roller Coaster Starring Aerosmith.

Construction of Slinky Dog Dash began in 2016, alongside Toy Story Land and Star Wars: Galaxy's Edge. The track layout was finished on August 1, 2017. Later that month, the ride vehicle arrived at the park. The ride performed its first test runs in September 2017.

On June 30, 2018, Slinky Dog Dash opened to guests, along with Toy Story Land. In January 2019, the tails on the back of each train were briefly removed for safety inspection. They returned a few weeks later.

== Ride experience ==
=== Queue ===
Guests enter the queue by either taking the stand-by or Lightning Lane entrances. The stand-by entrance sign is a gold medallion that belongs to Buster's collar, revealing the address 234 Elm Street on the back. As guests make their way through the queue, guests pass by numerous toys and pathways. Some sections of the outdoor portion including an extended queue area received a permanent shade structure in September 2019. In the shaded switchback section, there are some crafting materials, such as a bottle of Elmers Glue and a box of Crayola crayons. Guests can spot Andy's schematics sketched on notebook paper and other school supplies. There are some screens that show the safety instructions. The pathway passes by cards and blocks. The walls even feature stickers, with one of them being a reference to Triple R Ranch. Guests then reach the station, where they board the train. On the ceiling there is a game of tic-tac-toe in which the X's win.

=== Layout ===
The train exits the station and makes a right turn into the first launch. Riders hit a left turn and go over a smaller airtime hill. The train races through Andy's yard, going through a frame built out of blocks, with Jessie clinging to it. The train then moves through a left-handed helix. Guests then dip into an archway of blocks and turn left. Along the way, riders can spot more scenery, a tower of Jenga blocks with Rex on top. After a right turn, the train goes through a block tunnel and slows down. It stops at the second launch and the countdown begins. Riders are then launched through a series of GO! rings as the train passes the on-ride camera, which takes photos of the guests. The train makes its way through an airtime hill and a left turn. Guests go through a series of bunny hills and another left turn. Passing by some blocks, the train makes a right turn. Riders hit the final brake run and spot a Wheezy animatronic on the right singing "You've Got a Friend in Me". Following this, the train returns to the station, where riders exit the ride.
