= Woody's Lunch Box =

Restaurant at Disney's Hollywood Studios

Coordinates: 28.3557°N 81.5622°W

Woody's Lunch Box is a counter service restaurant located in the Toy Story Land area of Disney's Hollywood Studios at the Walt Disney World resort. The restaurant primarily serves sandwiches.
