= Wandering Oaken's Sliding Sleighs =

Disney roller coaster in Hong Kong

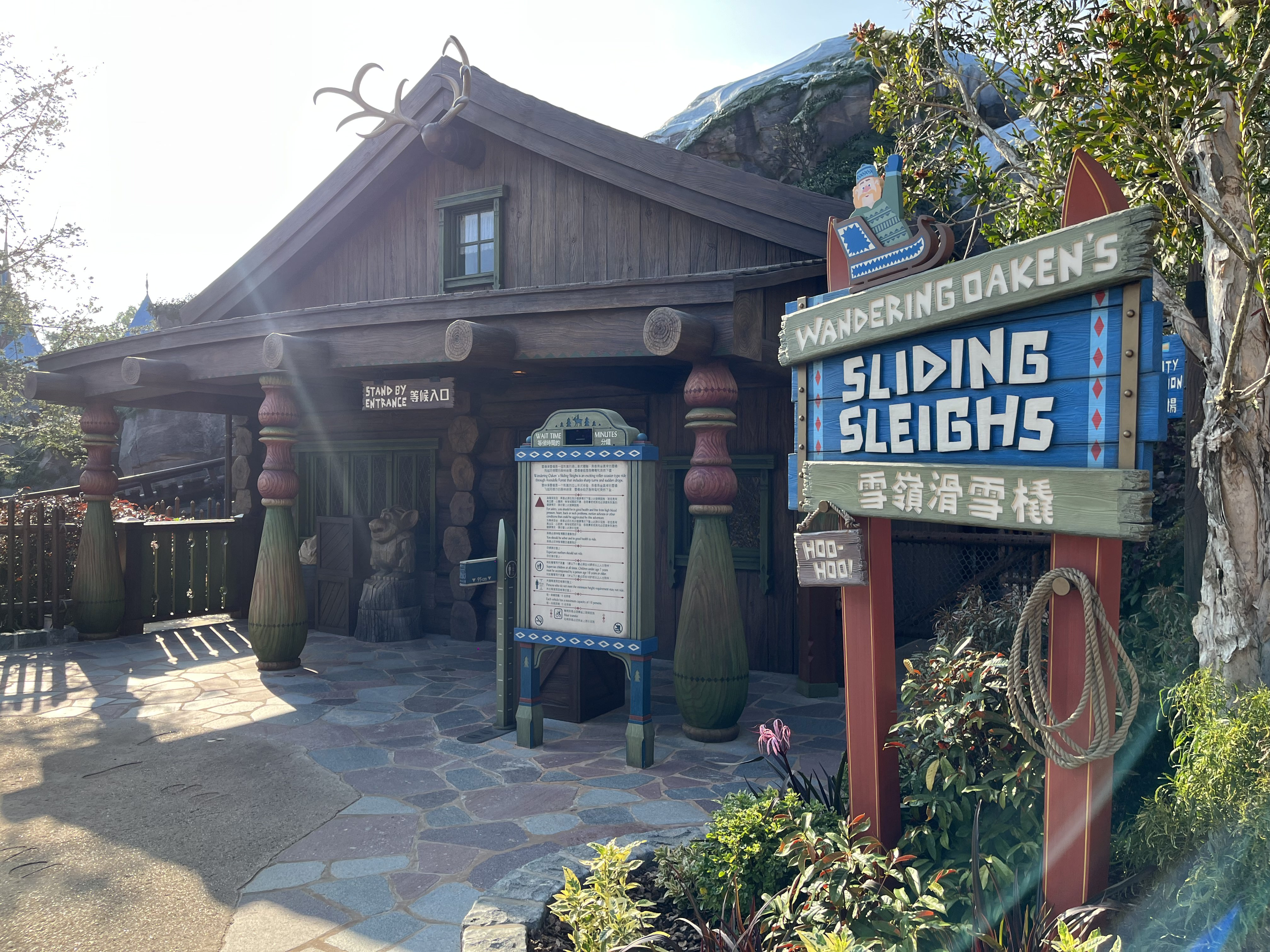

Hong Kong Disneyland
- Location: Hong Kong Disneyland
- Park section: World of Frozen
- Coordinates: 22.313°N 114.0388°E
- Status: Operating
- Opening date: November 20, 2023
- Wandering Oaken's Sliding Sleighs at Hong Kong Disneyland at RCDB

General statistics
- Manufacturer: Vekoma
- Model: Junior Coaster
- Length: 298 m (978 ft)
- Trains: 2 trains with 8 cars. Riders are arranged 2 across in a single row for a total of 16 riders per train.
- Theme: Frozen
- Must transfer from wheelchair

Wandering Oaken's Sliding Sleighs (traditional Chinese: 雪嶺滑雪橇) is an attraction in World of Frozen at Hong Kong Disneyland in Penny's Bay on Lantau Island. The attraction is themed around the Wandering Oaken's Trading Post and Sauna from Disney Animation's 2013 film Frozen and opened on November 20, 2023.

The attraction was announced at the D23 Expo in August 2019 and designed by Dutch Disney-imagineer Michel den Dulk. The first track sections arrived at the park in June 2020.

== Attraction ==
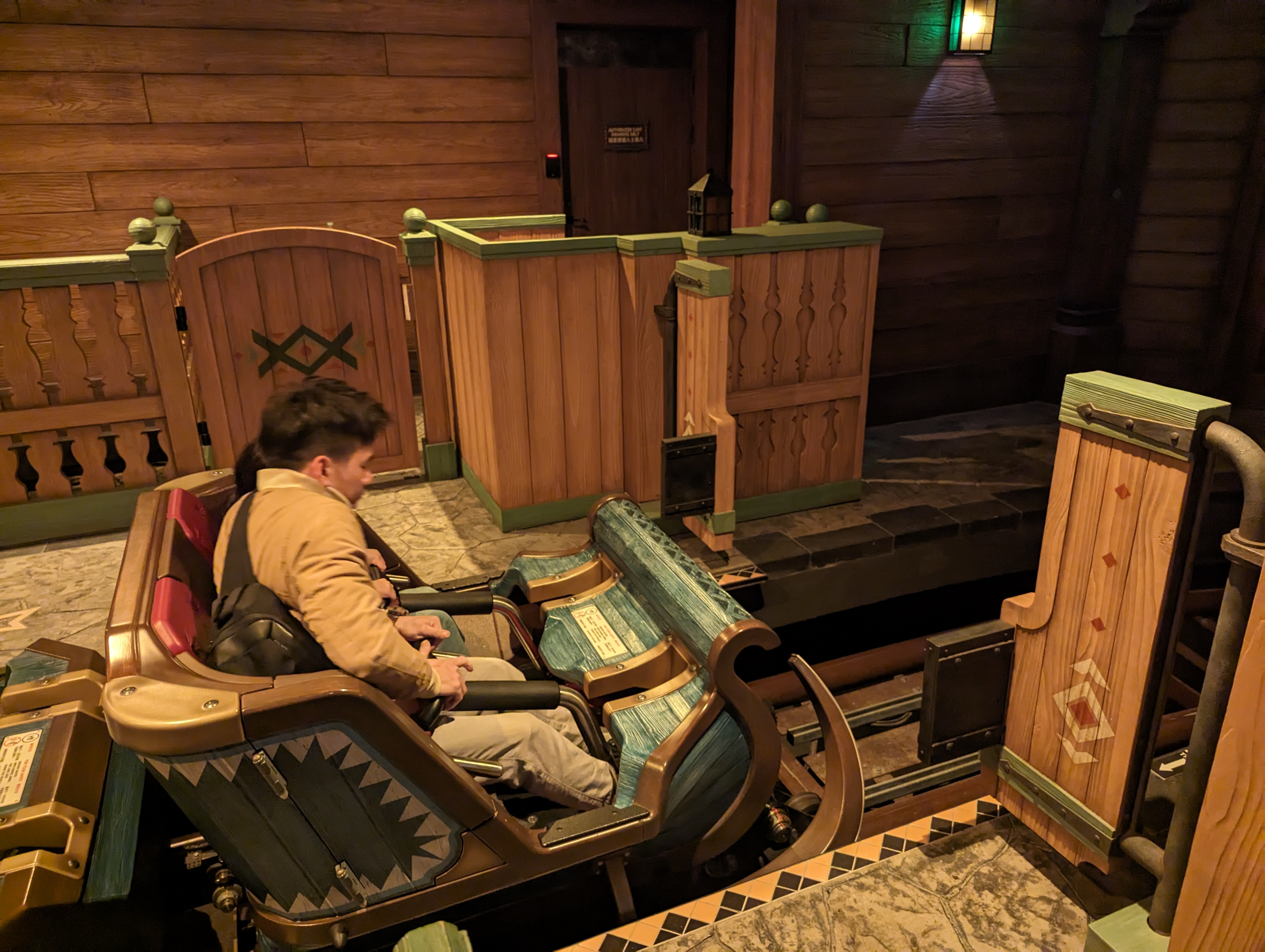
The train in the station.

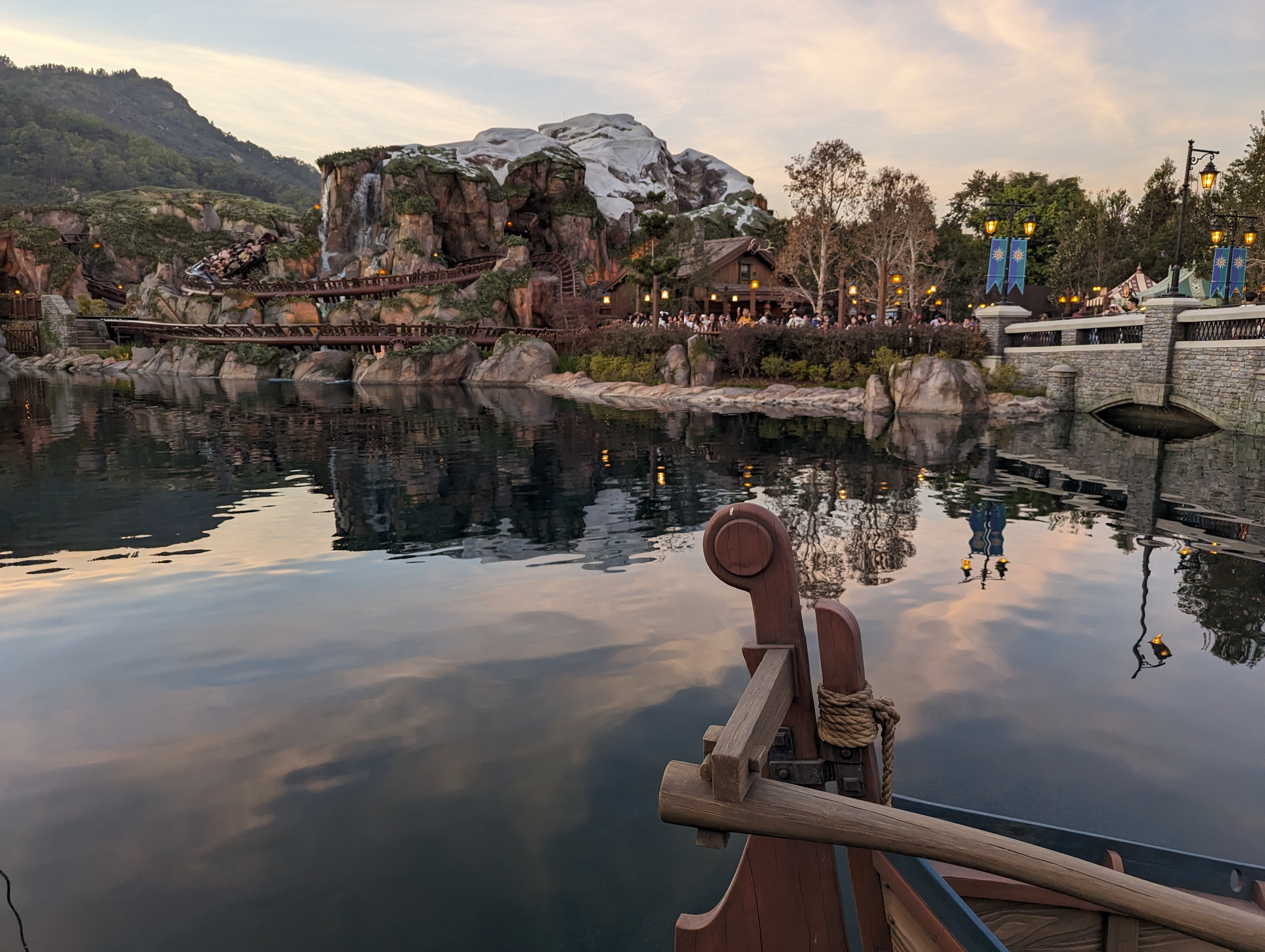
The view of the attraction.

Wandering Oaken's Sliding Sleighs takes passengers on a journey through Arendelle, the Frozen kingdom. The ride starts in Oaken's shop, after which Olaf and Sven pull the roller coaster train, consisting of 8 cars and designed as a sled, to the top of the lift hill. Both characters can also be seen as simple animatronics just after the station.

The attraction is a Custom Junior Coaster built by the Dutch manufacturer Vekoma. The track is 298 meters long and almost completely built into an artificial mountain.

== History ==
The opening was originally scheduled to take place in 2021. However, the opening was postponed until 2023 due to the coronavirus pandemic. The attraction was originally announced in 2016 as a trackless ride called Wandering Oaken's Dancing Sleighs (traditional Chinese: 奧肯魔法雪橇), similar to Aquatopia at Tokyo DisneySea.
