= Hong Kong Disneyland =

Theme park on Lantau Island, Hong Kong

Hong Kong Disneyland 香港迪士尼樂園

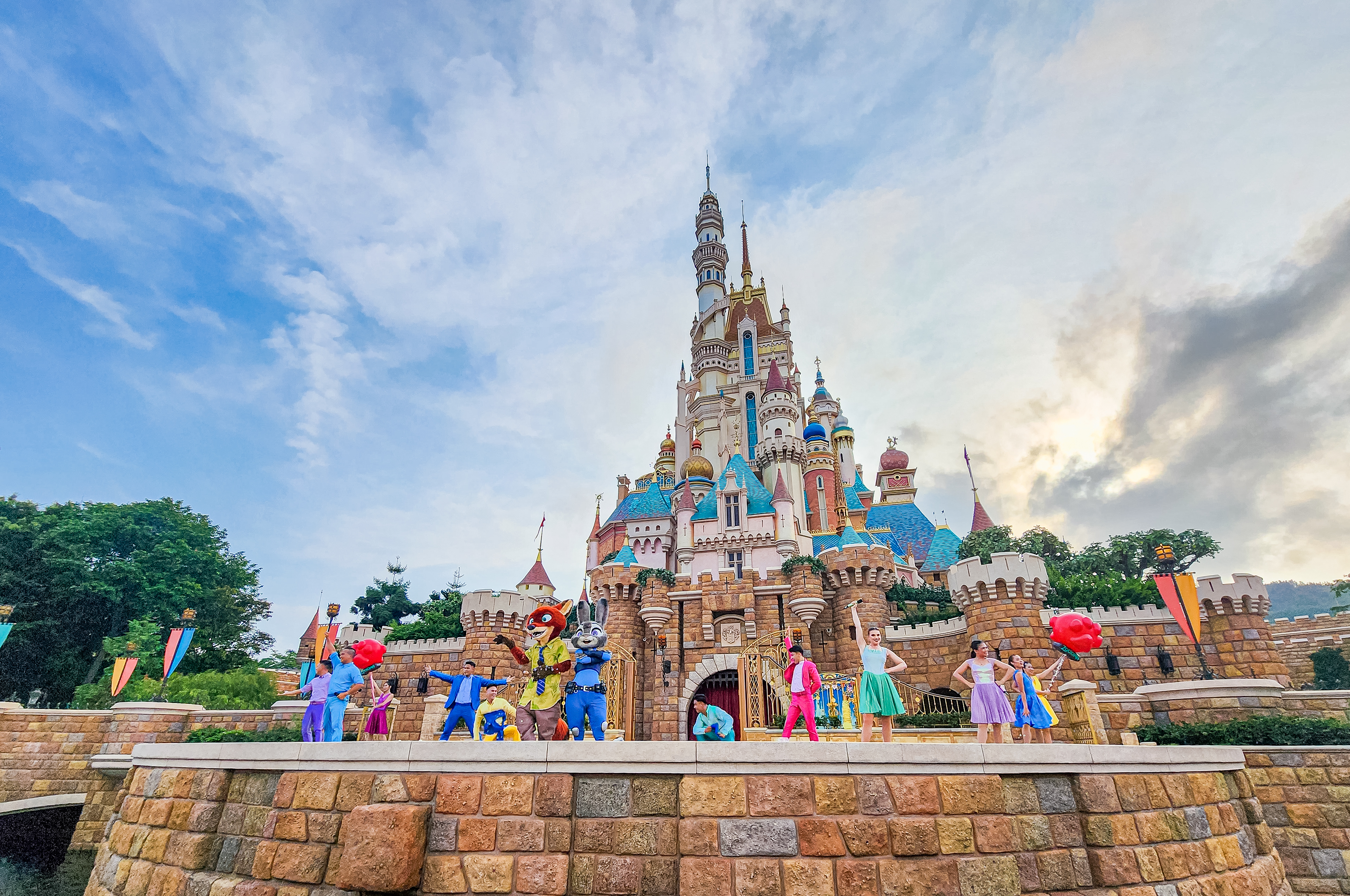
- Castle of Magical Dreams, icon of Hong Kong Disneyland, in 2023
- Interactive map of Hong Kong Disneyland 香港迪士尼樂園
- Location: Hong Kong Disneyland Resort, Sunny Bay, Lantau Island, Hong Kong
- Coordinates: 22°18′48″N 114°02′36″E
- Status: Operating
- Opened: 12 September 2005; 21 years ago
- Owner: Disney Experiences (The Walt Disney Company)
- Operated by: Hong Kong International Theme Parks
- Theme: Fairy tales, adventure, America, future and Disney characters
- Slogan: The happiest place on earth Believe in Magic
- Website: Hong Kong Disneyland Homepage

Hong Kong Disneyland
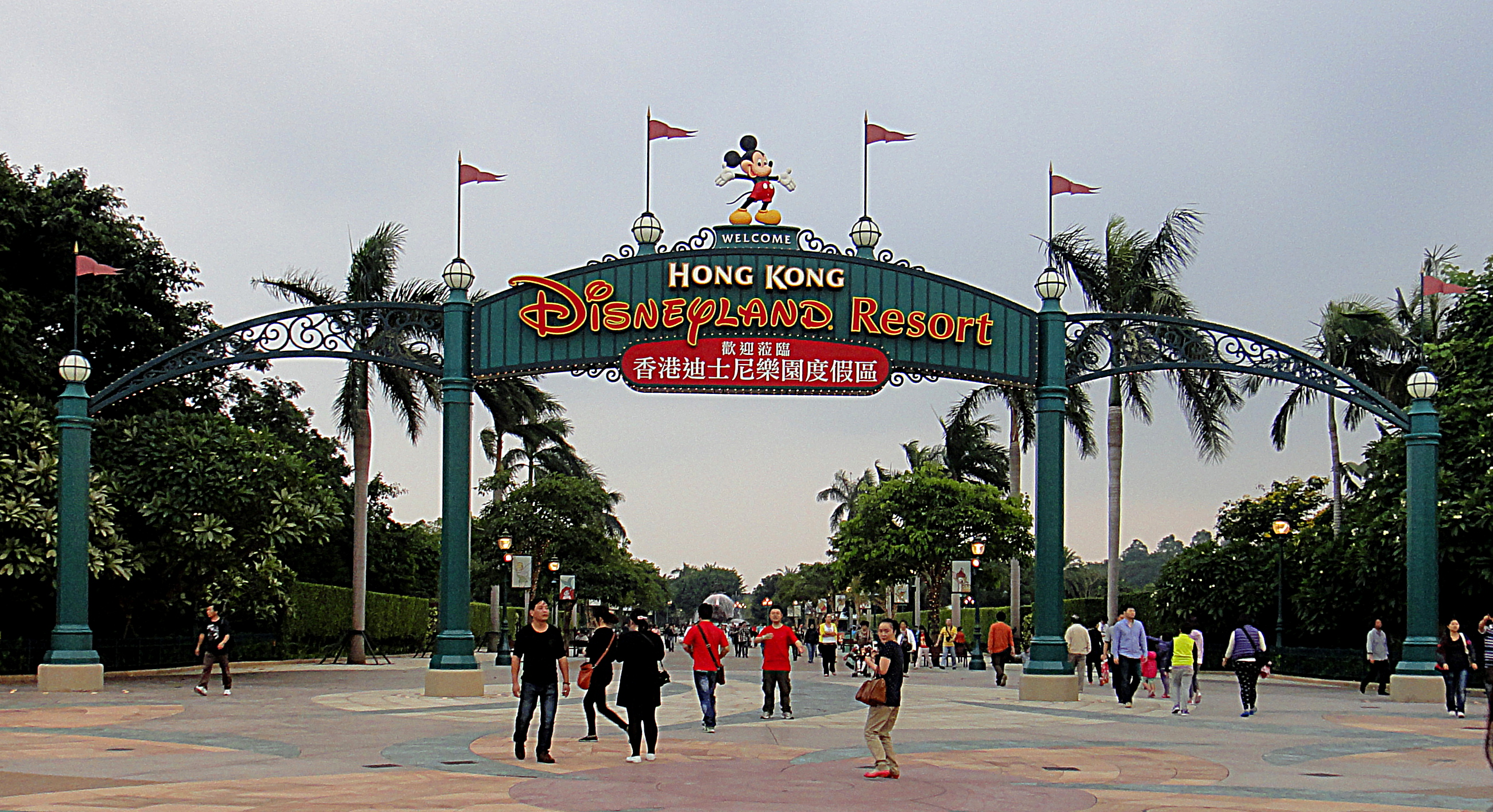
- Front entrance of Disneyland
- Traditional Chinese: 香港迪士尼樂園
- Simplified Chinese: 香港迪士尼乐园
Transcriptions
Standard Mandarin
- Hanyu Pinyin: Xiānggǎng Díshìní Lèyuán
- Bopomofo: ㄒㄧㄤ ㄍㄤˇ ㄉㄧˊ ㄕˋ ㄋㄧˊ ㄌㄜˋ ㄩㄢˊ
- Wade–Giles: Hsiang^{1}-kang^{3} Ti^{2}-shih^{4}-ni^{2} Le^{4}-yüan^{2}
- Tongyong Pinyin: Sianggǎng Dí-shìh-ní Lè-yuán
- IPA: [ɕjáŋ.kàŋ tǐ.ʂɻ̩̂.nǐ lɤ̂.ɥɛ̌n]
Hakka
- Romanization: Hiong^{1}gong^{2} Tik^{6}si^{3}ni^{4} Lok^{6}yuen^{4}
Yue: Cantonese
- Yale Romanization: Hēung Góng Dihksihnèih Lohkyùhn
- Jyutping: hoeng1 gong2 dik6 si6 nei4 lok6 jyun4
- IPA: [hœŋ˥ kɔŋ˧˥ tɪk̚˨ si˨ nej˩ lɔk̚˨ jyn˩]

Hong Kong Disneyland (Chinese: 香港迪士尼樂園) (abbreviated HKDL; also known as HK Disneyland or Disneyland Hong Kong) is a theme park located on reclaimed land in Penny's Bay, Lantau Island, Hong Kong. It opened to visitors on Monday, September 12, 2005, at 13:00 HKT, the second Disneyland in Asia to open after Tokyo Disneyland in 1983, with Shanghai Disneyland later opening in 2016. Hong Kong Disneyland is located inside the Hong Kong Disneyland Resort and is owned by Hong Kong International Theme Parks, which is a joint venture between Government of Hong Kong and The Walt Disney Company in which they respectively own 52% and 48% currently. It is the most visited theme park in Hong Kong, followed by Ocean Park Hong Kong. Disney attempted to avoid problems of cultural backlash by incorporating Chinese culture, customs, and traditions when designing and building the resort, including adherence to the rules of feng shui. Notably, a bend was put in a walkway near the Hong Kong Disneyland Resort entrance so good qi energy would not flow into the South China Sea.

The park consists of eight themed lands: Main Street, U.S.A., Fantasyland, Adventureland, Tomorrowland, Grizzly Gulch, Mystic Point, Toy Story Land, and World of Frozen. The park has a daily capacity of 34,000 visitors — the lowest of all Disneyland parks.

== History ==
=== Early history ===
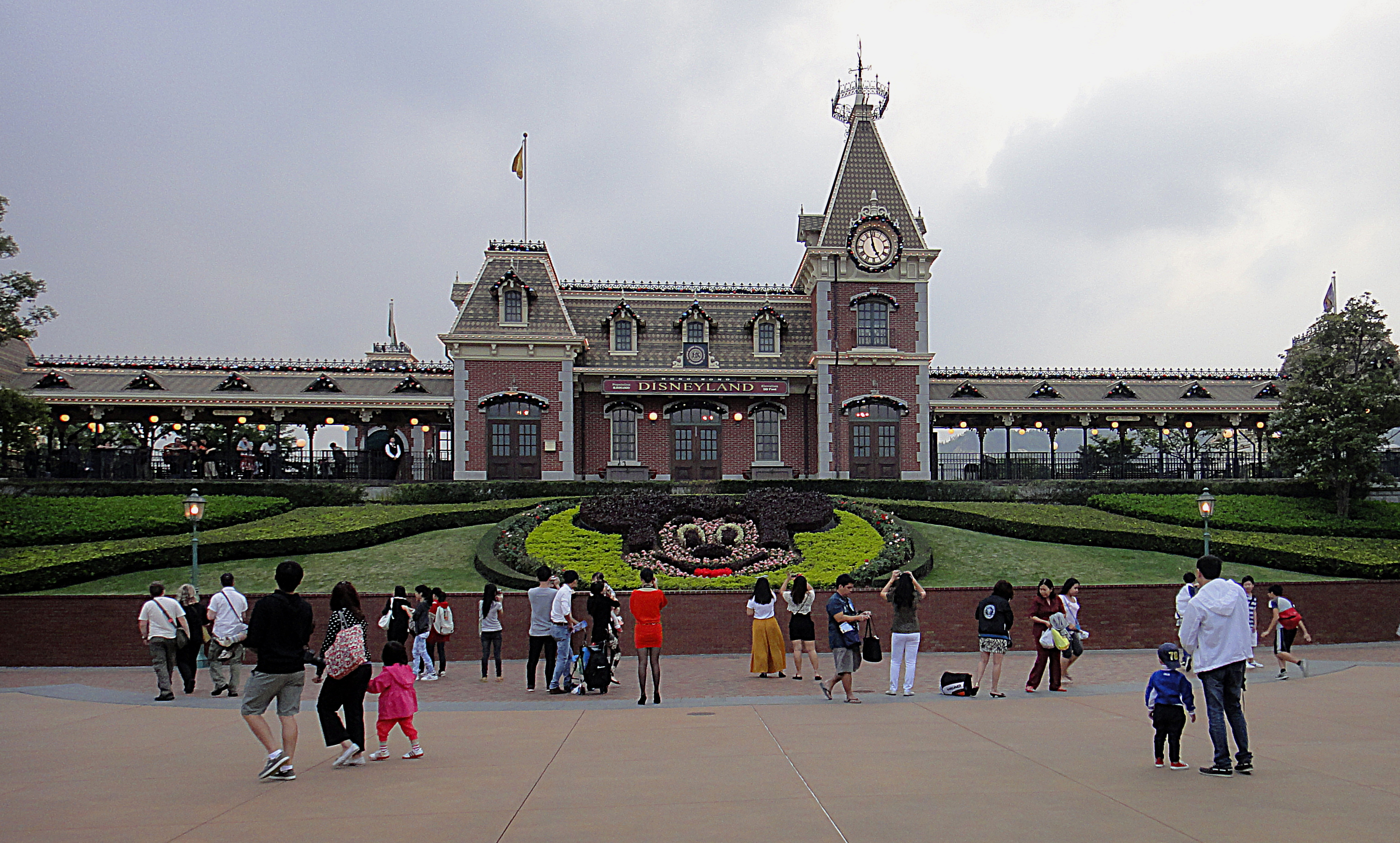
Front view of Hong Kong Disneyland

Penny's Bay was filled in to provide land for the construction of Hong Kong Disneyland. The bay was previously undeveloped except for the Cheoy Lee Shipyard, which opened in the 1960s.

The city's chief executive, Tung Chee-hwa, was instrumental in introducing the Disneyland project to Hong Kong. When the SARS epidemic devastated the city's economy in 2003, it was hoped that the new Disneyland would help boost confidence in Hong Kong's tourism industry.

Hong Kong Disneyland had one of the shortest construction periods of any Disneyland-style theme park. On 12 January 2003, more than 400 guests celebrated the groundbreaking of Hong Kong Disneyland after the finishing of land reclamation in Penny's Bay. The audience included Tung Chee-hwa; Michael D. Eisner, former chairman and CEO of The Walt Disney Company; Bob Iger, president of The Walt Disney Company; and Jay Rasulo, former president of Walt Disney Parks and Resorts. On 23 September 2004, a special "castle topping ceremony" was held in the park to commemorate the placing of the tallest turret on Sleeping Beauty Castle.

Sleeping Beauty Castle, the original centerpiece of the park until 2018, being replaced by the Castle of Magical Dreams.

On 12 September 2005, Hong Kong Disneyland was officially opened to the public. The opening ceremony was officiated by Zeng Qinghong, who was then the vice president of China. To help Hong Kong Disneyland grow, the Chinese government had deliberately slowed down the development of Shanghai Disney Resort, which was first conceived in the early 2000s.

=== Expansion ===
Former empty land reserved for future expansion viewed from Tarzan's Treehouse in Adventureland. It is now where Grizzly Gulch is located.

In January 2012, Hong Kong Disneyland has been in the process of negotiating with the Government of Hong Kong to invest its HK$5 billion profit for new attractions. Further details of the expansion would be announced within a 12-month period from January 2012. A shopping complex and new hotels would be taken into consideration for the new expansion plan.

In Hong Kong financial secretary John Tsang's 2013–14 budget speech, he announced that a new night time parade: "Disney Paint The Night Parade", as well as an area featuring characters from the Marvel Universe, would be built in Hong Kong Disneyland. On 8 October 2013 then Walt Disney Parks and Resorts chairman Thomas O. Staggs confirmed the development of the Iron Man Experience.

On 17 February 2014, Hong Kong Disneyland announced its 2012–13 financial results as well as a plan for the third hotel at the resort. The hotel would be the resort's largest, featuring 750 rooms with an adventure and exotic theme, and would cost HK$4.26 billion to build. The third hotel, Disney Explorers Lodge, opened on 30 April 2017.

Hong Kong Disneyland was also built with space for a second park directly across the entrance to the current park. Disney has not yet announced plans for a second park. The land is also available for additional hotels other than the three currently standing, but the common thought is that a second park would be built before a fourth hotel. However, it was announced in September 2020 by the Hong Kong Government that the park's option to purchase the 60-hectare expansion site next to the existing park would not be extended after its expiry on 24 September as it is unable to commit to using the site in the near future.

On 22 November 2016, the Walt Disney Company and the Hong Kong Government announced plans for a multi-year, HK$10.9 billion expansion of Hong Kong Disneyland. The proposed expansion includes a Frozen-themed land (announced for 2021), a Marvel-themed land (opening in phases from 2018 to 2023), a redesigned castle to succeed Sleeping Beauty Castle and hub (announced for 2020), a reimagined attraction (announced for 2021), a new Moana stage show (announced for 2018), and live entertainment.

On 24 May 2018, Hong Kong Disneyland opened the first project part of the multi-year expansion: Moana: a Homecoming Celebration, an atmosphere stage show performed daily at the newly built Jungle Junction venue in Adventureland. The park also gave more information on the coming projects as well as the revised dates for these projects: the shooting dark ride Ant-Man and The Wasp: Nano Battle!, replacing Buzz Lightyear Astro Blasters, opened in 2019 and the new expanded castle will be unveiled in 2020, in time for the park's 15th anniversary. Park officials also confirmed the rumors that the future Frozen-themed land would feature a copy of Epcot's Frozen Ever After and a family roller coaster named Wandering Oaken’s Sliding Sleighs, replacing the previously announced Dancing Sleighs ride.

On 26 January 2020, the park closed due to the COVID-19 pandemic along with Ocean Park Hong Kong and Shanghai Disneyland Park. It remained closed for nearly five months, reopening on 18 June 2020. It was the second Disney park to reopen after Shanghai Disneyland. It reopened with similar strict rules as Shanghai Disneyland, which included limited capacity, social distancing, temperature checks, and mandatory wearing of face masks. Hong Kong Disneyland closed again from 15 July to 25 September 2020 due to a heavy upsurge in domestic cases. After reopening for approximately two months, it was announced the park would close for a third time on 2 December 2020 due to a rising number of COVID-19 cases in the region. The park reopened on 19 February 2021. The park closed for the fourth time on 7 January 2022 due to the rising number of cases of the Omicron variant, and reopened on 21 April 2022.

In 2023, Hong Kong Disneyland expanded again and opened its eighth land, "World of Frozen", on 20 November.

=== Timeline ===
Pre 2000–2009
- 1998
  - August – The Walt Disney Company and the government of Hong Kong announce their intention to construct a themed entertainment park in Hong Kong, the second in Asia, the first in China
- 1999
  - February – Penny's Bay, Lantau Island is announced as the future site of the Hong Kong Disneyland Resort
  - 10 December – Disney and the Hong Kong Government sign an agreement for building the second Disney Resort in Asia
- 2003
  - 1 January – Construction on Hong Kong Disneyland Resort begins
- 2004
  - 22 November – Disney announces that the opening day of the park has been rescheduled from 2006 to 12 September 2005
- 2005
  - 12 September – Hong Kong Disneyland officially opens to the public.
- 2006
  - June – HKDL announces to release Summer Passes to boost its first year attendance.
  - 13 July – Autopia, Stitch Encounter and UFO Zone open in HKDL as the first part of its expansion.
  - August – Exclusive treats are provided for Summer Pass holders so as to further boost the park's attendance
  - 4 September – More than 60,000 Summer Passes have been sold since 1 July. However, Hong Kong Disneyland has missed its target of 5.6 million in the first year of operation, with only about 5 million guests visiting the park since its opening
  - 28 September – HKDL launches its annual pass.
  - 30 September – Disney's Halloween celebration held for the first time through 31 October 2006
  - 14 December – HKDL announced three new attractions to be added to the park in 2007–2008
- 2007
  - 26 June – HKDL revealed its attractions for the park's 2007 summer – "Mickey's Summer Blast" and announcement of Mickey's Water Works Parade and Animation Academy's opening date – 14 July 2007
  - 19 December – HKDL revealed 4 new attractions and entertainment venues to open in 2008 with "It's a Small World": Muppet Mobile Lab, High School Musical Celebration, Turtle Talk with Crush and the Art of Animation
- 2008
  - 28 April – "It's a Small World" opens in HKDL as the first extension of Fantasyland
- 2009
  - 10 July – The Legislative Council of Hong Kong approved the three land expansion of HKDL
  - 13 December – Groundbreaking ceremony for the construction of the three land expansion
2010–2019
- 2010
  - 12 September – HKDL celebrates its 5th anniversary.
- 2011
  - 21 January – HKDL hosts the year-long 5th anniversary programme "Celebration in the Air"
  - 18 November – Toy Story Land opens.
- 2012
  - 14 July – Grizzly Gulch opens.
- 2013
  - 17 May – Mystic Point opens.
  - 7 October – Iron Man Experience is announced.
  - 6 November – Disney Paint the Night parade is announced.
- 2014
  - February – Construction of Iron Man Experience begins.
  - 1 October – Disney Paint the Night is shown for the first time.
- 2015
  - 12 September – HKDL celebrates its 10th anniversary.
  - 17 November – HKDL hosts the year-long 10th anniversary programme "Happily Ever After"
  - 17 December – Fairytale Forest, a new attraction in Fantasyland, opens
  - 21 December – Mickey and the Wondrous Storybook replaces The Golden Mickeys as the new flagship live stage show of Fantasyland.
- 2016
  - 11 June – Star Wars: Tomorrowland Takeover, a Star Wars-themed seasonal event, launches.
  - 22 November – HKDL announced its new expansion and development plan, which includes the construction of World of Frozen, introduction of Marvel-themed rides, and redesigning of the Sleeping Beauty Castle.
- 2017
  - 11 January – Iron Man Experience opens.
  - 30 April – Disney Explorers Lodge opens.
  - 31 August – Buzz Lightyear Astro Blasters closed to be replaced by Ant-Man and The Wasp: Nano Battle!
  - 13 October – Construction begins on Moana, Frozen, and Marvel attractions.
  - 14 December – Royal Princess Garden a temporary attraction, opens at Main Street, U.S.A.
- 2018
  - 1 January – Disney in the Stars is presented for the last time, due to the closure of Sleeping Beauty Castle for reconstruction.
  - 15 March – We Love Mickey! debuts at Main Street, U.S.A.
  - 25 May – Moana: A Homecoming Celebration opens at Jungle Junction in Adventureland.
  - 7 November – We Love Mickey! Birthday Edition debuts at Main Street, U.S.A. as part of Mickey Mouse's 90th Anniversary.
- 2019
  - 16 February – The "Heart" Gazebo at Fantasyland closed to make way for World of Frozen.
  - 31 March – Ant-Man and The Wasp: Nano Battle! opens.
  - 21 June
    - Royal Princess Garden closed.
    - Bibbidi Bobbidi Boutique at Main Street, U.S.A. closed for relocation to Fantasyland, where it reopened on 1 July.
2020–present
- 2020
  - 26 January – The park closed due to the COVID-19 pandemic.
  - 18 June – The park reopened to the public with new and enhanced health and safety measures.
  - 15 July – The park closed for the second time due to a rising number of COVID-19 cases.
  - 12 September – While closed, the park celebrated its 15th anniversary.
  - 24 September – Hong Kong Disneyland's option to purchase the adjacent land for expansion expired and was not renewed
  - 25 September – The park reopened for the second time, implementing reduced operations, including closures on Tuesdays and Thursdays (except public holidays and special days designated by the resort from time to time).
  - 21 November – The park's centerpiece castle, now called Castle of Magical Dreams, was officially unveiled.
  - 2 December – The park closed for the third time due to a rising number of COVID-19 cases.
- 2021
  - 19 February – The park reopens for the third time.
  - 17 November – The park closed for one day following a single COVID-19 exposure from a park guest.
- 2022
  - 7 January – The park closes for the fourth time due to fears of a COVID-19 surge of the Omicron variant.
  - 21 April – The park reopens for the fourth time.
  - 18 June – Momentous debuts.
- 2023
  - 1 September – The park increased operations to be open 6 days a week, with closures occurring on Wednesdays instead of Tuesdays and Thursdays (except public holidays and special days designated by the resort from time to time).
  - 20 November – World of Frozen is opened to the public, in honor of the film's 10th-anniversary celebration and as part of the Disney 100 Years of Wonder celebration.
- 2024
  - 25 April – A new daytime show, Find Your Super Power: Battle for Stark Expo, and a new nighttime show, Find Your Super Power: Battle in the Sky, both debuted in Stark Expo within Tomorrowland, as part of the "Marvel: Season of the Super Heroes" celebration.
  - 10 August – At D23 2024 on 10 August 2024, a new unnamed Spider-Man Attraction was announced to be built as part of Stark Expo.
  - 1 December – Mickey's PhilharMagic at Hong Kong Disneyland was closed for maintenance from 1 December 2024 to 23 April 2025, to undergo a digital upgrade and also to introduce the new "Coco" scene.
- 2025
  - 25 February – Hong Kong Disneyland Resort unveiled plans for another significant expansion featuring a Pixar entertainment experience and additional Marvel attractions.
  - 25 April – A new nighttime show, Join the Mission: Scarlet Skies debuted in Stark Expo within Tomorrowland, as part of the "Marvel: Season of the Super Heroes" celebration.
  - 28 June – HKDL hosted the year-long 20th anniversary programme "The Most Magical Party of All", with new daytime parade, castle stage show and other festivities.
  - 12 September – HKDL celebrated its 20th anniversary.
Future
- Future
  - Stark Expo
  - Pixar Entertainment Experience

== Park layout and attractions ==
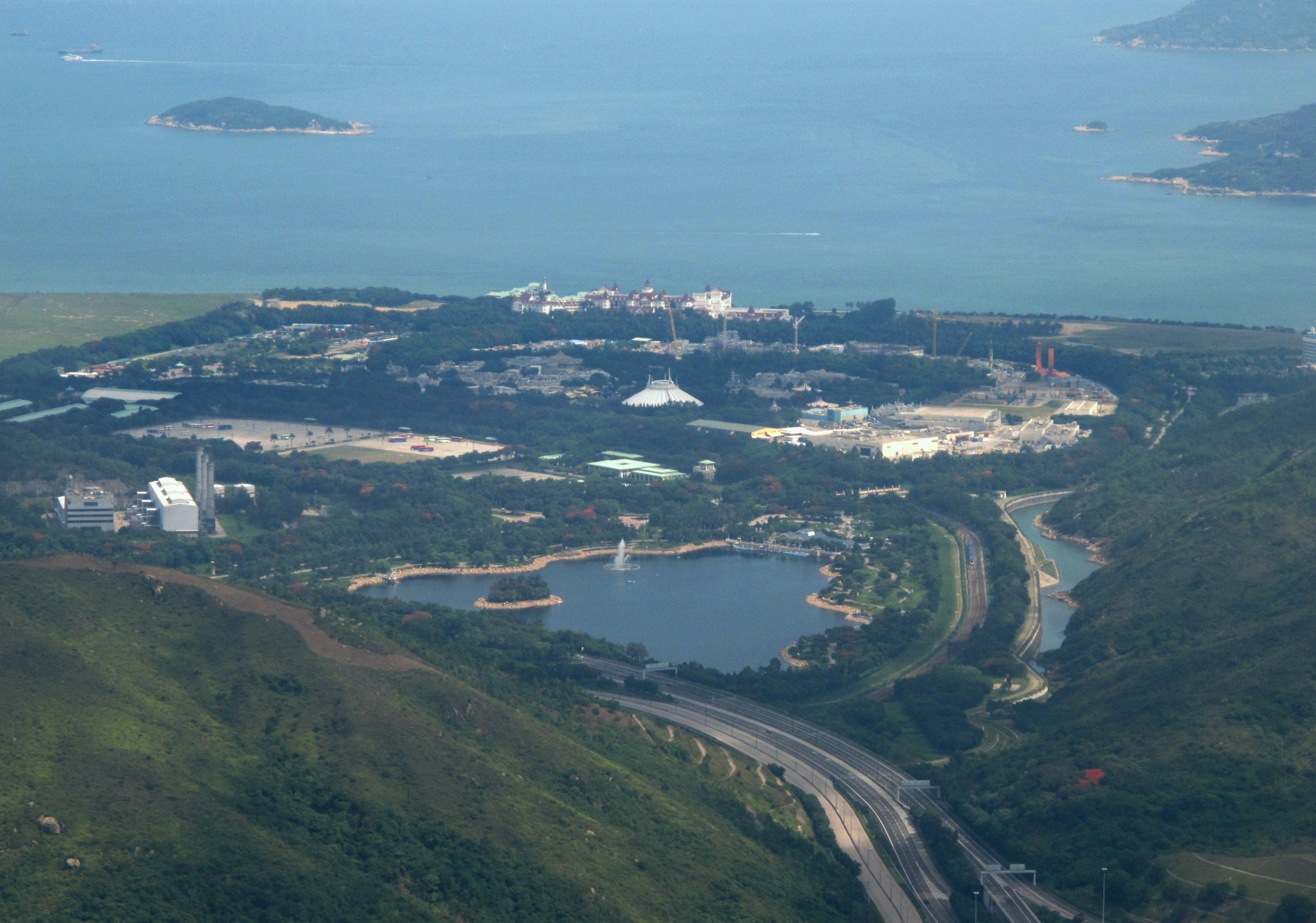
Aerial view of the park in 2011. The three new lands are under construction.

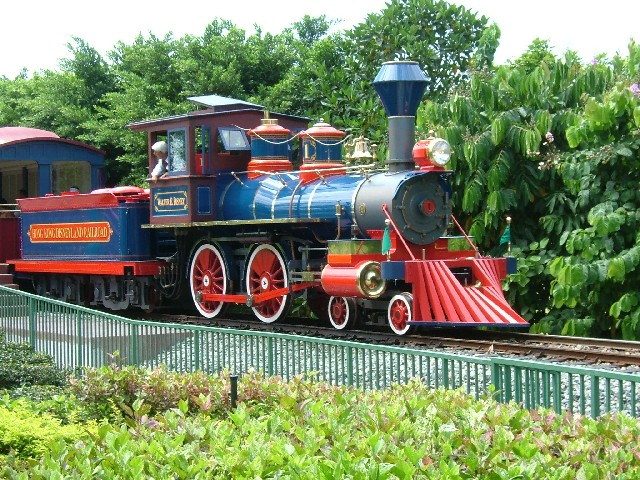
The Hong Kong Disneyland Railroad.

Hong Kong Disneyland is located on Lantau Island. The park is divided into eight themed lands. On entering a land, a guest is completely immersed in a themed environment and is unable to see or hear any other realm. The public areas occupy approximately 27.4 hectares (68 acres).

As of 2025, Hong Kong Disneyland has eight themed lands, each with different attractions, live entertainment, meet and greet, dining and boutiques. One future land, Stark Expo, has been announced.

=== Main Street, USA ===
Inspired by the Main Street, USA in Disneyland, the buildings of this Main Street are almost identical to those in Anaheim. Like other Disney theme parks, Hong Kong Disneyland's Main Street, USA serves as the entrance of the park. The decor is inspired by small-town America from the years 1890–1910.

Though being very similar to Anaheim's main street, the theme is heavily influenced by European immigrants. Plaza Inn — which has the identical exterior design as the one in Disneyland — mimics a classical Chinese eatery that was created by a wealthy American couple who were infatuated with Chinese culture. Another restaurant, the Market House Bakery is reminiscent of a bakery founded by a Viennese pastry chef who brought the world's most famous desserts from the Austrian imperial court.

Unlike Main Streets from other parks, Main Street at Hong Kong Disneyland is built mainly of wood instead of stone and there are no horse-drawn streetcars.

At the end of Main Street is the Castle of Magical Dreams. Opened in 2020, it is double the height of the park's original Sleeping Beauty Castle. The nodes of the castle are integrated with symbols relating to 13 princesses. The castle forecourt features a show stage and viewing area for the daytime stage show and nighttime spectacular, "Follow Your Dreams" and "Momentous", respectively.

The new walk-through attraction "Duffy and Friends Play House" opened in 2023.

The nighttime spectacular “Momentous: Party in the Night Sky!”, the stage show “Disney Friends Live: Party at the Castle!”, and the largest day parade in Hong Kong Disneyland’s history, “Friendtastic!”, began showing on 28 June 2025.

=== Fantasyland ===
Fantasyland features the Castle of Magical Dreams (which replaced the Sleeping Beauty Castle) as its icon. The attractions in this area include Mickey's PhilharMagic, The Many Adventures of Winnie the Pooh and It's a Small World. There is also Fantasy Gardens where park visitors could meet costumed Disney characters. The Fantasyland is also home to the "Mickey and the Wondrous Book" stage show.

=== Tomorrowland ===
Tomorrowland at Hong Kong Disneyland is themed to a SpacePort which features an emphasis on metallic trim, dominated by blue and purple hues. Since the opening of the park, unique attractions have been added into Hong Kong's Tomorrowland.

To celebrate the park's 10-year anniversary and coinciding with the release of Star Wars: The Force Awakens, Space Mountain was permanently rethemed to Star Wars: Hyperspace Mountain.

The first ever Marvel attraction in a Disney theme park, The Iron Man Experience, opened on 11 January 2017 in an area previously envisioned for a Star Tours-type attraction. The land also featured Buzz Lightyear Astro Blasters on opening day, which has since been rethemed to Ant-Man and The Wasp: Nano Battle! in 2019. Hong Kong Disneyland later announced that the attractions would become part of Stark Expo along with an unnamed Spider-man ride.

=== Adventureland ===
Hong Kong Disneyland's Adventureland is the biggest among all Disney parks. It features a large island area home to Tarzan's Treehouse, which is circled by the Jungle Cruise (under the name of Jungle River Cruise) — much like the Rivers of America in most Frontierland theme areas (and under the name of Rivers of Adventure). The Adventureland is also home to the "Festival of the Lion King" and "Moana: A Homecoming Celebration" stage shows.

=== Toy Story Land ===
Opened on 18 November 2011, Toy Story Land is the park's first expansion since its opening. It is located to the west side of the park, behind Fantasyland. Toy Story Land is themed using bamboo to act as giant blades of grass surrounding the area. The themed land makes use of characters from the Toy Story movies, such as an enlarged Woody, Rex, an oversized paper plane, and Luxo Jr.

Toy Story Land was marketed by the park as an "Asia exclusive". For some time, its only counterpart was Toy Story Playland at Walt Disney Studios Park in Marne-la-Vallée, France. After the land’s popularity in Hong Kong, it rolled out across the other Disney Parks in the world, with one in Shanghai Disneyland opening in April 2018 and one at Disney’s Hollywood Studios in Orlando opening in June that same year.

The main attractions include Slinky Dog Spin, Toy Soldier Parachute Drop, and RC Racer.

=== Grizzly Gulch ===
Opened on 14 July 2012, this land is the Hong Kong equivalent of Frontierland and Critter Country. The land is themed to an abandoned mining town called "Grizzly Gulch", set amidst mountains and woods. The centrepiece structure is Big Grizzly Mountain Runaway Mine Cars, inspired by Grizzly Peak in Disney California Adventure Park. The town was set to be founded 8 August 1888 — the luckiest day of the luckiest month of the luckiest year — by prospectors looking to discover gold.

=== Mystic Point ===
A themed land unique to Hong Kong Disneyland, it opened on 17 May 2013. It is set in 1909 at an adventurer's outpost established in 1896 in a dense, uncharted rain forest surrounded by mysterious forces and supernatural events. The site features Mystic Manor, home of Lord Henry Mystic, a world traveler and adventurer and his mischievous monkey, Albert.

=== World of Frozen ===
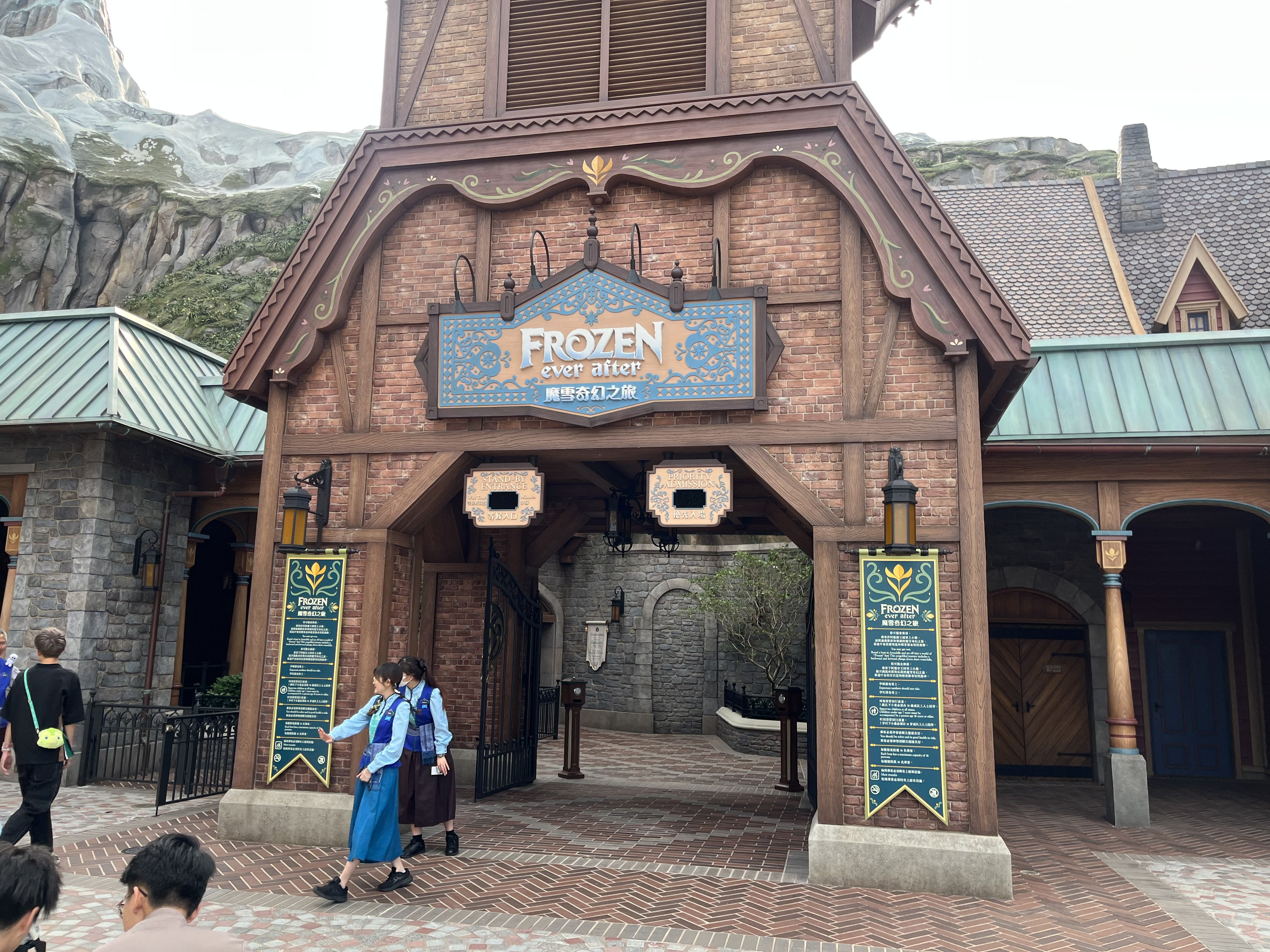
Entrance of Frozen Ever After, Hong Kong Disneyland 2023

A land behind Fantasyland hosts two rides themed to the movie Frozen. World of Frozen is set in the fictional Kingdom of Arendelle. The land features two rides, a dark ride similar to Frozen Ever After at EPCOT, and a sleigh-style family rollercoaster, called Wandering Oaken's Sliding Sleighs. "Playhouse in the Woods" is a live interactive show based on the film Frozen 2. It was originally set to open in 2020, but due to the COVID-19 pandemic, it was delayed to 2023, opening on 20 November.

=== Stark Expo ===
On 22 November 2016, it was announced that part of Tomorrowland would be transformed into a Marvel-themed area, as part of a massive six-year expansion plan. The first ever Marvel attraction in a Disney theme park, The Iron Man Experience, opened on 11 January 2017 in an area previously envisioned for a Star Tours-type attraction. The replacement of Buzz Lightyear Astro Blasters by an attraction featuring Ant-Man and The Wasp, named "Ant-Man and The Wasp: Nano Battle!" for 2019 and the construction, on the former Autopia site, of a major E ticket attraction, "Avengers Quinjet", based on the Avengers franchise, which was originally set to be completed by 2024. At D23 2024 on 10 August 2024, the Avengers Quinjet ride was cancelled to make way for a new unnamed Spider-Man attraction.

=== Pixar Entertainment Experience ===
On 25 February 2025, Hong Kong Disneyland Resort unveiled plans for a significant expansion of their theme park, introducing a new Pixar Entertainment Experience. An "all-new, exclusive Pixar Entertainment Experience" is set to be added to the park. Hong Kong Disneyland released a map pinpointing the location of this experience between Toy Story Land and the World of Frozen.

== Hong Kong Disneyland: The Grand Opening Celebration Album ==
Hong Kong Disneyland: The Grand Opening Celebration Album was the soundtrack for the grand opening ceremony of Hong Kong Disneyland at Hong Kong Disneyland Resort. Much of the album are Cantonese or Mandarin cover of theme songs of animated Disney films. The package contains a DVD featuring music videos. The album does not contain any music used in the park.

=== Track listing ===
- Released: 2 September 2005
- Label: Sony Music Entertainment (Hong Kong)
- Language: Cantonese and Mandarin
- Status: Out of print
1. Jacky Cheung – "Let the Wonder Soar" (讓奇妙飛翔) (Cantonese)
2. Twins – "It's a Small World"
3. Eason Chan – "A Whole New World" (from Aladdin)
4. Karen Mok – "When You Wish Upon a Star" (from Pinocchio)
5. Twins – "Mickey Mouse Theme"
6. Jolin Tsai – "Under the Sea" (from The Little Mermaid)
7. Kelly Chen & Kellyjackie – "On a Date With Him to Disneyland" (他約我去迪士尼)
8. Nicholas Tse – "Bare Necessities" (from The Jungle Book)
9. CoCo Lee – "Colors of the Wind" (from Pocahontas)
10. Joey Yung – "Undying True Love" (from Beauty and the Beast)
11. Kelly Chen – "Reflection" (from Mulan)
12. Harlem Yu – "Can You Feel the Love Tonight" (from The Lion King)
13. Jacky Cheung – "Let the Wonder Soar" (讓奇妙飛翔) (Mandarin)

DVD

- Subtitles: Traditional Chinese
- Region Code: Region 0 (Worldwide)
1. "Let the Wonder Soar" (讓奇妙飛翔) music video – Jacky Cheung
2. "On a Date With Him to Disneyland" (他約我去迪士尼) music video – Kelly Chen & Kellyjackie
3. Cars trailer
4. The Chronicles of Narnia: The Lion, The Witch and the Wardrobe trailer
5. Chicken Little trailer
6. Sky High trailer

New English Theme Song:

1. Love The Memory – Jordan Powers, Jason Maters & Tony Ferrari

== Public transport ==
=== MTR ===
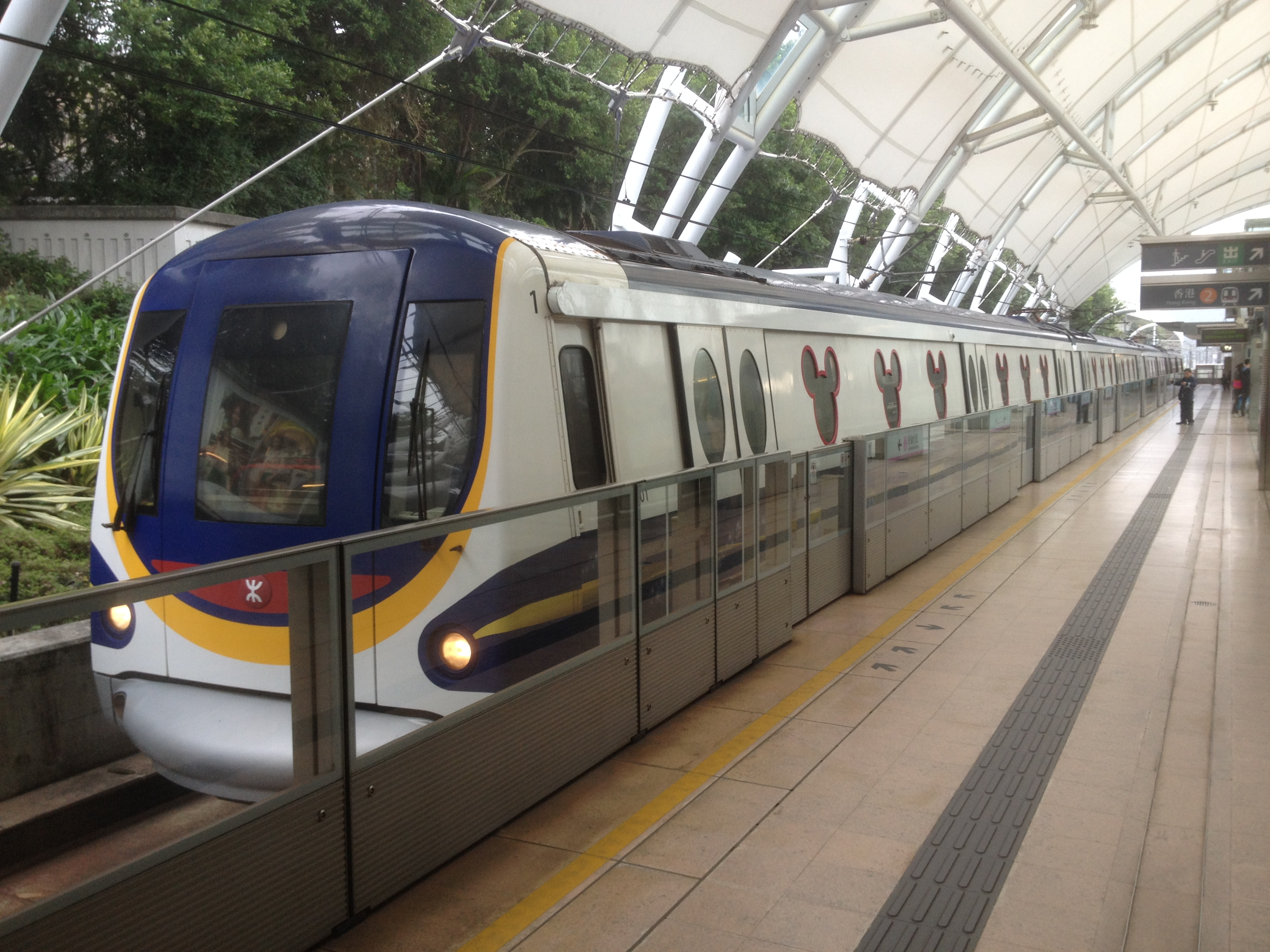
Disneyland Resort Line

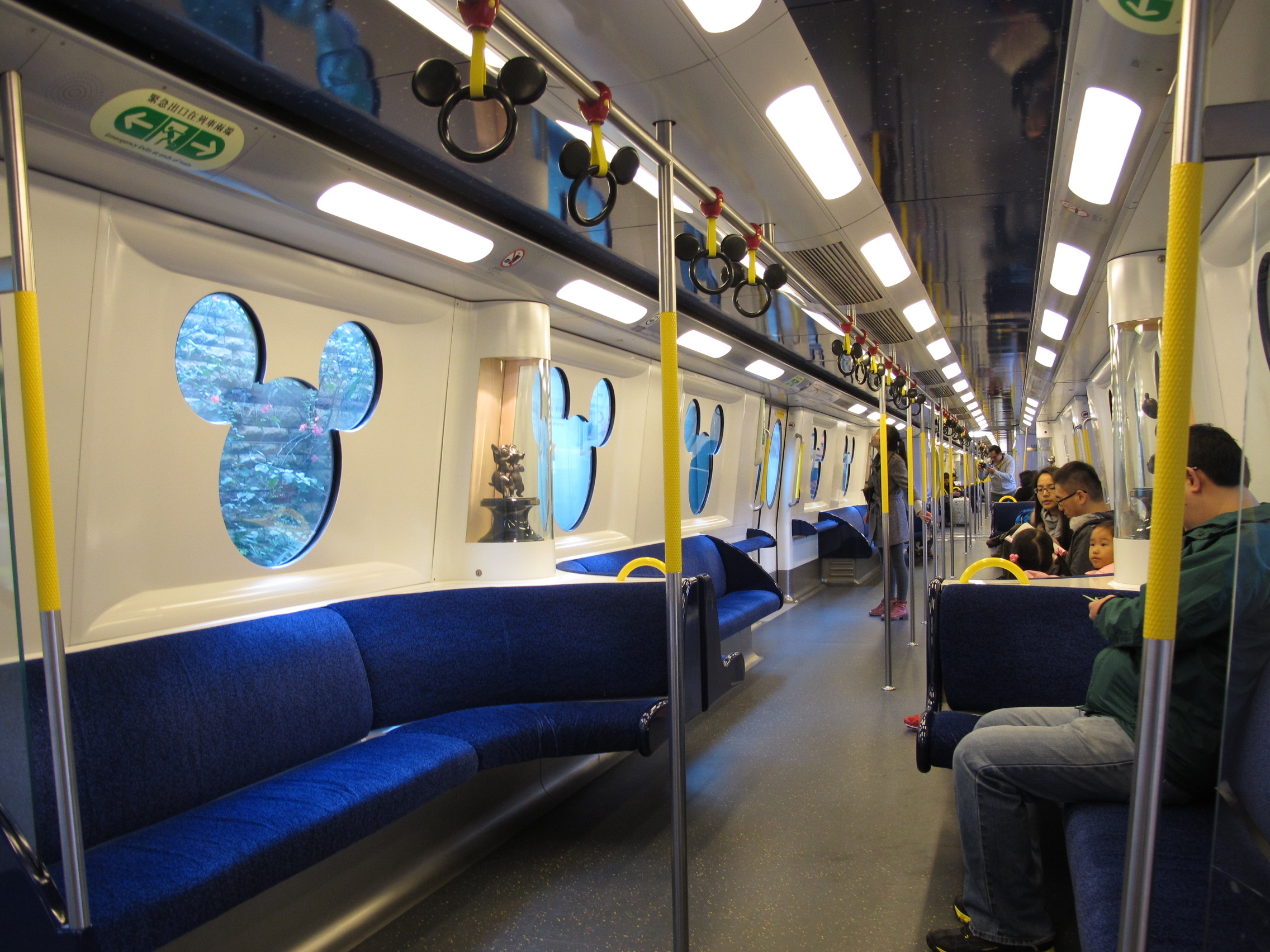
Disneyland Resort Line Train interior

The park is accessible on the MTR via the purpose-built Disneyland Resort line, a themed shuttle train service between the Disneyland Resort station adjacent to the park, and Sunny Bay station, where passengers can transfer to the Tung Chung line for access to Hong Kong Island, Kowloon, or Tung Chung. The line runs modified Metro Cammell M-Trains on the 3.5 kilometres (2.2 mi) non-stop route. The trains run fully automatically without drivers. The first train of the day from Sunny Bay station to Disneyland Resort departs at 06:15 and the last train at 00:45.

=== Bus ===
Long Win Bus operates 3 regular routes to the Disneyland Resort Public Transport Interchange in front of the park.

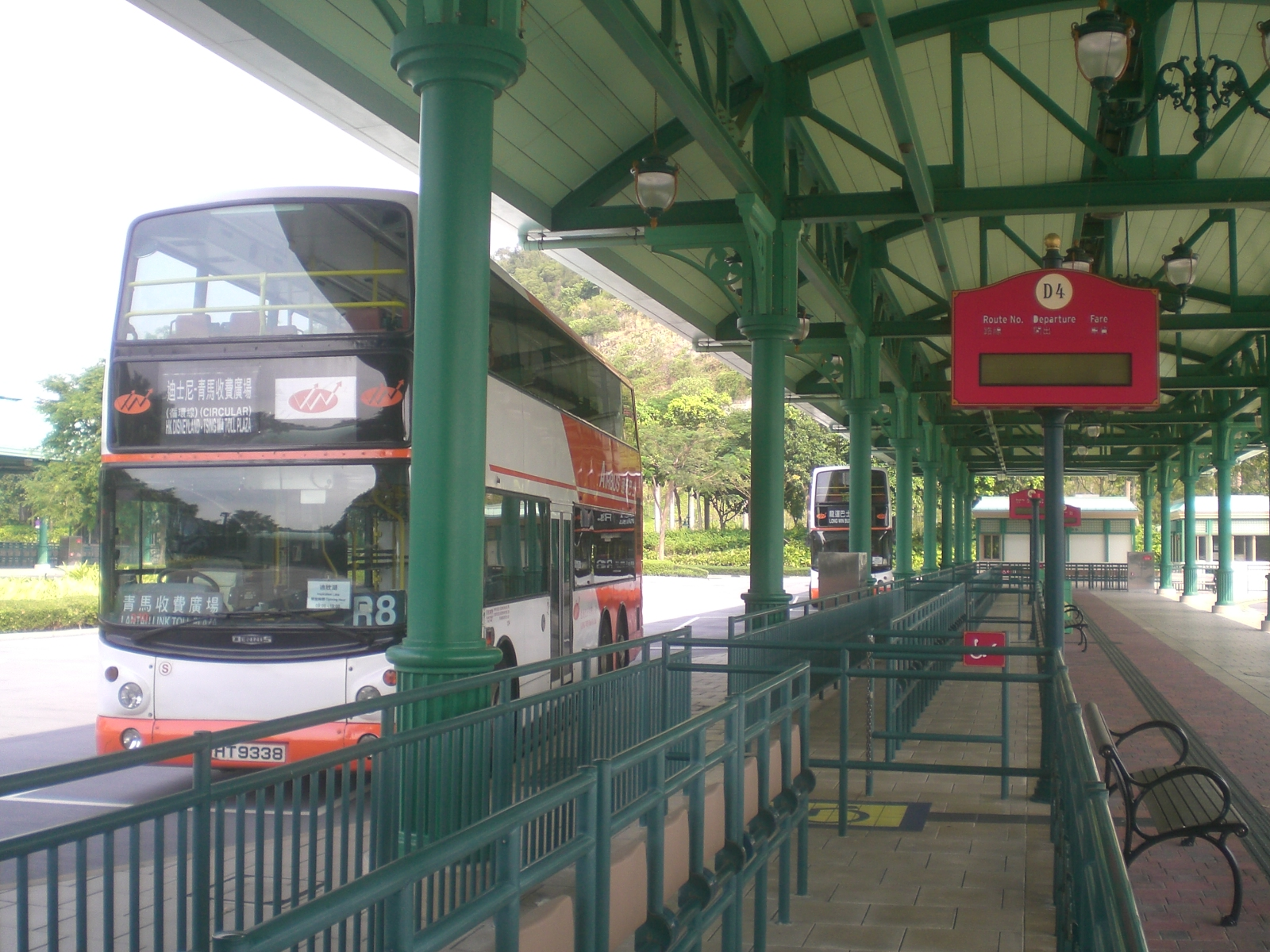
Long Win Bus Route R8 at the Disneyland Resort bus terminus

Route R8 is a circular route running between Disneyland and the Lantau Link Toll Plaza Bus Interchange. The latter can be accessed by any of the routes with the A or E prefixes (e.g. A11 or E32), and is always the first stop after crossing the Tsing Ma Bridge. It is the only all-day route serving the park, and is jointly operated with vehicles from Citybus.

Two additional regular routes, running on weekends and public holidays only, provide direct service between other places in the New Territories and Disneyland. They are route R33 to Tuen Mun station, connecting to the MTR, and route R42 to Tai Wai station via Tsuen Wan and Sha Tin. For both routes, one trip departs towards Disneyland in the mornings and the return trip departs approximately 20 minutes after the evening fireworks display.

In addition to the above regular trips, seven special routes (including one cross-harbour route) operate to and from Disneyland before and after special events at the park, of which two are operated by Citybus and the other five by Long Win Bus.

Certain midday and late evening trips of Citybus route B5 between the Hong Kong–Zhuhai–Macau Bridge Hong Kong Port and Sunny Bay station are routed via Disneyland.

== Criticisms ==
=== 2005/2006 overcrowding problems ===
Just before the grand opening, the park was criticised for overestimating the daily capacity. The problem became apparent on the charity preview day on 4 September 2005, when 30,000 locals visited the park. The event turned out to be a disappointment, as there were too many guests. Wait times at fast food outlets were at least 45 minutes, and wait times at rides went up to 2 hours.

Although the park's shareholders and the Hong Kong Government set pressure upon the park to lower the capacity, the park insisted on keeping the limit, only agreeing to relieve the capacity problem by extending the opening time by one hour and introducing more discounts during weekdays. However, the park stated that local visitors tend to stay in the park for more than nine hours per visit, implying that the mentioned practices would do little to solve the problem.

During the Lunar New Year 2006, many visitors arrived at the park in the morning bearing valid tickets, but were refused entry, because the park was already at full capacity. Some disgruntled visitors, mainly tourists, attempted to force their way into the park by climbing over the barrier gates. Disneyland management was forced to revise their ticketing policy and designated future periods close to public holidays as 'special days' during which admission would only be allowed through a date-specific ticket. Ticket prices during the week were changed to reflect cheaper prices. Meanwhile, weekend prices were raised. The prices were changed in an attempt to crowd-control so the crowds would be more even throughout the week and therefore the lines would not be as bad on weekends.

== Public relations ==
On 24 November 2005, the park's 100th day of operations, Disney announced that the park had well over 1 million guests during its first two months of operation.

In response to negative publicity locally and to boost visitor numbers, Hong Kong Disneyland offered $50 discounts for admission tickets to holders of Hong Kong I.D. cards in the period before 2005 Christmas. Also, from March to June 2006, the park offered Hong Kong I.D. card holders the opportunity to purchase a two-day admission ticket for the price of a single day ticket.

== Attendance ==
Worldwide Rank	Year	Attendance	Net change	% Change
16	2006	5,200,000		
21	2007	4,150,000	−1,050,000	–20.1
18	2008	4,500,000	+350,000	+8.4
17	2009	4,600,000	+100,000	+2.2
16	2010	5,200,000	+600,000	+13
15	2011	5,900,000	+700,000	+13.5
14	2012	6,700,000	+800,000	+13.6
14	2013	7,400,000	+700,000	+10.4
15	2014	7,600,000	+200,000	+2.7
19	2015	6,800,000	–800,000	–9.3
17	2016	6,100,000	–700,000	–10.3
18	2017	6,200,000	+100,000	+1.6
16	2018	6,700,000	+500,000	+8.1
21	2019	5,695,000	–1,005,000	–15.7
22	2020	1,700,000	–3,995,000	–70.1
33	2021	2,800,000	+1,100,000	+64.7
34	2022	3,400,000	+600,000	+21.4
17	2023	6,400,000	+3,000,000	+88.2
17	2024	7,936,000	+251,000	+3.3

The significant decline in attendance between 2020 and 2023 is due to the COVID-19 regulations imposed in Hong Kong, which included, during several periods, temporary closure of the Resort, reduction in park capacity, quarantine measures and vaccinations required for visitors entering Hong Kong.

== In popular culture ==
In the 2012 Indian Tamil-language musical romantic comedy film Podaa Podi, a song depicting the relationship between a father and son, written by Vaali and sung by Silambarasan himself, was shot with him and his 1 year old nephew Samarth at Hong Kong Disneyland, making it the first Tamil film to be shot there.

The hit Indian sitcom Taarak Mehta Ka Ooltah Chashmah filmed episodes 1470 to 1478 at Hong Kong Disneyland, where various show characters experienced the attractions.

The final two episodes of the Philippine TV series Langit Lupa took place in the park.

The music video for the song "Boss" by Mirror was filmed at Hong Kong Disneyland in 2021.

The Philippine film Call Me Mother became the first Southeast Asian film and third film globally to be filmed at Hong Kong Disneyland in 2025.

== See also ==
- Tokyo Disneyland
- Shanghai Disneyland
- List of lands at Disney theme parks
