= The Golden Mickeys =

Show

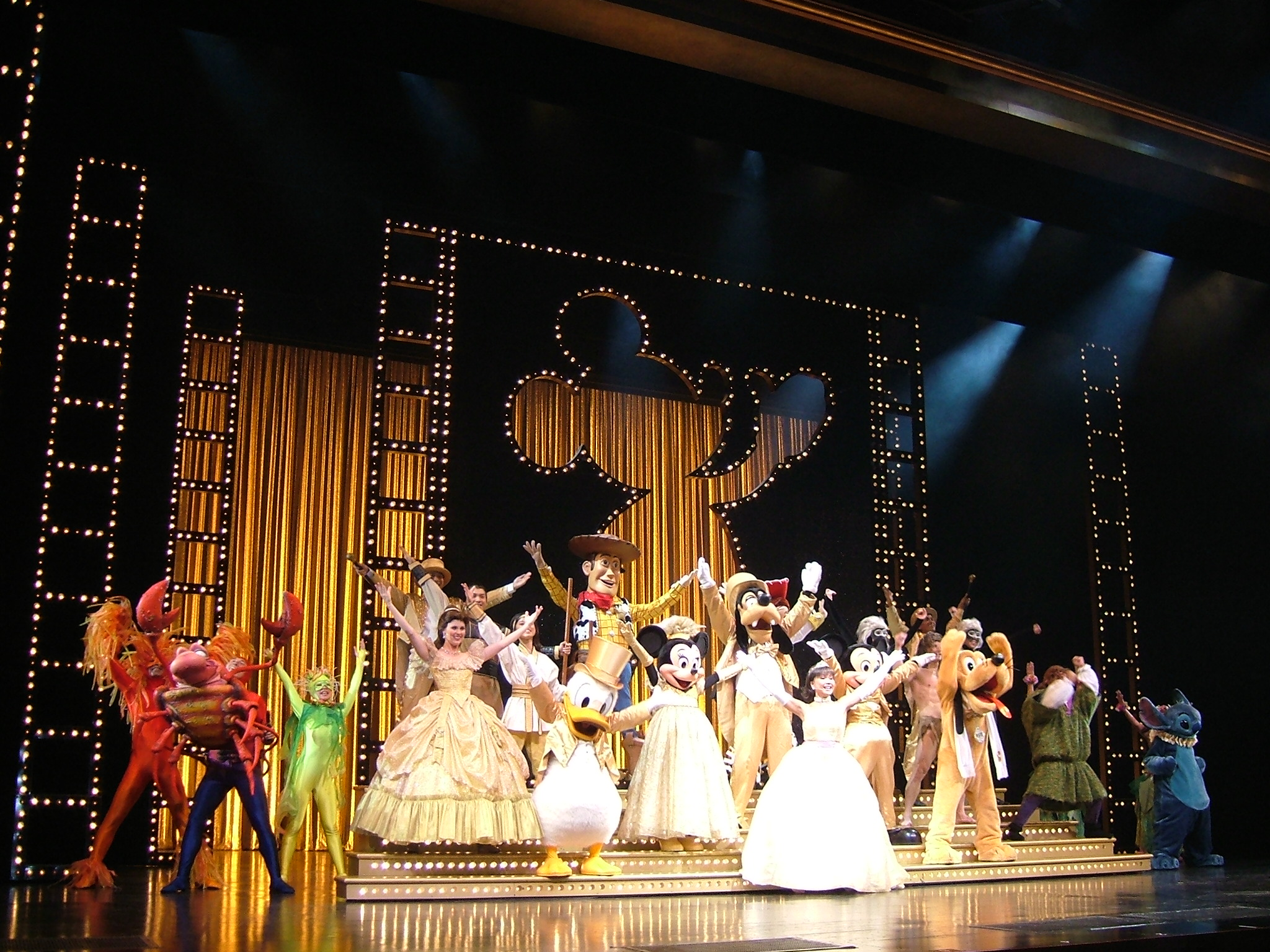
- The Golden Mickeys at Hong Kong Disneyland

Disney Cruise Line
- Area: Disney Wonder/Disney Dream
- Status: Operating
- Opening date: September 2003

Hong Kong Disneyland
- Area: Fantasyland
- Status: Removed
- Opening date: September 12, 2005
- Closing date: July 26, 2015
- Replaced by: Mickey and the Wondrous Book

Ride statistics
- Attraction type: Musical
- Theme: Disney Animated Films
- Duration: 25 minutes (The Golden Mickeys: 25th Anniversary Edition version); 31 minutes (Christmas version)

The Golden Mickeys (Cantonese: 《米奇金獎音樂劇》) is a stage musical presented in the format of an awards show, featuring characters from various Disney films. This revue-style production first appeared on the Disney Cruise Line, debuting in September 2003 on the Disney Wonder, replacing the show Morty the Magician. In the fall of 2011, the show was added to the Disney Dream during the ship's opening period. Performances are held in the Walt Disney Theater, located on Deck 4 of the ship.

The Golden Mickeys made its first appearance on land at Hong Kong Disneyland. The show concluded its run on July 26, 2015, to make way for the new show Mickey and the Wondrous Book. This production premiered in November 2015 as part of the park's 10th-anniversary celebrations.

== Disney Cruise Line version ==
In the entertainment program aboard Cruise Ships, a fictional narrative is presented featuring a character named "Ensign Benson." Portrayed as a reserved member of the crew, Benson unexpectedly takes on the responsibilities of a host when the designated host, implied to be the ship's captain, is absent at the commencement of the show. In her newly assumed role, which she undertakes with a lack of self-assurance, Benson receives motivational support from a series of interactive video clips featuring real-life celebrities. Additionally, her involvement extends to participating in various song and dance performances that are part of the show. These feature cast members in the costumes of characters from Snow White and the Seven Dwarfs, The Hunchback of Notre Dame, Tarzan, Mulan, One Hundred and One Dalmatians, Toy Story, Lady and the Tramp, Sleeping Beauty, Pocahontas, and The Lion King performing songs from these films. In 2011 the program removed the songs and characters from Sleeping Beauty and Pocahontas, moving them to Disney's Believe that year. Subsequently, The Golden Mickeys included both classic and new songs from movies such as The Little Mermaid, Beauty and the Beast, Tangled, The Princess and the Frog and Coco.

In the vicinity of the Walt Disney Theater, the pre-show area is designed to emulate a red carpet experience, immersing guests in the typical environment associated with celebrities. "Rona Rivers" interviews guests at the entrance of the theater, simulating the experience of a celebrity interview on the red carpet. This interaction is displayed live on two large screens at the front of the theater, adding to the overall atmosphere. The original ensemble of performers at the theater comprised Nadia Wahhab, Crystal Monee Hall, Mark Baratelli, Jeremiah James, Joshua Carlson, Danny Calvert, Tony Wichowski, Erik McEwen, Jessica Quarles, Emma Green, Jonathan Vetsich, and Michele Kaye. The Golden Mickeys was directed by Diane Paulus, who directed The Donkey Show in New York City, and choreographed by Maria Torres, who co-choreographed Disney's Enchanted.

=== Show Soundtrack (2028 Updated Version) ===
- Opening Number
  - Tonight is the Night
- Classic
  - When You Wish Upon a Star (Pinocchio)
- Heroism
  - Let it Go (Frozen)
  - How Far I'll Go (Moana)
  - Touch the Sky (Brave)
- Comedy
  - I2I (A Goofy Movie)
- Villains
  - Cruella De Vil (101 Dalmatians)
- Friendship
  - You've Got a Friend in Me (Toy Story)
- Romance
  - Bella Notte (Lady and the Tramp)
  - Once Upon a Dream (Sleeping Beauty)
  - I See the Light (Tangled)
  - Remember Me (Coco)
- Finale
  - Who Knows Where a Dream Might Lead

== Hong Kong Disneyland version ==
A version of the show was performed at the Storybook Theatre in the Fantasyland area of Hong Kong Disneyland. The show was narrated in Cantonese, with English and Simplified Chinese subtitles. All of the songs were performed in English. Here, the show began with a performance of the title song including a dance performance based around cast members preparing costumes and taking press photos of arriving celebrities. Footage of Disney characters arriving by limousine and entering the theater along a red carpet was then projected on screens to the two sides of the stage before the characters entered through the auditorium aisle. This version of the show had a running commentary from the host Bebe who conducted interviews with Mickey Mouse and Minnie Mouse, along with Goofy, Donald Duck, and Pluto and was also involved in several of the song and dance routines. These featured cast members in the costumes of characters from Toy Story 2, The Hunchback of Notre Dame, Tarzan, Mulan, Lilo & Stitch, The Little Mermaid and Beauty and the Beast performing songs from these films. The show also included aerial acrobatics, martial arts, puppetry, and fireworks.

On July 26, 2015, the show took its final bow to make way for the show "Mickey and the Wondrous Book", which debuted in November 2015, to celebrate the park's 10th anniversary. Original cast members Angela Lam, Andy Au, and Regrine Law, who had continued to perform until the last day, were celebrated in a special farewell moment following the conclusion of the performance.

=== Show Soundtrack ===
- The Golden Mickeys Song
- Friendship
  - You've Got a Friend in Me (Toy Story 2)
- Heroism
  - Out There (The Hunchback of Notre Dame)
  - Son of Man (Tarzan)
  - I'll Make a Man Out of You (Mulan)
- Adventurer
  - Hawaiian Roller Coaster Ride (Lilo & Stitch)
  - Under the Sea (The Little Mermaid)
- Romance
  - Beauty and the Beast
    - Something There
    - Beauty and the Beast Song
- When You Wish Upon a Star / Little Wooden Head (Pinocchio)
- Reprise of The Golden Mickeys Song

On December 13, 2017 "Bebe" made a cameo appearance on "the Christmas Cabaret presented by the Hong Kong Disneyland Entertainment and Costuming Team", a show held once a year to entertain cast members. Bebe did her introduction of the Golden Mickeys with slight changes to fit in the segment "Hong Kong Disneyland Costuming Catwalk Show", and performed Madonna's "Vogue".

== Disney's Hollywood Studios version ==
=== Show Soundtrack ===
- The Golden Mickeys Song
- Friendship
  - You've Got a Friend in Me (Toy Story 2)
- Heroism
  - Out There (The Hunchback of Notre Dame)
  - Son of Man (Tarzan)
  - I'll Make a Man Out of You (Mulan)
- Adventurer
  - Hawaiian Roller Coaster Ride (Lilo & Stitch)
  - Under the Sea (The Little Mermaid)
- Romance
  - Beauty and the Beast
    - Something There
    - Beauty and the Beast Song
- Grand Finale Medley
  - Who Knows Where a Dream Might Lead
  - It's a Small World (After All)
