= Toy Story Land =

Themed area at Disney Parks

- Theme: Toy Story

Disney Adventure World (as Toy Story Playland; part of Worlds of Pixar)
- Coordinates: 48°52′02.46″N 2°46′38.74″E
- Status: Operating
- Opened: August 8, 2010

Hong Kong Disneyland
- Coordinates: 22°18′37.83″N 114°2′21.22″E
- Status: Operating
- Opened: November 17, 2011

Shanghai Disneyland
- Status: Operating
- Opened: April 26, 2018

Disney's Hollywood Studios
- Status: Operating
- Opened: June 30, 2018
- Replaced: Studio Backlot Tour (Streets of America)

Toy Story Land (known as Toy Story Playland at Disney Adventure World) is a themed land at Disney Adventure World (as part of the Worlds of Pixar land), Hong Kong Disneyland, Shanghai Disneyland, and Disney's Hollywood Studios. The area is based on Disney and Pixar's Toy Story franchise.

Toy Story Land in France originally opened as part of Toon Studio in what was then named Walt Disney Studios Park on August 17, 2010, at a cost of €79 million. Toy Story Land in Hong Kong opened on November 17, 2011. Toy Story Land in Shanghai opened on April 26, 2018. Toy Story Land at Disney's Hollywood Studios in Florida was announced on August 15, 2015, at the D23 Expo, and opened on June 30, 2018.

== Disney Adventure World ==
During Mickey's Magical Party in 2009, information was leaked about an expansion at Walt Disney Studios Park; the resort later confirmed this. The new Pixar themed area helped promote Toy Story 3. The area is designed to "shrink the guest" down to being the size of a toy, and to play in Andy's Backyard with his toys. It had to do this through using highly immersive theming, using bamboo to act as giant blades of grass surrounding the area, the use of many themed props and characters from the Toy Story films such as a giant Buzz Lightyear, a giant Rex, an oversized paper plane and a large ball from the first Pixar short, Luxo Jr. The area also features numerous photo opportunities. Construction of the area started in late 2009 and was finished on time. The area is located on the right side of the park, behind the Art of Disney Animation.

=== Attractions and entertainment ===
- RC Racer
- Slinky Dog Zigzag Spin
- Toy Soldiers Parachute Drop

=== Former attractions and entertainment ===
- Green Army Men Meet & Play

=== Shops ===
- Toy Story Playland Boutique

== Hong Kong Disneyland ==
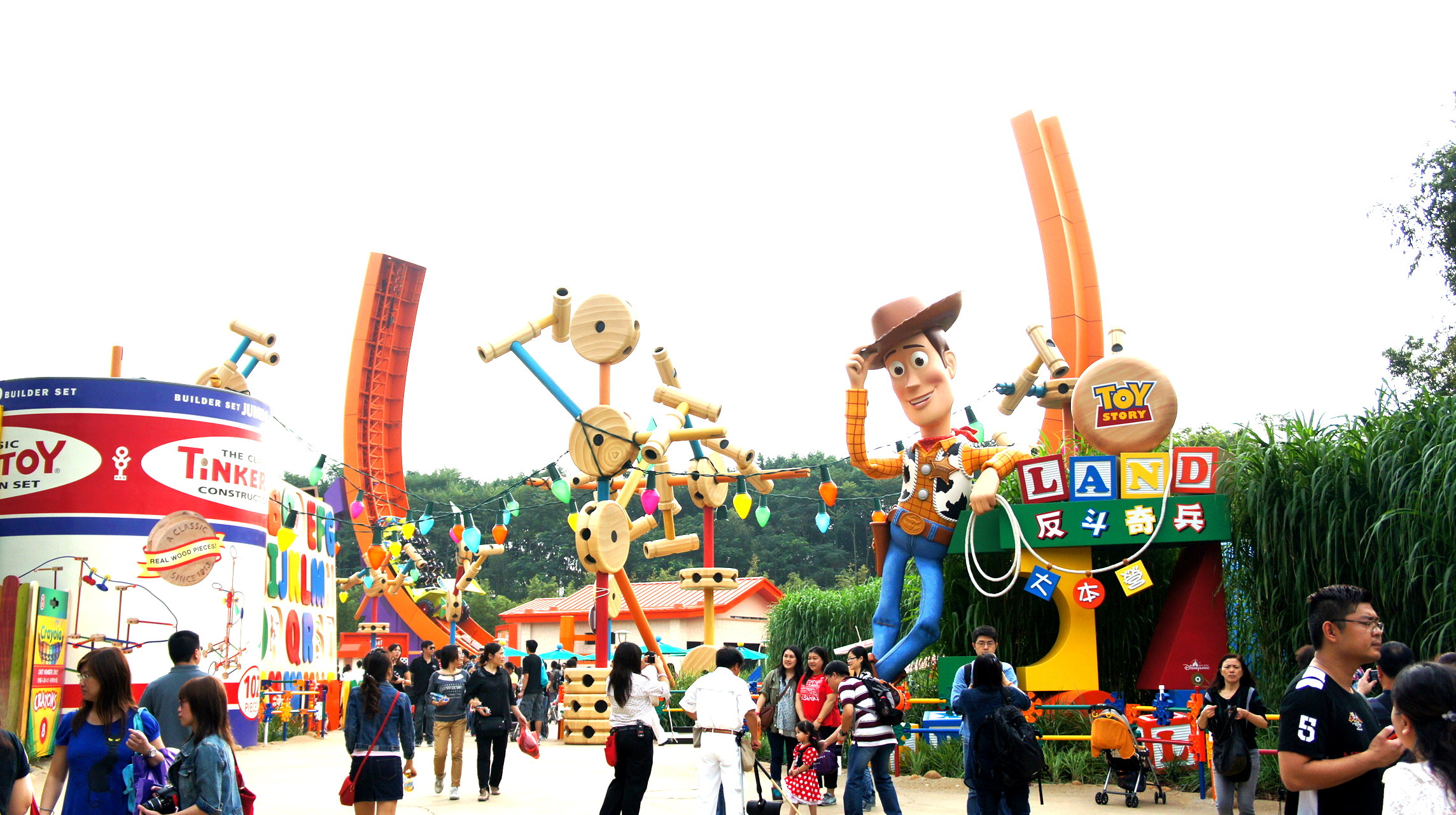
Toy Story Land entrance at Hong Kong Disneyland

Hong Kong Disneyland features an almost identical land, named simply Toy Story Land (Traditional Chinese: 反斗奇兵大本營). This expansion area is exclusive within Asia to Hong Kong for five years from the date of its opening. The land is themed identically; using bamboo to act as giant blades of grass surrounding the area, the use of many themed props and characters from the Toy Story films such as a giant Woody, a giant Rex, an oversized paper plane and also a large ball from the first Pixar short, Luxo Jr. The land opened on November 18, 2011. The land is located to the west side of Hong Kong Disneyland, behind Fantasyland.

On February 6, 2013, a new shop named Andy's Toy Box has been opened, next to RC Racer.

=== Attractions and entertainment ===
- Barrel of Fun
- Cubot
- RC Racer
- Slinky Dog Spin
- Toy Soldier Boot Camp
- Toy Soldiers Parachute Drop

=== Future Attractions and entertainment ===
- Ultimate Pixar Adventure (Opening of Half in 2027)

=== Restaurants and refreshments ===
- Jessie's Snack Roundup
- Frozen Lollipops Cart

=== Shops ===
- Andy's Engine
- Andy's Toy Box

== Shanghai Disneyland ==
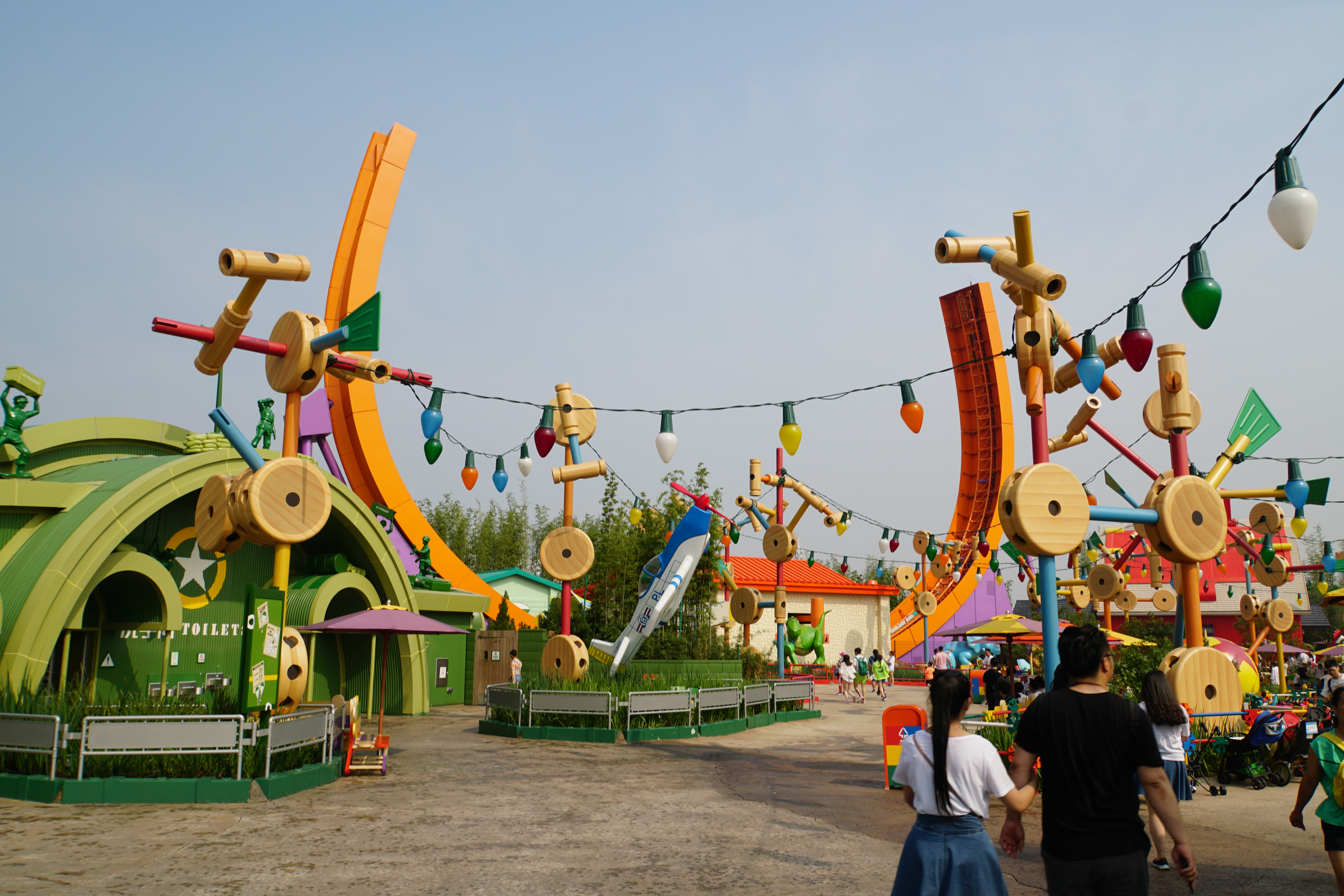
The area (featuring Rex's Racers) in 2018.

Disney·Pixar Toy Story Land was announced for the park on November 9, 2016, when Bob Iger, chairman and chief executive officer of The Walt Disney Company, along with Bob Chapek, chairman of Walt Disney Parks and Resorts, and Fan Xiping, chairman of Shanghai Shendi Group, celebrated breaking ground on the new expansion. The land opened on April 26, 2018.

Toy Story Land at Shanghai Disneyland is located between Tomorrowland and Fantasyland. The land features three attractions and a themed character greeting area.

=== Attractions and entertainment ===
- Rex's Racers
- Slinky Dog Spin
- Woody's Round-Up – an attraction similar to Mater's Junkyard Jamboree at Disney California Adventure, themed around Woody and Bullseye.

=== Restaurants and refreshments ===
- Toy Box Cafe
  - The Box of Buzz Lightyear
  - The Box of Lotso
  - The Box of Mr. and Mrs. Potato Head

=== Shops ===
- Al's Toy Barn

== Disney's Hollywood Studios ==
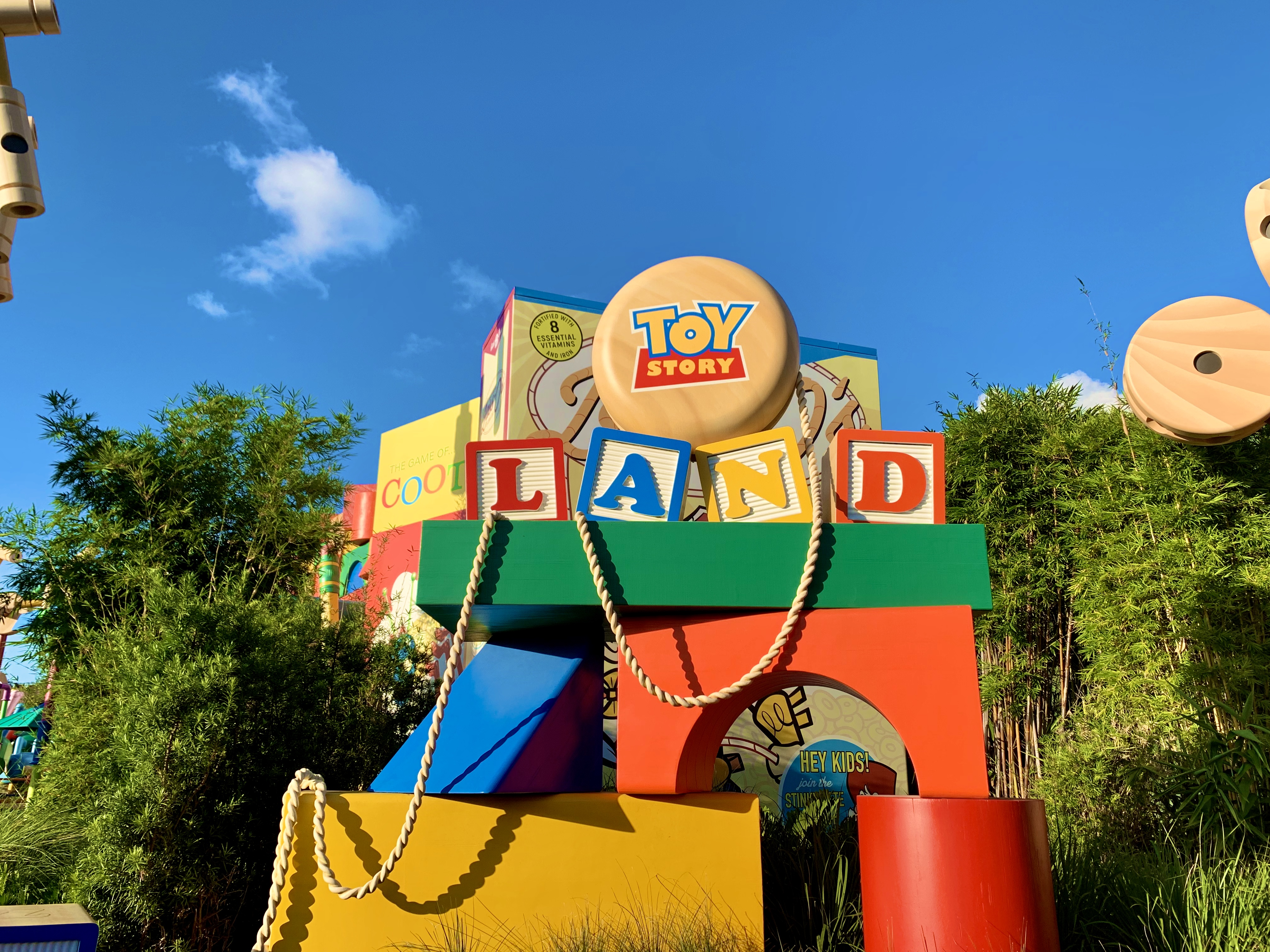
The area's entrance in Disney's Hollywood Studios.

Toy Story Land was announced for the park at the 2015 D23 Expo, roughly 11 acres (4.5 ha) and features a different attraction lineup, including a new entrance for the expanded Toy Story Mania! The other attractions include a Slinky Dog themed family coaster and an attraction based around The Claw and the Little Green Aliens. Construction began on April 3, 2016, and the land opened on June 30, 2018. This edition of Toy Story Land is the largest in any Disney park in terms of area.

In September 2026, it was announced that the original version of Alien Swirling Saucers will be temporarily closed to make way for the updated version of the ride, which will be debut on September 25, 2026, with new music and featuring Lilypad from Pixar's 2026 film Toy Story 5.

=== Attractions and entertainment ===
- Toy Story Mania! – a shooting dark ride where riders try to score points by hitting targets with a variety of objects inside a carnival-themed playset. The attraction was originally called Toy Story Midway Mania! and the entrance was located in Pixar Place when the ride opened in 2008, but was moved to Toy Story Land with a new entrance on the land's opening day.
- Slinky Dog Dash – a family-friendly roller coaster where riders are sent flying through Andy's backyard inside of a giant Slinky Dog. The coaster features two launches and an animatronic Wheezy, who serenades riders as their coaster enters the loading area.
- Alien Swirling Saucers: Lilypad's Jams – a flat ride themed around Buzz Lightyear where riders are whipped around a toy playset of outer space in a vehicle driven by one of Buzz's little green aliens. This ride uses similar ride mechanics as Mater's Junkyard Jamboree in Cars Land and Woody's Round-Up in Shanghai Disneyland's version of Toy Story Land.
- Green Army Men Drum Corps – Green Army Men play cadences on a snare drum, bass drum, and tenor drums.
- Character meet-and-greets – Buzz Lightyear nearby the Toy Story Land marquee, Woody outside Toy Story Mania! and Jessie outside Alien Swirling Saucers.

=== Restaurants and refreshments ===
- Woody's Lunch Box – A counter-service restaurant which looks like an old-fashioned lunch box pushed up against a picture book about "Woody's Roundup," a TV show seen in Toy Story 2. The restaurant is sponsored by Babybel.
- Roundup Rodeo BBQ - It was announced in 2019 that a table-service Toy Story-themed restaurant will be built with an opening date of 2020. In January 2022, the restaurant was reconfirmed to be opening, with an announced date of later in 2022. However, Disney's Hollywood Studios announced that the restaurant was delayed to March 23, 2023, as part of Walt Disney World's 50th Anniversary celebration and the Disney 100 Years of Wonder celebration.
- Popcorn and Snacks – A new snacks kiosk and a full menu, including Pizza Planet Spring Rolls, along with popcorn, plus other snacks, beverages, and alcoholic drinks.

=== Shops ===
- Jessie's Trading Post

== Characters ==
- Woody
- Buzz Lightyear (Wears a Santa Claus hat during Christmas)
- Jessie
