= RC Racer =

Steel shuttle roller coaster

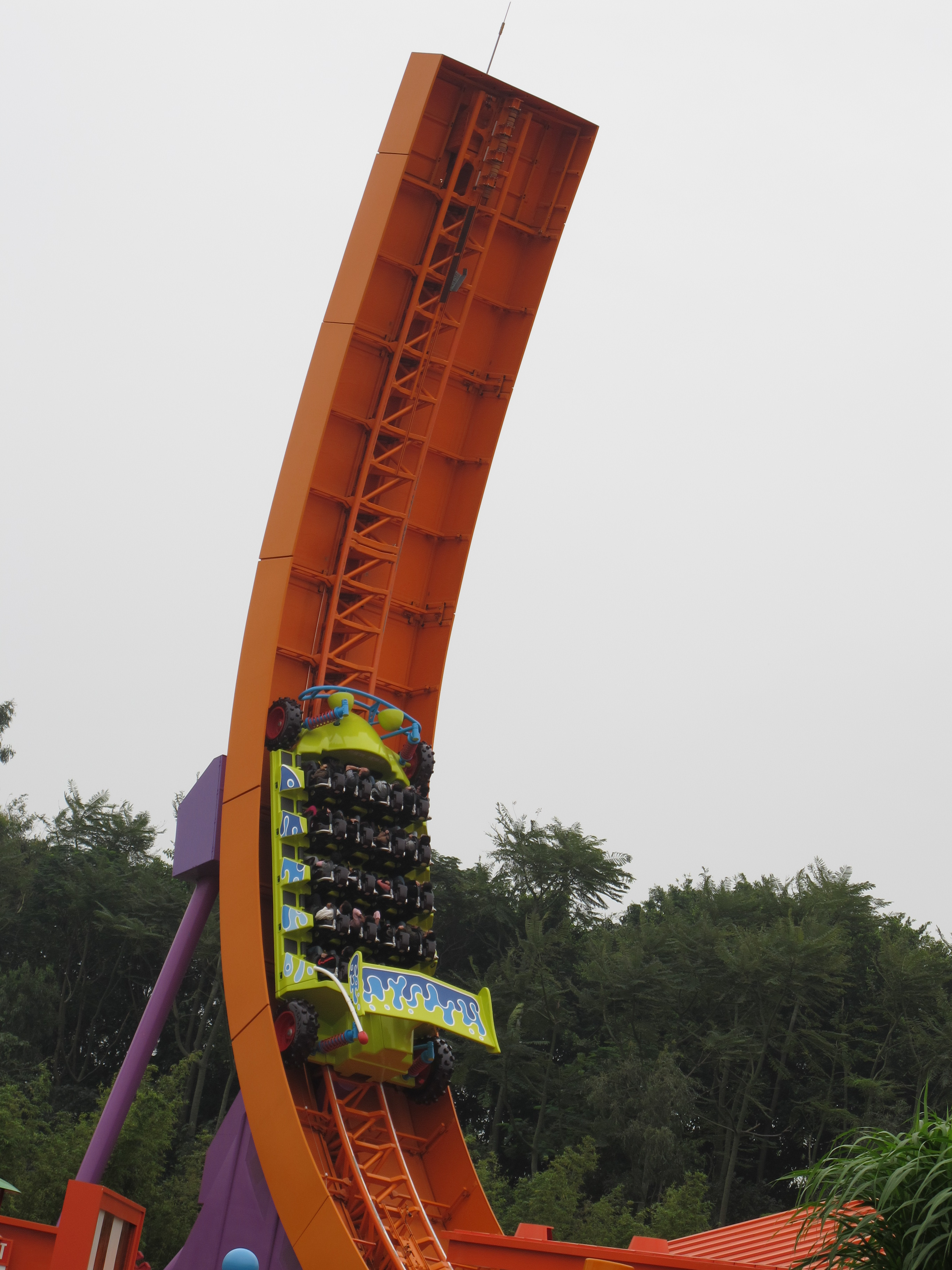
- RC Racer at Hong Kong Disneyland

Disney Adventure World
- Park section: Worlds of Pixar - Toy Story Playland
- Coordinates: 48°52′02.46″N 2°46′38.74″E
- Status: Operating
- Opening date: August 17, 2010
- RC Racer at Disney Adventure World at RCDB

Hong Kong Disneyland
- Park section: Toy Story Land
- Coordinates: 22.310354°N 114.039326°E
- Status: Operating
- Opening date: November 17, 2011
- RC Racer at Hong Kong Disneyland at RCDB

Shanghai Disneyland
- Name: Rex's Racer
- Park section: Disney·Pixar Toy Story Land
- Coordinates: 31.145617°N 121.652228°E
- Status: Operating
- Opening date: April 26, 2018
- Rex's Racer at Shanghai Disneyland at RCDB

General statistics
- Type: Steel – Shuttle – Launched
- Manufacturer: Intamin
- Designer: Walt Disney Imagineering
- Model: Half Pipe Coaster
- Track layout: Hot Wheels
- Lift/launch system: LSM
- Height: 25 m (82 ft)
- Length: 82 m (269 ft)
- Inversions: 0
- Height restriction: 120 cm (3 ft 11 in)
- Trains: Single train with a single car; riders arranged 4 across in 5 rows for a total of 20 riders per train
- Theme: Toy Story
- Restraints: Over-the-shoulder with a belt between the legs
- Single rider line available at Disney Adventure World
- Must transfer from wheelchair

RC Racer (Chinese: 沖天遙控車; known as Rex's Racer in Shanghai) is a steel shuttle roller coaster operating at Disney Adventure World in France, Hong Kong Disneyland, and Shanghai Disneyland. Manufactured by Intamin, the ride is part of the Toy Story Playland in France, Toy Story Land in Hong Kong, and Toy Story Land in Shanghai. The ride in France opened on August 17, 2010, while the Hong Kong installation opened on November 17, 2011, and the Shanghai ride opened on April 26, 2018. It was the second roller coaster in Hong Kong Disneyland and Shanghai Disneyland, and the third roller coaster in Disney Adventure World.

== Attraction ==
In Disney Adventure World, the ride is located at the back of Toy Story Playland, amongst mature trees, which double as overgrown bushes in the Toy Story universe. The ride vehicle is themed after the RC toy car character from the film series, while the track is designed to look like an orange racetrack playset. Guests in the ride vehicle are propelled forwards and backwards through the station building in a semicircular half-pipe part of the track, building up enough speed in the process to hit the top height of approximately 82 feet (25 meters).

== See also ==
- List of Hong Kong Disneyland attractions
- 2011 in amusement parks
