= Mystic Point =

Section in Hong Kong Disneyland

Mystic Manor
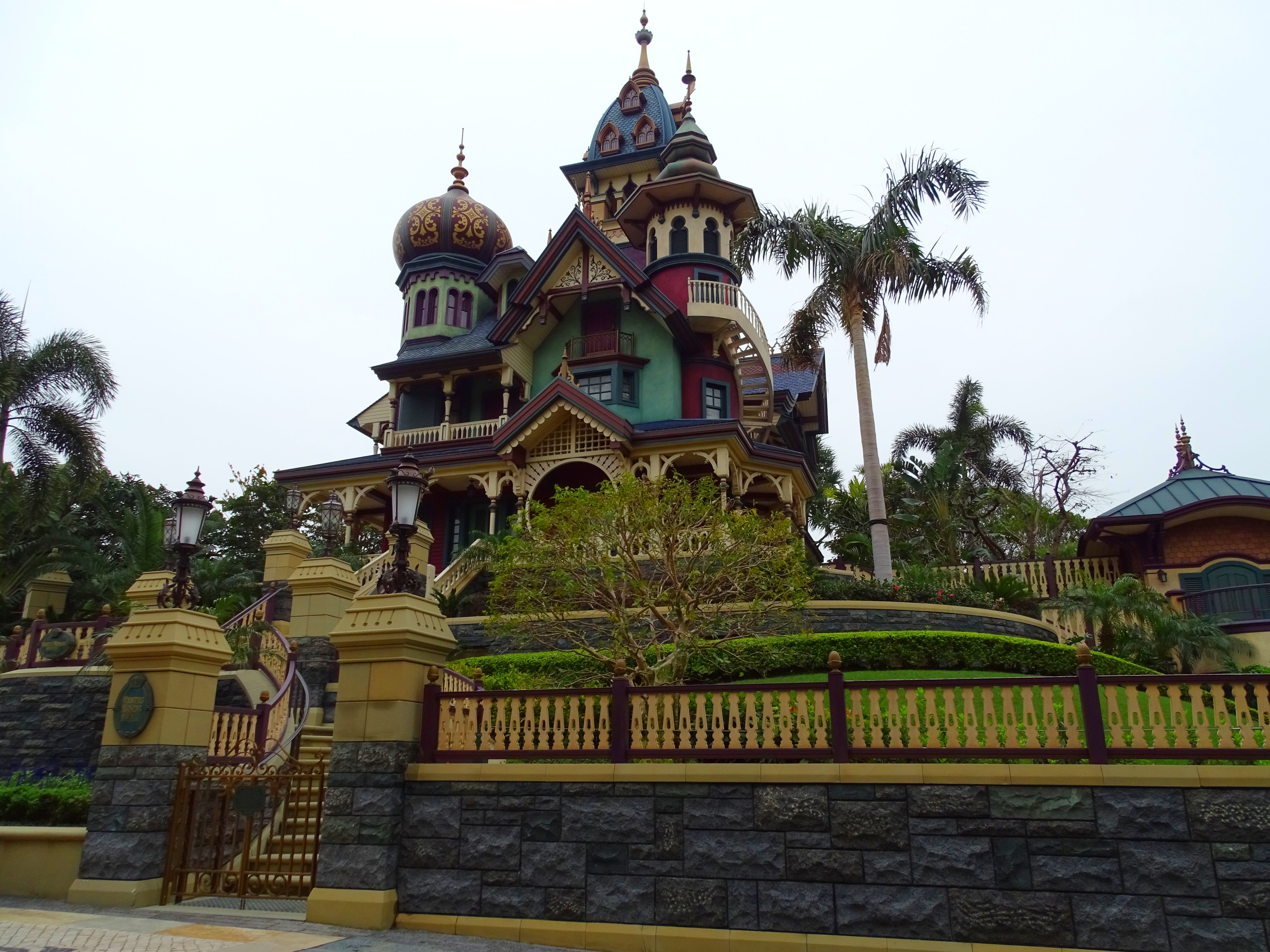
- Mystic Manor
- Interactive map of Mystic Manor
- Coordinates: 22°18′48″N 114°02′36″E
- Theme: Early-1900s British manor set in a tropical rainforest

Hong Kong Disneyland
- Status: Operating
- Opened: May 17, 2013

Mystic Point (Chinese: 迷離莊園) is a section of Hong Kong Disneyland that officially opened to the public on 17 May 2013. Prior to that it had a soft opening for a selected audience. It is set in a dense, uncharted rain forest surrounded by mysterious forces and supernatural events. The site features Mystic Manor, a Haunted Mansion style attraction with the same trackless ride system developed at Pooh's Hunny Hunt in Tokyo Disneyland. Mystic Point, along with Grizzly Gulch has been exclusive to Hong Kong Disneyland among all Disney theme parks since opening. Composer Danny Elfman scored the music for the Mystic Manor dark ride attraction. It is the final land to open in Hong Kong Disneyland's three land expansion plan approved in July 2009.

== Storyline ==
Opened to the public on January 1, 1896, Mystic Point is the site of mysterious forces and supernatural events in the heart of a dense, uncharted rain forest in Papua New Guinea. It is the home of Lord Henry Mystic, a member of the Society of Explorers and Adventurers and his traveling companion, a monkey named Albert. As Imagineer Mark Schrimer tells the story in an interview at Inside the Magic.net:

On one of his expeditions he basically fell in love with this location - this uncharted tropical wilderness - and wanted to stake his claim, make his home there. So he cleared out part of the jungle along the river bank and built this Victorian manor. He's obviously a well to-do British gentleman and he wanted a little bit of home in this tropical wilderness. He started with the essence of a Victorian manor but of course wanted to embellish it with all the different places that he's been. So it's this eclectic Victorian manor sitting in this cleared out jungle along the river.

While he was there, that's where he met and actually rescued his traveling companion, a young monkey that he named Albert, after one of his beloved uncles. Between finding this location and meeting his now lifelong pal and companion Albert, this is really the essence of Mystic Point.

Continuing that idea through, we wanted to tell the story about his collection. Anyone willing to make this hard journey and stumble on or find Mystic Point, he - being kind of a philanthropic character - wanted to open the doors of his home to showcase his collection. And that's what guests are coming to Mystic Point for, to showcase and be able to view the collection and also meet Lord Henry and Albert.

== Attractions and entertainment ==
- Mystic Manor
- Garden of Wonders
- Mystic Point Freight Depot

== Restaurants and refreshments ==
- Explorer's Club Restaurant
- Frozen Lollipops Cart

== Shops ==
- The Archive Shop
