= Bay Lake =

Bay Lake may refer to:

- Bay Lake (Florida), a lake in Florida on the Walt Disney World Property
  - Bay Lake, Florida, an incorporated community named after the lake
- Bay Lake (Minnesota), a lake in Minnesota's Brainerd Lakes region
  - Bay Lake Township, Minnesota, a community surrounding Bay Lake
- Laguna de Bay, Philippines
