= Alien Swirling Saucers =

Ride at Disney's Hollywood Studios

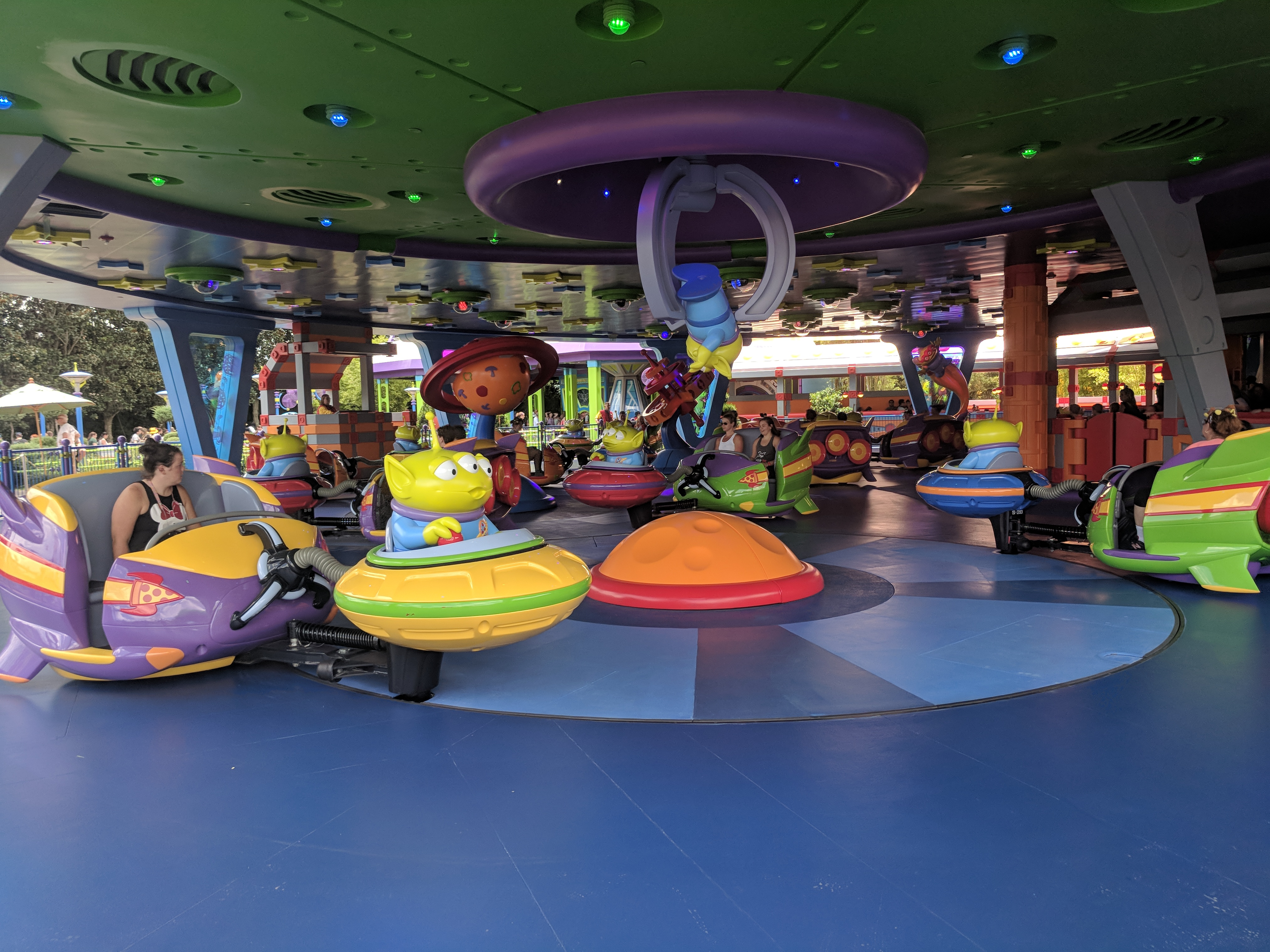

Disney's Hollywood Studios
- Name: Alien Swirling Saucers: Lilypad's Jams (2026–present)
- Area: Toy Story Land
- Status: Operating
- Opening date: June 30, 2018

Ride statistics
- Attraction type: Spinning
- Manufacturer: Zamperla
- Theme: Toy Story
- Music: Musical mix inspired by compositions of Randy Newman
- Height restriction: 32 in (81 cm)
- Ride hosts: Aliens; Lilypad (2026–present)
- Lightning Lane Available
- Must transfer from wheelchair

Alien Swirling Saucers is a spinning ride at Toy Story Land in Disney's Hollywood Studios. First announced at the 2015 D23 Expo, it opened on June 30, 2018, as part of the area's opening.

Alien Swirling Saucers uses the same ride system that powers Disney California Adventure's Mater's Junkyard Jamboree and Tokyo Disneyland's The Happy Ride with Baymax. The ride system shares similarities to the classic "Cuddle Up" ride from Philadelphia Toboggan Company and the classic Whip ride from William F. Mangels. It was manufactured by Zamperla. The attraction is themed as a play set that Andy won at Pizza Planet.

The attraction was to be constructed in Walt Disney Studios Park's (now Disney Adventure World) Toy Story Playland at Disneyland Paris, as part of the park's $2 billion expansion, after it was announced in 2018, however, more recent concept art has silently cancelled its inclusion in the expansion.

In September 2026, an updated version of the ride was announced, which debuted on September 25, 2026, with new music and featuring Lilypad from Pixar's 2026 film Toy Story 5. On October 6, 2026, a new holiday overlay of the ride was announced, with four new holiday songs, running from November 4, 2026 to January 6, 2027 at Disney's Hollywood Studios.

== Voice Cast ==
- Jeff Pidgeon - Aliens
- Greta Lee - Lilypad
