= Slinky Dog Zigzag Spin =

Caterpillar-style ride

Coordinates: 48.8672°N 2.7769°E

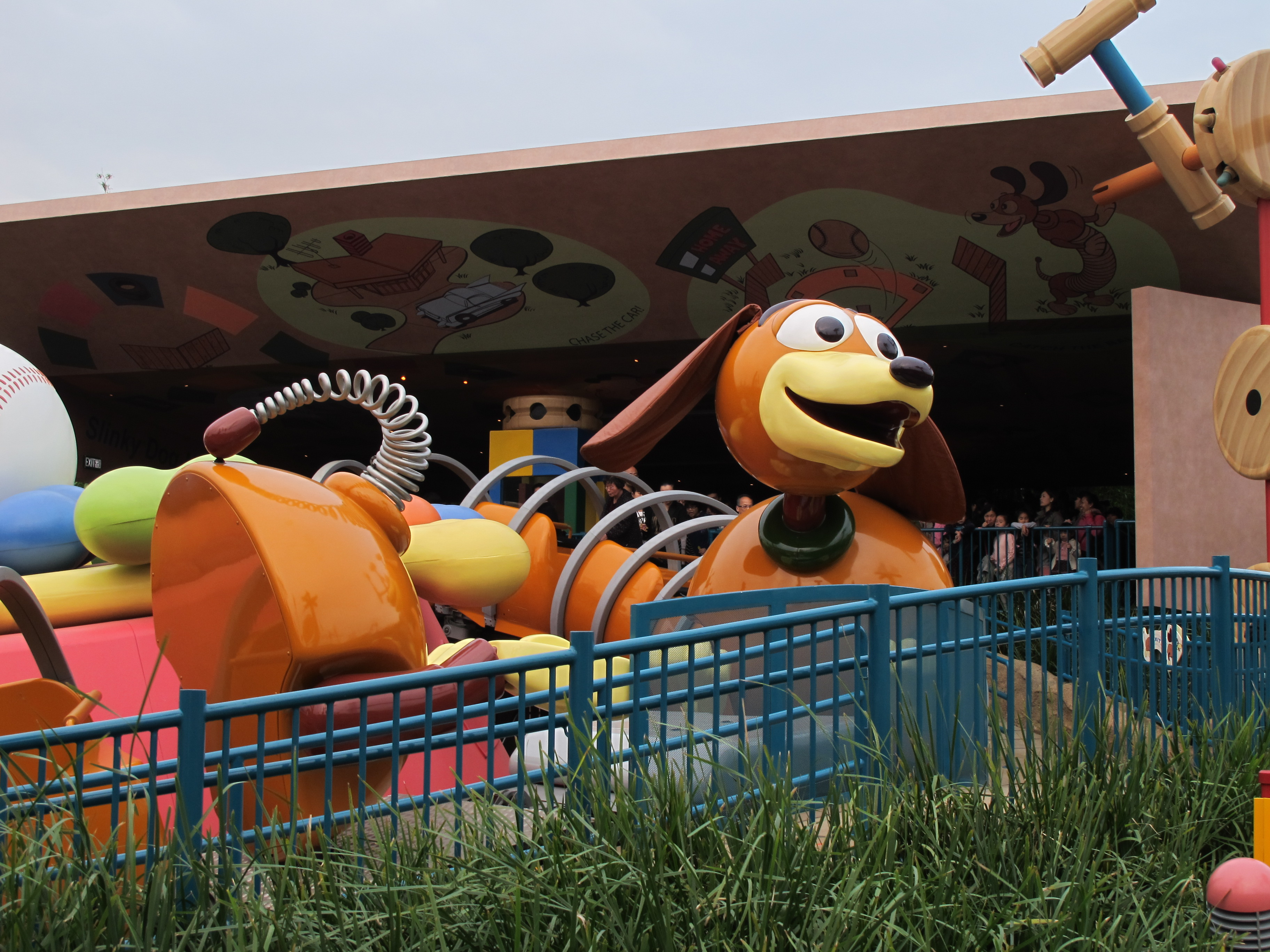
- Slinky Dog Spin at Hong Kong Disneyland

Disney Adventure World
- Area: Toy Story Playland
- Status: Operating
- Opening date: August 17, 2010

Hong Kong Disneyland
- Name: Slinky Dog Spin
- Area: Toy Story Land
- Status: Operating
- Opening date: November 17, 2011

Shanghai Disneyland Park
- Name: Slinky Dog Spin
- Area: Disney·Pixar Toy Story Land
- Status: Operating
- Opening date: April 26, 2018

Ride statistics
- Attraction type: Caterpillar ride
- Manufacturer: Intamin
- Designer: Walt Disney Imagineering
- Theme: Toy Story
- Disney Premier Access available at Walt Disney Studios Park
- Single rider line available at Walt Disney Studios Park

Slinky Dog Zigzag Spin (also known as Slinky Dog Spin) is a Caterpillar-style ride at Disney Adventure World in France, Hong Kong Disneyland, and Shanghai Disneyland Park. The ride is part of Toy Story Playland in France, and Toy Story Land in Hong Kong and Shanghai. The France ride opened on August 17, 2010; the Hong Kong installation opened on November 17, 2011; and the Shanghai ride opened on April 26, 2018. The ride and its queue are themed to an authentic "Collector's Edition" Slinky Dog, complete with original 1950s cardboard box.

== Ride experience ==
=== Queue ===
Entering a queue line formed out of Lincoln Logs building blocks, visitors eventually step inside the giant box itself, which has a retro-styled boardgame printed on its inside.

=== Ride ===
The Slinky Dog train is connected end-to-end, travelling in a loop around a dog bowl filled with rubber bones and Andy's baseball. It builds up speed to provide a mild thrill. This ride is the tamest attraction in the land, offering a continuous, circular ride up and down a gentle incline. The layout takes advantage of the land's sloping elevation to create the illusion of being shrunk, especially when visitors stand at the foot of the ride, its enormous box towering above, surrounded by oversized grass.

== See also ==
- Hong Kong Disneyland attraction and entertainment history
- 2011 in amusement parks
- Scuttle's Scooters
