= Walt Disney Imagineering =

Research and development unit of The Walt Disney Company

Walt Disney Imagineering Research & Development, Inc.

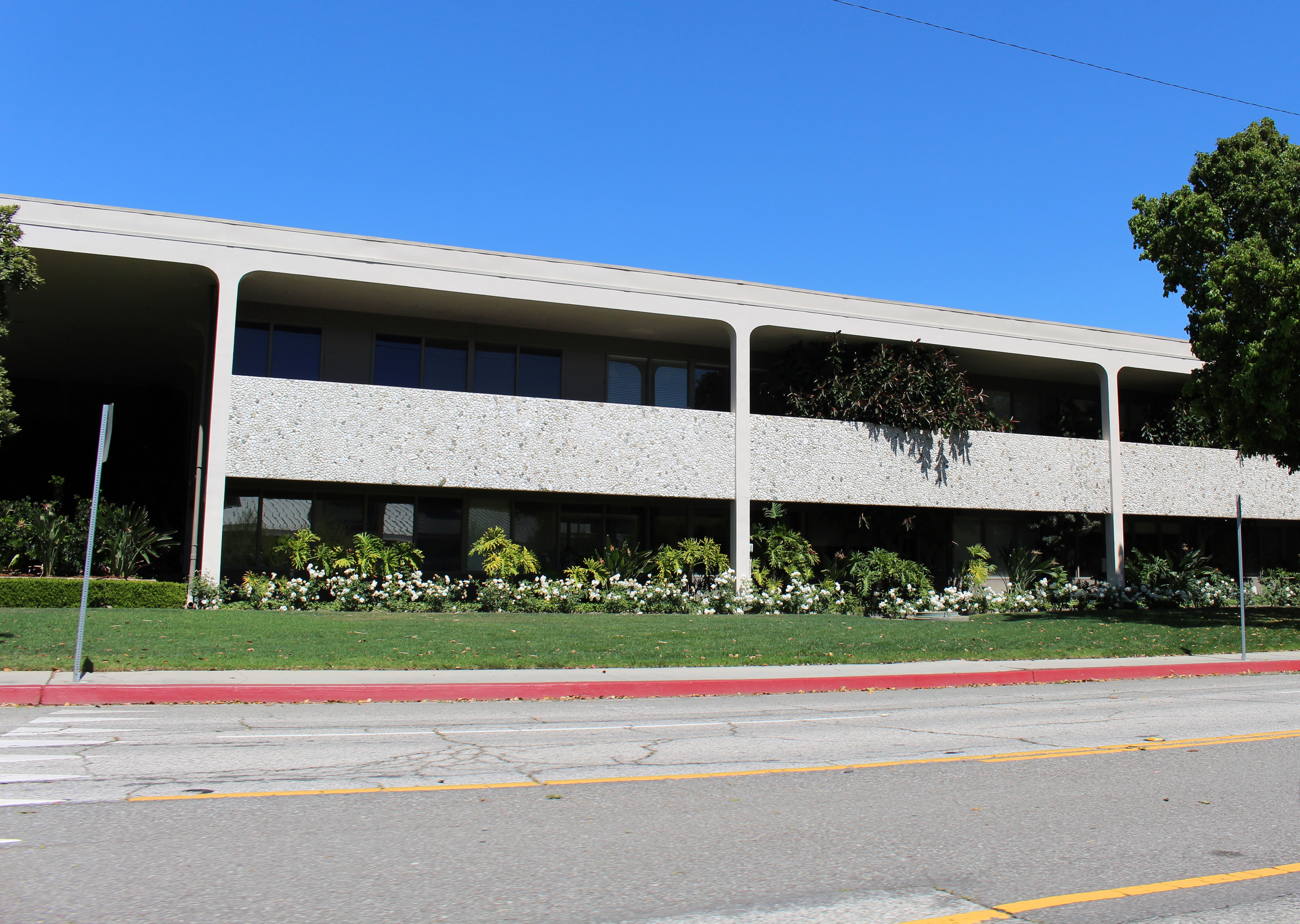
- WDI headquarters in Glendale, California
- Trade name: Walt Disney Imagineering
- Type: Subsidiary
- Industry: Engineering, architecture design
- Founded: December 16, 1952; 73 years ago
- Headquarters: Grand Central Creative Campus, Glendale, California, United States
- Key people: Bruce Vaughn (President and CCO)
- Products: Theme parks; Hotel resorts; Attractions; Cruise ships; Real estate developments; Entertainment venues
- Services: Design; Property management
- Parent: Disney Experiences
- Divisions: Disney Live Entertainment
- Website: Official website

Walt Disney Imagineering Research & Development, Inc.—commonly referred to as Walt Disney Imagineering, Imagineering, or WDI—is the research and development arm of the Walt Disney Company, responsible for the creation, design, and construction of Disney theme parks and attractions worldwide. The company also operates Disney Live Entertainment and the Muppets Studio and manages Disney's properties, from Walt Disney Studios in Burbank to New Amsterdam Theatre and Times Square Studios Ltd. in New York City.

Founded on December 16, 1952 by Walt Disney to oversee the production of Disneyland Park, it was originally known as Walt Disney, Inc., then WED Enterprises, from the initials of "Walter Elias Disney", Disney's full name. Headquartered in Glendale, California, Imagineering is composed of "Imagineers", who are illustrators, architects, engineers, lighting designers, show writers and graphic designers.

Disney filed for a trademark for the term "Imagineering" in 1989, claiming first use of the term in 1962. Imagineering is a registered trademark of Disney Enterprises, Inc.

== History ==
=== WED Enterprises ===
Walt Disney, Inc. (WDI) was formed by Walt Disney on December 16, 1952, with an engineering division tasked with designing Disneyland. In light of objections from his brother Roy O. Disney as well as those of potential stockholders, WDI was renamed WED Enterprises in 1953 based on Disney's initials. In 1961, WED moved into the Grand Central Business Park. WED Enterprises's theme park design and architectural group became so integral to the Disney studio's operations that Walt Disney Productions bought it on February 5, 1965, along with the WED Enterprises name.

=== Imagineering ===
The unit was renamed as of January 1986 to Walt Disney Imagineering. In 1996, Disney Development Company, the Disney conglomerate's real estate development subsidiary, merged into Imagineering.

Imagineering created Disney Fair, a U.S. traveling attraction, which premiered in September 1996. With poor attendance, the fair was pulled after a few stops. Disney Entertainment Projects (Asia Pacific), Inc., a new Disney Asian Pacific subsidiary, selected a renamed fair called DisneyFest as its first project, taking it to Singapore to open there on October 30, 1997.

By 1997, Imagineers were in several buildings in Grand Central Business Park when Disney purchased the park. In September 1999, Disney Imagineering announced the Grand Central Creative Campus redesign of the industrial park with a new office-studio complex anchored by Disney Imagineering. Some of the buildings were demolished to make way for new buildings. The additional space would be for sound stages, production facilities and offices.

As part of the Walt Disney Company's March 2018 strategic reorganization, Walt Disney Parks and Resorts merged with Disney Consumer Products and Interactive Media segments into Disney Parks, Experiences and Products (DPEP), giving Disney Imagineering oversight of merchandise, games and publishing development.

In July 2021, DPEP chairman Josh D'Amaro announced that approximately 2,000 DPEP positions would be transferred over the next couple of years to the Lake Nona area of Orlando, Florida. In November 2021, it was reported that as many as 90% of the positions to be transferred are Walt Disney Imagineering positions, as DPEP relocates Imagineering's headquarters from Glendale to a new 60-acre corporate campus in Lake Nona. The Imagineering positions that were reportedly exempt from relocation were those dedicated to Disneyland or certain international parks. The relocation was reportedly motivated in part by $570 million in tax breaks from the state of Florida, as well as Florida's business-friendly climate, lower cost of living, and lack of a state income tax. This relocation was cancelled in May 2023 amidst a feud with Florida governor Ron DeSantis.

In 2019, the first season of the documentary series The Imagineering Story was released on Disney+. The series details the history of Walt Disney Imagineering and creation of the Disney theme parks around the world. A second season is scheduled to be released in 2028.

== Principles ==
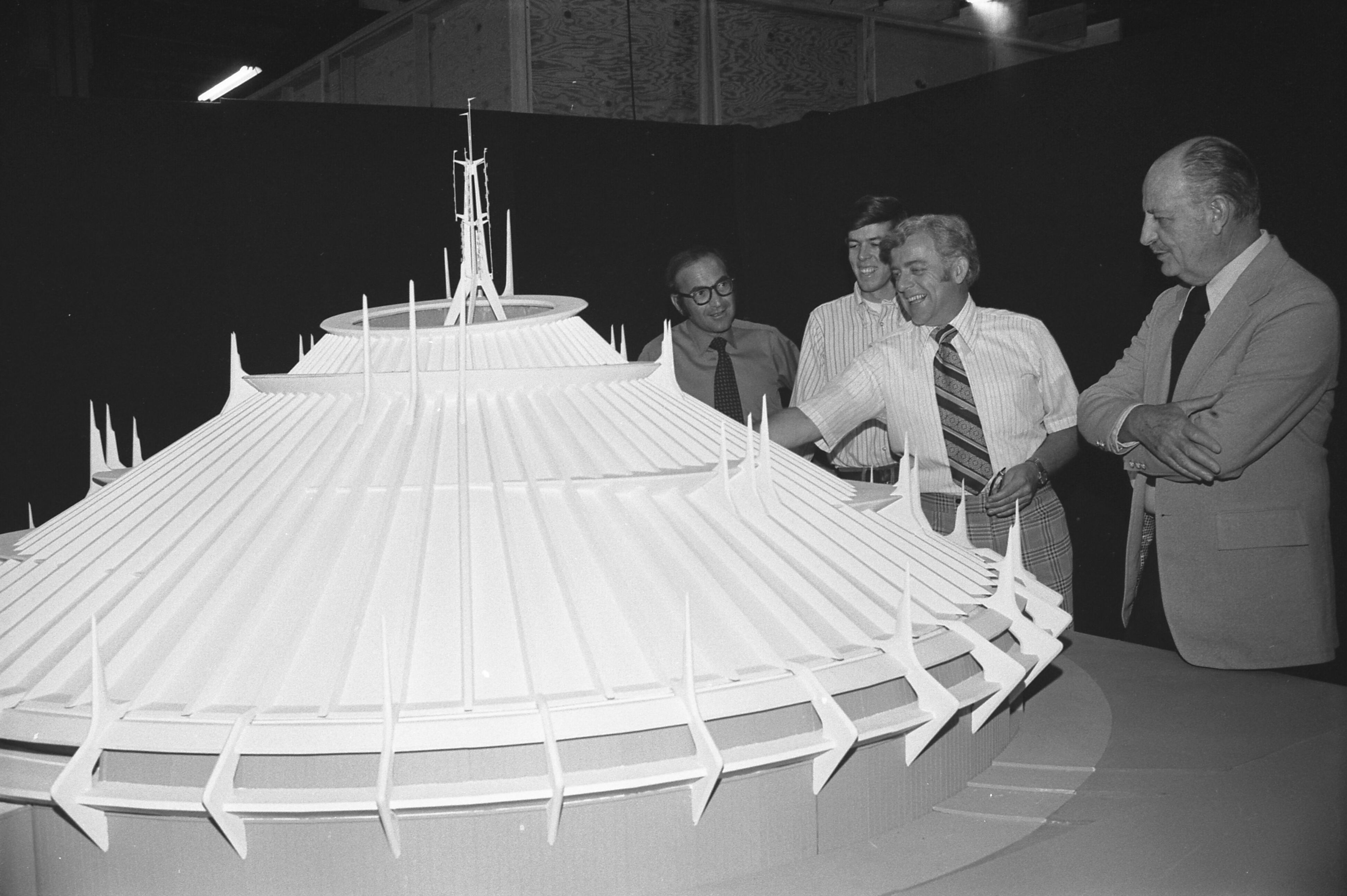
WED Enterprises engineers, including Marty Sklar, Tony Baxter, and John Hench, examining a model for Space Mountain at Magic Kingdom in 1973

New concepts and improvements are often created to fulfill specific needs. For instance, the Soarin' Over California ride system was designed to help guests experience the sensation of flight. During development, Imagineer Mark Sumner found an erector set in his attic, which quickly inspired the solution to create this experience. The ride effectively simulates hang gliding. One of Imagineering's techniques, "blue sky speculation", is a process in which ideas are generated without limitations. Imagineers may develop a bold idea in extreme detail, initially disregarding budgetary or physical constraints. It can take up to five years for an idea to turn into a finished attraction. The company considers this the beginning of a design process, believing, "if it can be dreamt, it can be built".

WDI partnered with the Khan Academy to create a series of online video classes called Imagineering in a Box, to allow students to "explore different aspects of theme park design, from characters to ride development..." The classes, which are organized into three main categories (Creating Worlds, Designing Attractions, and Bringing Characters to Life), are presented by WDI employees using multimedia lessons and exercises.

=== The Imagineering Pyramid ===
Past Disney Imagineers have shared 15 principles of Disney Imagineering, divided into five tiers. These are:

Tier 1: Foundations of Imagineering
1. It All Begins with a Story
2. Creative Intent
3. Attention to Detail
4. Theming
5. Long, Medium, and Close Shots

Tier 2: Wayfinding
6. Wienies
7. Transitions
8. Storyboards
9. Pre-Shows and Post-Shows

Tier 3: Visual Communication
10. Forced Perspective
11. "Read"-ability
12. Kinetics

Tier 4: Making It Memorable
13. The "It's a Small World" Effect
14. Hidden Mickeys

Tier 5: Walt’s Cardinal Rule
15. Plussing

Walt Disney coined the term "plussing" for the process of constantly striving to perfect Imagineering work. Disney believed that there is always room for innovation and improvement, stating, "Disneyland will never be completed as long as there's imagination left in the world." This sometimes takes the form of returning to previously abandoned ideas, such as the rework of the Museum of the Weird wax museum concept into the present The Haunted Mansion.

=== The Art of the Show ===
Disney theme parks are storytelling and visual experiences, also known as “The Art of the Show.” The use of theming, atmosphere, and attention to detail are essential in the Disney experience. Creative director John Hench noted the similarities between theme park design and film making, such as the use of techniques, including forced perspective. One example of forced perspective is Cinderella Castle in Magic Kingdom at Walt Disney World. The scale of architectural elements is much smaller in the upper reaches of the castle compared to the foundation, making it seem significantly taller than its actual height of 189 feet.

The attraction, Pirates of the Caribbean, evokes a “rollicking buccaneer adventure,” according to Hench. In contrast, the Disney Cruise Line ships create an elegant seafaring atmosphere. Minor details in theme park shops and restaurants are crucial; these include the menus, names of the dishes and the Cast Members’ costumes. When guests walk down the area of Main Street, U.S.A., they are likely to notice a bakery fragrance, reminiscent of suburban America in the 1900s. In addition to theme parks, Imagineering has devised retail stores, galleries, and hotels which have "stories" and create a specific mood. For instance, the Disney's Contemporary Resort features an A-frame structure, modern décor and futuristic features including a quiet monorail in the lobby. These details reinforce the hotel's contemporary nature.

In 2010, Disney Educational Products produced a series of videos called The Science of Disney Imagineering. Each video was presented by Imagineer Asa Kalama and focused on a different science subject. Each video featured at least one Disney attraction, to show how science was used in them. These science subjects include Gravity, Trajectory, Levers & Pulleys, Fluids, Energy, Design & Models, Magnetism, Motion, Animal Adaptations: Communication, Friction, and Electricity.

=== Mickey's Ten Commandments ===
In 1991, Marty Sklar (then-president of Imagineering) presented ten commandments attributed to Mickey Steinberg (the vice president of Imagineering). They are:

1. Know your audience
2. Wear your guest's shoes (don't forget the human factors; try to experience the parks from the guests' point of view)
3. Organize the flow of people and ideas (ensure experiences tell a story that is organized and logically laid out)
4. Create a "Wienie" (Walt Disney's term for a "visual magnet")
5. Communicate with visual literacy (use a dominant color or shape or building to reinforce a theme)
6. Avoid overload—create turn-ons (do not offer too much detailed information)
7. Tell one story at a time (put one 'big idea' in each show so guests leave with a clear understanding of the theme)
8. Avoid contradictions—maintain identity (avoid irrelevant or contradicting elements; make sure the audience has a clear idea of what is being said)
9. For every ounce of treatment, provide a ton of treat (take advantage of the distinction of the theme park, which is that it encourages active participation, compared to passive entertainment)
10. Keep it up (do not become complacent or allow things to run down)

== Innovation ==
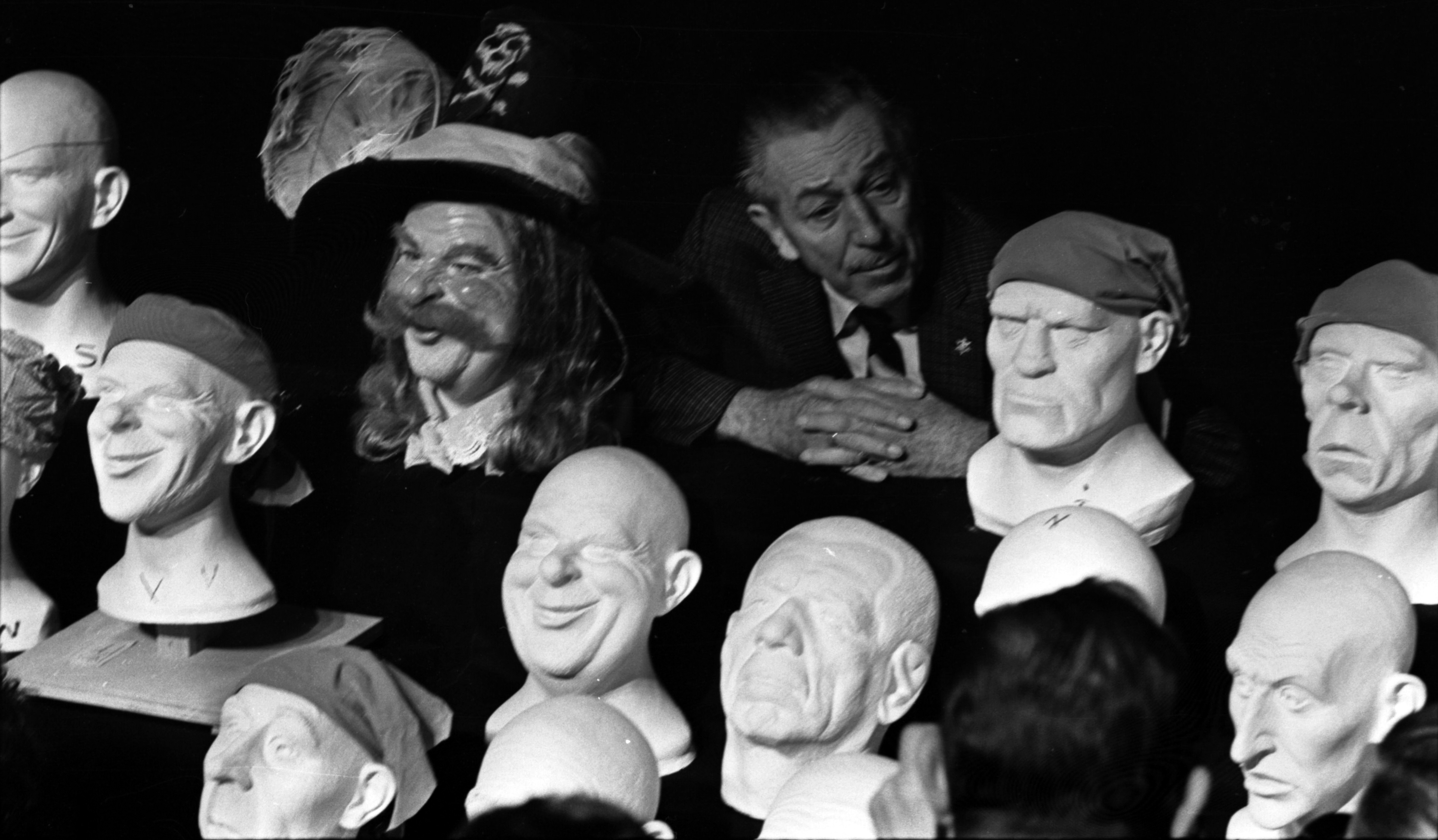
Walt Disney in 1966, inspecting plastic heads for use in the Disneyland iteration of Pirates of the Caribbean

Imagineering has been granted over 300 patents in areas such as advanced audio systems, fiber optics, interactive technology, live entertainment, ride systems and special effects. Imagineering pioneered technological advances such as the Circle-Vision 360° film technique and the FastPass virtual queuing system.

=== Audio-Animatronics ===
Imagineering is known for its development of Audio-Animatronics, a form of robotics, used in shows and theme park attractions that animate objects in three dimension (3D). The idea originated from Walt Disney's fascination with a mechanical bird that he purchased in New Orleans, which later led to the development of the attraction, The Enchanted Tiki Room. The attraction, which featured singing Audio-Animatronic birds, was the first to use this technology. In the 1964 World's Fair, a 3D figure of Abraham Lincoln was represented. The animated Lincoln delivered part of the Gettysburg Address for the "Great Moments with Mr. Lincoln" exhibit, the first human Audio-Animatronic figure.

Today, Audio-Animatronics are featured in many attractions, including Pirates of the Caribbean, The Haunted Mansion, The Hall of Presidents, Country Bear Musical Jamboree, Star Wars: Rise of the Resistance, and Tiana's Bayou Adventure. Some Audio-Animatronics figures can interact with park guests, such as Mr. Potato Head at Toy Story Mania!.

=== WEDway ===
WEDway is a people mover system using linear induction motor (LIM) technology to propel vehicles along a pair of steel rails. This system was developed in the company's early years. The system is in operation at Walt Disney World Resort's Magic Kingdom and George Bush Intercontinental Airport in Houston, Texas, United States. From 1967 to 1995, Disneyland utilized a version of this system which had rubber wheels placed every 9 feet along the guide-way.

== Projects developed by Imagineering ==
Since 1952, Imagineering has created twelve theme parks in six resort destinations, a town, eight cruise ships, dozens of resort hotels, water parks, shopping centers, sports complexes and various entertainment venues.

=== Current Imagineering projects ===
Project	Park/Resort	Opening Date
Shanghai Disney Enchanted Star Hotel	Shanghai Disney Resort	December 16, 2026
Sugar Rush: Sweet Rescue	Tokyo Disneyland	April 15, 2027
Disney's Lakeshore Lodge	Walt Disney World	July 1, 2027
Tropical Americas	Disney's Animal Kingdom	2027
Wilderness Explorers Sky Swings	Disney Adventure World	2027
Ultimate Pixar Adventure	Hong Kong Disneyland	2027
Space Mountain: Earthrise	Tokyo Disneyland	2027
Monstropolis	Disney's Hollywood Studios	2027
Bring the Rhythm!	Tokyo DisneySea	Fall 2027
Disney Believe	Disney Cruise Line	December 18, 2027
Avengers Infinity Defense	Disney California Adventure	2028
Stark Flight Lab	Disney California Adventure	2028
Asteria	Storyliving by Disney	Fall 2028
Disney Imagination	Disney Cruise Line	2029
Avengers Attraction	Hong Kong Disneyland	TBA
Lion King Area	Disney Adventure World	TBA
Spider-Man Area	Shanghai Disneyland	TBA
Coco Attraction	Disney California Adventure	TBA
Avatar Area	Disney California Adventure	TBA
Villains Land	Magic Kingdom	TBA
Piston Peak National Park	Magic Kingdom	TBA
Disneyland Abu Dhabi	Abu Dhabi, United Arab Emirates	TBA

== Other projects ==
Former creative director John Hench designed the "Tower of Nations" for the opening and closing ceremony of the 1960 Winter Olympics, whilst Walt Disney served as Pageantry Committee chairman.

Imagineering has collaborated with Disney Consumer Products on a number of projects for Disney Stores. The first store, in Glendale, was designed and constructed by a group of architectural Imagineers. Imagineering developed the now-defunct Walt Disney Gallery at the Main Place Mall in Santa Ana, California, and a Roman themed Disney Store at The Forum Shops at Caesars in Las Vegas. After the purchase of the Disney Stores by The Children's Place in 2004, Imagineering helped design an exclusive chain of flagship stores, called World of Disney. These are located in resorts, Lake Buena Vista, Florida and Anaheim, California, as well as New York City. Another flagship store arrived at Disneyland Paris in 2012. An overhaul of Disney Stores was planned in 2009 with the help of Apple CEO Steve Jobs. Disney hoped to transition from a traditional retail model to an interactive entertainment hub.

In the 1990s, Imagineering designed the 24,000 square feet (2,200 m^{2}) Club Disney interactive family fun center in Thousand Oaks, California. Although now closed, it was the first of several location-based entertainment (LBE) venues. In 1998, DisneyQuest, an 80,000 square feet (7,400 m^{2}) high-tech, virtual reality arcade was launched at Disney Springs in Lake Buena Vista, Florida. Another DisneyQuest in Chicago was launched a year later. In 2007, Imagineering oversaw design and construction of ships, Disney Dream and Disney Fantasy. They also helped design exhibitions for the Autry Museum of Western Heritage in Los Angeles and developed the Encounter Restaurant, which is located at the top of Theme Building in Los Angeles International Airport. Moreover, they provided exhibits for the Port Discovery children's museum at the Inner Harbor in Baltimore, Maryland, as well as the "Below Deck" sound show depicting Blackbeard's final battle as part of the Pirate and Treasure Museum in St. Augustine, Florida.

From 1995 to 1997, Imagineering oversaw the renovation of the New Amsterdam Theatre in New York City. Imagineering also remodeled the Times Square Studios in New York City in 1996, following the acquisition of ABC. In 1997, Disney purchased the California Angels and renamed the team to Anaheim Angels. Shortly after, Imagineering renovated the Anaheim Stadium. Imagineering worked with a charity, For Inspiration and Recognition of Science and Technology, to create the teaser video and the story, as well as the theming of the 2016 FIRST Robotics Competition, FIRST Stronghold.

== Corporate locations ==
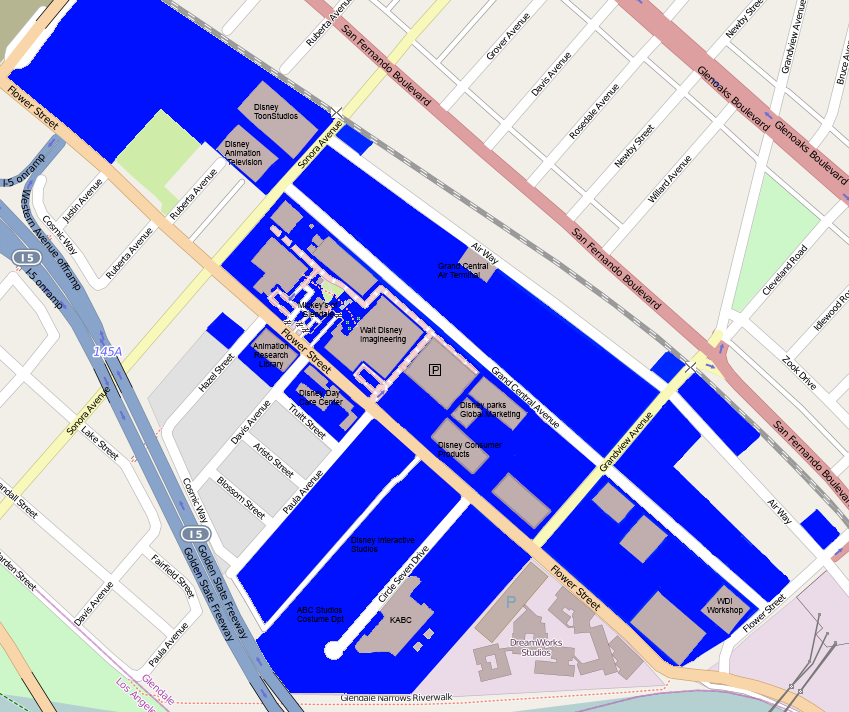
Map of Grand Central Creative Campus in Glendale, California

Since the 1960s, Imagineering's headquarters have been located in nondescript office buildings on the site of the former Grand Central Airport in Glendale, California, about two miles (3.2 km) east of Disney's corporate headquarters in Burbank. Many of these employees were set to be relocated to a new facility in Lake Nona, Orlando, Florida, however the move was canceled in May 2023 amid employee objections and disputes with Florida's state government. There are field offices at Epcot and Disney's Hollywood Studios at the Walt Disney World Resort. There are also offices located at:

- Walt Disney Imagineering Disneyland Field Office, Disneyland Resort
- Tokyo Disney Resort Administration Building, Tokyo Disney Resort
- Walt Disney Imagineering Hong Kong Site Office, Hong Kong Disneyland Resort
- Walt Disney Imagineering Germany GmbH, Meyer Werft Papenburg, Germany

== Bibliography ==
- Hench, John, with Peggy Van Pelt. Designing Disney: Imagineering and the Art of the Show. Disney Editions, 2003, ISBN 0-7868-5406-5.
- The Imagineers. Walt Disney Imagineering: A Behind the Dreams Look At Making the Magic Real. Disney Editions, 1996, ISBN 0-7868-6246-7 (hardcover); 1998, ISBN 0-7868-8372-3 (paperback).
- The Imagineers. Walt Disney Imagineering: A Behind the Dreams Look at Making More Magic Real. Disney Editions, 2010, ISBN 1-4231-0766-7 (hardcover).
- The Imagineers. The Imagineering Way: Ideas to Ignite Your Creativity. Disney Editions, 2003, ISBN 0-7868-5401-4.
- The Imagineers (as "The Disney Imagineers"). The Imagineering Workout: Exercises to Shape Your Creative Muscles. Disney Editions, 2005, ISBN 0-7868-5554-1.
- The Imagineers. The Imagineering Field Guide to Disneyland. Disney Editions, 2008, ISBN 1-4231-0975-9, ISBN 978-1-4231-0975-4.
- The Imagineers. The Imagineering Field Guide to Animal Kingdom at Walt Disney World. Disney Editions, 2007, ISBN 1-4231-0320-3, ISBN 978-1-4231-0320-2.
- The Imagineers. The Imagineering Field Guide to Epcot at Walt Disney World. Disney Editions, 2006, ISBN 0-7868-4886-3.
- The Imagineers. The Imagineering Field Guide to Magic Kingdom at Walt Disney World. Disney Editions, 2005, ISBN 0-7868-5553-3.
- Kurtti, Jeff. Walt Disney's Legends of Imagineering and the Genesis of the Disney Theme Park. Disney Editions, 2006, ISBN 0-7868-5559-2.
- Alcorn, Steve and David Green. Building a Better Mouse: The Story of the Electronic Imagineers Who Designed Epcot. Themeperks Press, 2007, ISBN 0-9729777-3-2.
- Surrell, Jason. The Disney Mountains: Imagineering at Its Peak. Disney Editions, 2007, ISBN 1-4231-0155-3
- Ghez, Didier; Littaye, Alain; Translated into English by Cohn, Danielle. Disneyland Paris From Sketch To Reality. Nouveau Millénaire Editions, 2002, ISBN 2-9517883-1-2
- Surrell, Jason. Pirates of the Caribbean: From The Magic Kingdom To The Movies. Disney Editions, 2007, ISBN 1-4176-9274-X, ISBN 978-1-4176-9274-3.
- Surrell, Jason. The Haunted Mansion: From The Magic Kingdom To The Movies. Disney Editions, 2003, ISBN 978-0-7868-5419-6

== See also ==
- List of Disney Imagineers
- List of female Disney Imagineers
- Disney Live Entertainment
- Disney Consumer Products and Interactive Media
- Disneyland
- Disney Research
- The Imagineering Story
- The Muppets Studio
- Retlaw Enterprises
- Walt Disney Animation Studios
- Pixar
- Marvel Studios
- Lucasfilm
- 20th Century Studios
- ESPN
- National Geographic
