= Disney Store =

Company selling Disney products

Disney Store Worldwide

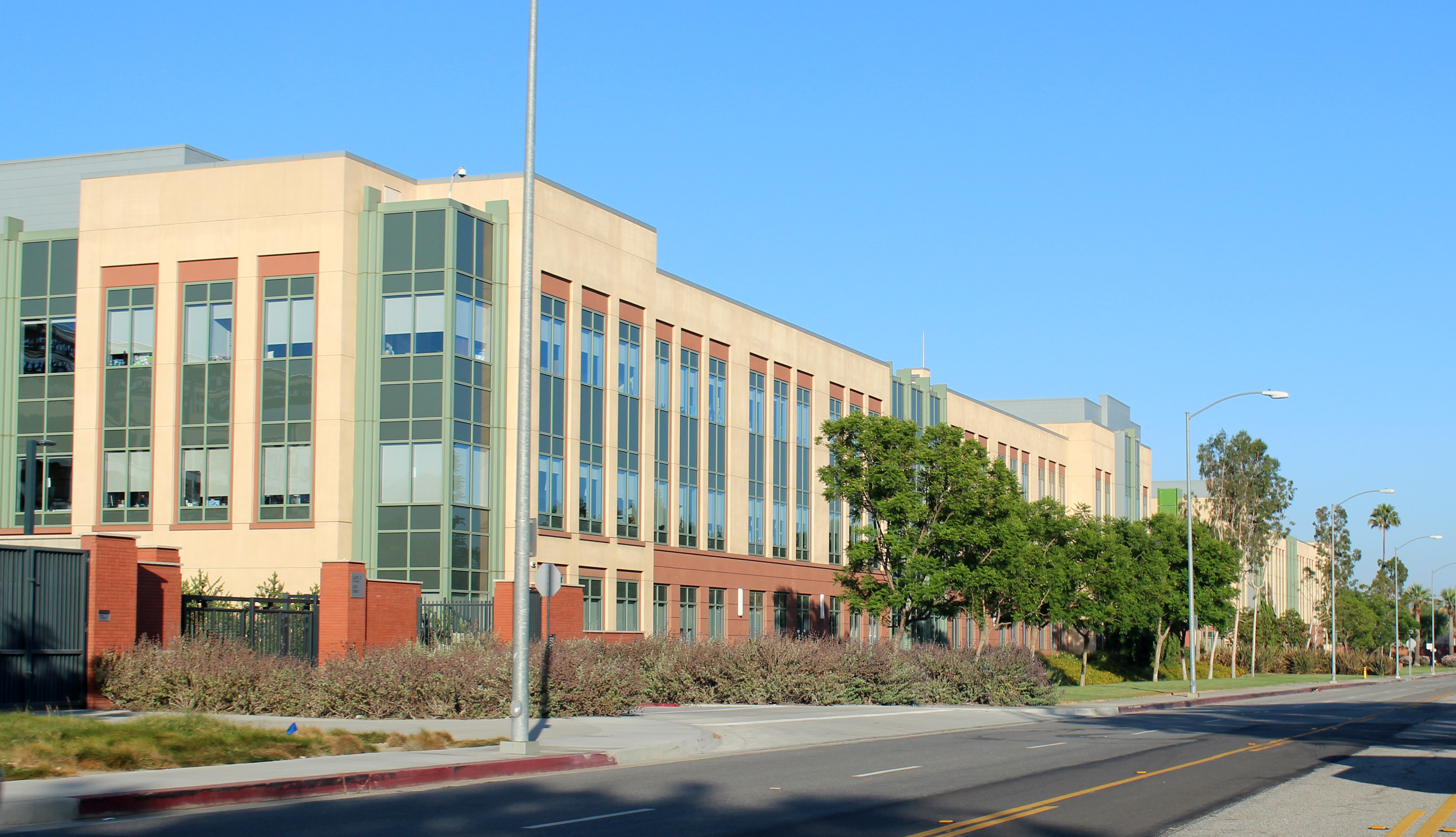
- The Disney Store headquarters in Glendale
- Type: Subsidiary
- Industry: Retail
- Founded: March 28, 1987; 39 years ago Glendale, California
- Headquarters: Grand Central Creative Campus, Glendale, California, U.S.
- Number of locations: 21 (Stand Alone)
- Area served: North America, Europe, Japan, China, Philippines
- Parent: Disney Experiences
- Website: DisneyStore.com

The Disney Store is a chain of specialty stores created on March 28, 1987, and sells only Disney-related items, many of them exclusive, under its own name and Disney Outlet. It is a business unit of the Disney Experiences division of The Walt Disney Company.

Disney Store was the first "retail-tainment", or entertainment store. The company had operated a number of store chains beyond its flagship Disney Store chain such as ESPN-The Store and the short-lived Mickey's Kitchen restaurant. Currently, the company operates the stand-alone stores, Walt Disney Gallery, and Disney's Studio Store / Soda Fountain. Disney Store was a partner for Disney at Harrods, which included a Bibbidi Bobbidi Boutique salon.

North America stores were owned and operated by The Children's Place's subsidiary Hoop Holdings from 2004 to 2008. The Oriental Land Company's subsidiary Retail Networks Co., Ltd. owned and operated the Japanese stores from 2002 to 2010. Since 2012, Disney departments exist in JCPenney in about 520 JCPenney locations. In India, two licensed chains, Disney Jeans and Disney Artist, are owned and operated by Indus Clothing and Ravi Jaipuria Corporation respectively. At the 2019 D23 Expo, it was announced that Disney departments were opening at Target stores across the United States starting in October prior to the release of Frozen 2. Disney Store items are also being sold on Target.com in addition to the Disney Store website (previously known as "shopDisney" from 2017 to 2024).

Disney's Character Warehouse Outlet Store was licensed out to liquidator Asset Management & Sales LLC to sell overstock and discontinued Disney Parks merchandise. The Character Warehouses only have two permanent locations in the International and Vineland Outlets in Orlando. Asset Management & Sales is owned by Janie and Gary Stump.

== History ==
The first Disney Store opened in the Glendale Galleria in Glendale, California, on March 28, 1987. (Note: "1987". source: *Prince of the Magic Kingdom, by Joe Flower, 1991. *Work in Progress, by Michael Eisner, 1998. Page 243.)

The first Disney Store outside California opened in Bridgewater Commons in Bridgewater, New Jersey, on June 18, 1988.

The first overseas Disney Store opened in November 1990 in London, England. (Note: "1987". source: *Work in Progress, by Michael Eisner, 1998. Page 246. *The New Internationalist, December 1998, Number 308. Page 19.)

Logo used from 2010 to 2017

Doug Murphy was hired by Disney Store as manager of new business development in September 1991, then promoted to head business development in April 1993. The first Japanese location opened in 1992 as did the first Australian store. In 1992, Disney Dollars were available at Disney Stores. (Note: "1992". source: Disney Magazine, Summer 1997. Page 68.)

A showcase 11,000 square feet (1,000 m^{2}) location was opened in the third quarter 1994 at the Post and Powell corner of San Francisco's Union Square. On October 24, 1994, its Disney Store (Hong Kong) Ltd. opened its first location in a New Territories shopping center. In 1996, Disney Store opened its flagship location in New York City. A Disney Store location opened next to the El Capitan Theatre in its building in 1998.

The first Walt Disney Gallery opened outside of the park next to the Disney Store at Main Place Santa Ana in California on November 4, 1994 and was operated by Disney Store. Doug Murphy was appointed vice president of the Walt Disney Gallery for Disney Store in December 1994.

Store Numbers
Year	Licensed	Disney Owned
1987	N/A	1
1990	N/A	78
1992	N/A	126
1993	N/A	215
1994	N/A	310
1997	N/A	749
2001	N/A	700
2004	313	
2008	322 (March 24)	220
2009	357	
2013	520	200
2014	564	200
2015	680	

In 2000, its store in Munich was closed. In September 2000, Disney Store remodeled two stores, showing off prototype designs in Costa Mesa and Cherry Hill, N.J. These stores had more space and a high-tech look where theme park tickets could be bought via computer stations. When Disney indicated that this new model would be rolled out to 350 stores, they also indicated the closure of 100 locations worldwide. Analysts had indicated that Disney had overbuilt stores. By April 2001, 20 stores were redone in the high tech style when a new president, Peter Whitford, was hired.

In late 2002, two new prototypes were rolled out in Canoga Park and Torrance. In March 2002, Disney Stores Worldwide announced that the chain would be split into two types of stores, Disney Play and Disney Kids at Home. They also continued closing stores to reach 350 by 2005. The Disney Play stores would stock Disney character toys, plush dolls and costumes aimed at young children, while Disney Kids at Home targeted parents looking to purchase home furnishings, clothing and bed & bath products for their children. Some were expected to be a hybrid of both concepts. This roll out of the two store brands was expected to take 3 years. On March 31, 2003, its 16 Australian locations closed.

With lackluster films, high-priced and high-margin items, sales dropped while continuing to overly open stores. The company closed hundreds of stores in order to make a slim profit. Whitford left in 2003.

=== Licensed out North American and Japanese operations ===
Even though the Disney Stores maintained strong sales, mounting costs of sales and operation, and the loss of key executives who had driven the Disney Stores to success led The Walt Disney Company to convert the Disney Stores into a licensed operation. The Japanese stores were sold to The Oriental Land Company in 2002, while most North American stores were sold and licensed in November 2004 to The Children's Place.

The Walt Disney Company decided to keep the stores in Europe, along with the flagship store in Manhattan, which was converted into a World of Disney store run by Walt Disney Parks and Resorts in 2004, while The Children's Place got the Chicago flagship location. On June 2, 2005, the Disney's Soda Fountain and Studio Store opened up in the El Capitan Building on the ground floor replacing a Disney Store.

Disney sold the chain for the cost of inventory to the Children's Place's subsidiary Hoop Holdings and signed a 15-year licensing agreement. Under the licensing agreement, a "royalty holiday" period existed until October 2006 to allow revamping of the stores. The royalty thereafter was 5% of store sales while online sales give Disney a 9% to 10% royalty. Hoop Holdings had to write off the cost ($48 million) of the equipment and property received in the purchase. On the weekend of March 24, 2005, Hoop Holdings opened its first Disney Store Outlet location.

The Children's Place intended to reinvigorate the Disney Store brand in the United States by expanding the number of stores, reducing initial selling prices. Previously, Disney Stores have been well known for inflated initial prices, which would be marked down substantially after just a few weeks. Also, The Children's Place opened Disney outlet stores, which have lower operating costs and typically have a high profit margin even though they have reduced prices versus mall stores. However, Disney's strict licensing agreement, which included the burden of being required to invest significantly in store remodels, contributed to the eventual decision by The Children's Place to exit the business.

Hoops saw progress with its strategy as open stores in 2006 for 11 month saw 15% increase in sales assisted by a better Disney box office results, and the success of the Disney Channel's hit made-for-TV movie High School Musical. A store website would be up and running in April 2007. Hoops Retail Stores, DBA Disney Store and a subsidiary of The Children's Place, commenced a 13-year lease of the Royal Laundry Complex in 2006.

On June 8, 2007, Disney Consumer Products and The Children's Place settled a licensing agreement dispute, in which Disney indicated 130 unfixed breaches. The Children's Place agreed to have a new prototype store design approved by Disney by the end of June with the prototype to rolled out to 234 existing stores by January 31, 2012, while 18 new prototype store would be opened by early 2009. At the Chicago flagship and about 165 other locations, Hoops would get maintenance up to date by June 30, 2008. Restrictions on Disney to give direct merchandising licenses to other specialty retailers was loosened.

In 2005, DCP has begun working with various Indian retail outlets to establish Disney Corners within the outlets to sell licensed merchandise. On 26 September 2006, the Disney Jeans brand was launched under license to Indus Clothing, who planned to open 30 Disney Jean stores by the end of 2007. In October 2006, DCP licensed the rights to Ravi Jaipuria Corporation for five years to set up 150 Disney Artist brand stores and wholesales under the Disney Artist brand, which sold Disney character-branded greeting cards, stationery, arts, crafts and party products in India, Nepal, Sri Lanka, Bangladesh and Maldives.

=== Reunited operations ===
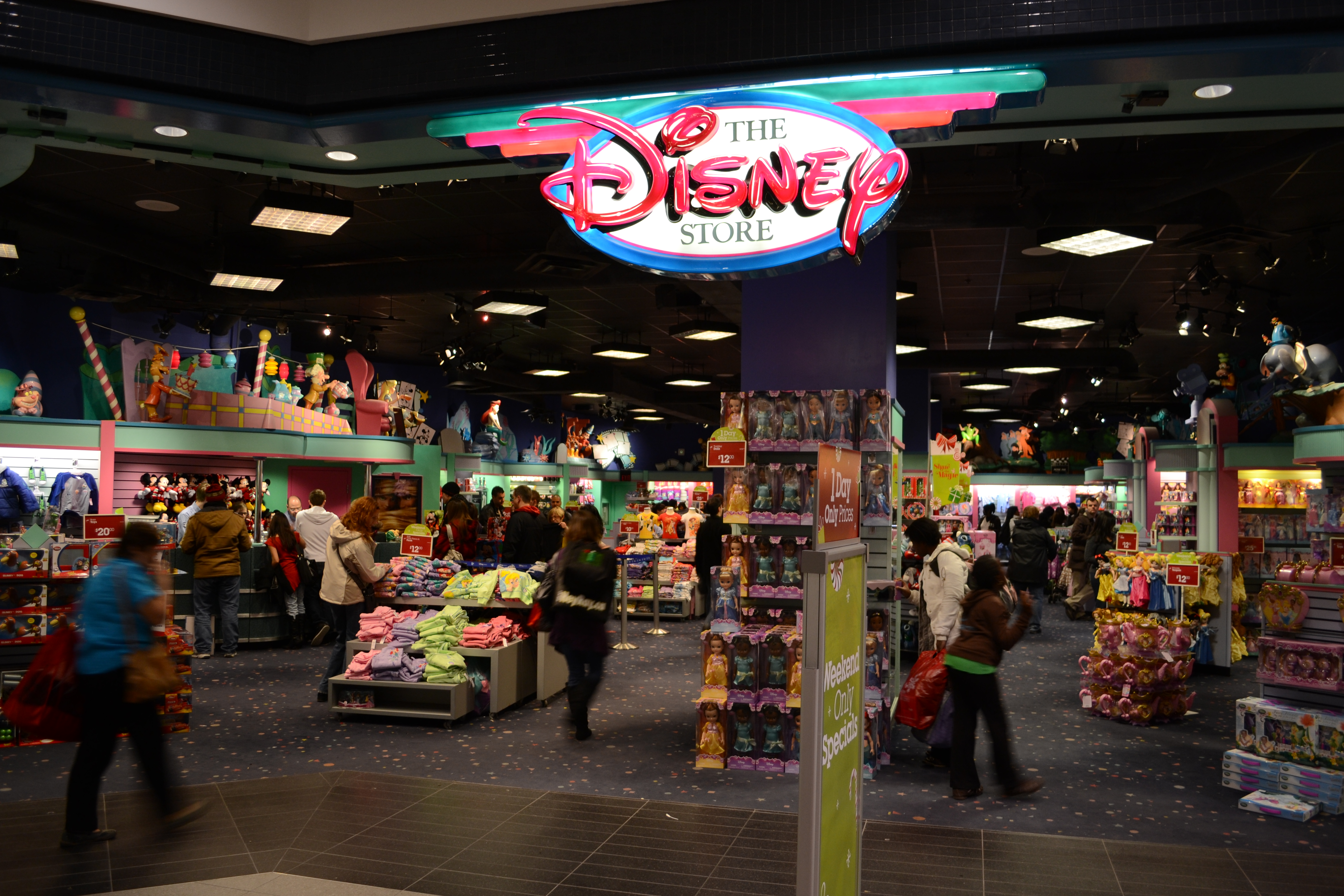
The old Disney Store in Toronto Eaton Centre in Toronto, Ontario, Canada in 2010, before renovations.

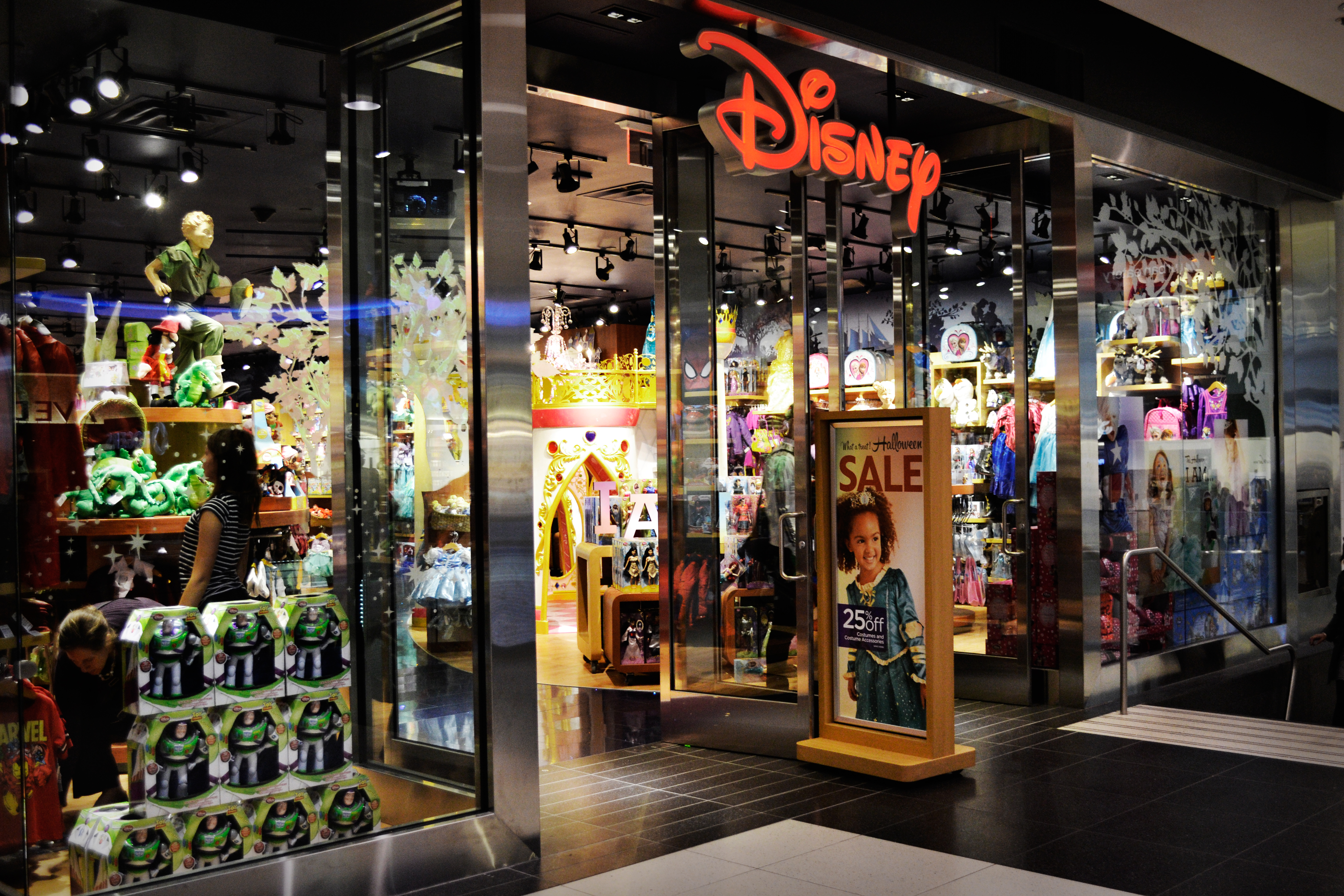
The former Disney Store in Toronto Eaton Centre in 2014 after renovations. The location closed on September 22nd, 2021.

Hoop Retail, The Children's Place subsidiary operating the Disney Stores, announced on March 20, 2008, that they were in talks to sell the Disney Store brand back to The Walt Disney Company. Hoop Retail filed for Chapter 11 bankruptcy in March. On May 1, 2008, 231 Disney Stores in North America once again became the property of Disney, operating under the Disney Consumer Products arm. James Fielding was named president of Disney Stores Worldwide. In Europe at the time, the chain had 107 locations. The San Francisco showcase location was closed in 2008.

Furthermore, Disney announced in November 2009 that they were planning a massive "re-launching" and re-branding of all Disney Store locations, spearheaded by Apple's Steve Jobs, who pioneered the Apple Retail Store concept. The new store look and feel was designed by New York-based design firm Pompei A.D. and was referred to as 'Imagination Parks', which was under consideration as a new name for the stores. This model was to be high tech and have several interactive activities. $1 million was the expected outlay for converting to this concept. The first of these stores were opened in May 2010 in Long Island, Madrid and Southern California. 40 more of this format were to open in 2011.

With the shuttering of the Disney Parks and Resorts-run World of Disney store in Fifth Avenue New York City in January 2010, a Disney Store replaced it on Broadway and became the flagship store. It opened late in the year capping off a 20-store opening.

The Oriental Land Company announced that it would sell its Japanese Disney Stores back to The Walt Disney Company. Disney took over Retail Networks Co., Ltd., an Oriental Land Company subsidiary owning the Disney Stores in Japan, beginning on March 31, 2010. Ireland's first store opened on May 18, 2011.

With president Fielding leaving, he was replaced by Molly Adams and Paul Gainer as executive vice presidents in charge of the global retail operation from their Disney Store senior vice president positions in May 2012. On September 6, 2012, the first flagship Disney Baby Store opened in Glendale, California. Regular stores were expected to add a Disney Baby section. In November 2013, Disney's Soda Fountain and Studio Store replaced DeWar with Ghirardelli Chocolate Company operating the soda fountain half of the shop.

In January 2012, Disney Stores indicated that the company would open 25 to 40 locations in China over the next three years, with the first store originally scheduled for the fourth quarter of 2012. On October 25, 2013, Disney announced that the first Disney Store in Shanghai, China would open in 2015. On May 20, 2015, this Chinese flagship Disney Store opened.

On September 21, 2012, Disney announced a partnership with JCPenney (JCP) to open a Disney department with 750 to 1,100 square feet (70 to 102 m^{2}) in about 520 Penney locations. JCP's online version opened on September 6 and the store within a store locations opened on October 4. With the success of these Disney shops and its exclusive merchandise in 2014, Penney added 44 additional stores and add 116 more in 2015 for a total of 620. The JCP locations were also promoting the Disney live action Cinderella film. This actually marked the second time Disney and JCP had team up on promoting a movie, while the first was with the animated movie.

A NY Attorney General inquiry into On-call scheduling in 2016 led Disney Stores to indicate in December that the retailer had dropped the practice early in the year. In the UK, Disney Stores Europe opened nine Pop-up shops in October 2016 for the Christmas season.

Disney Stores reopened in Germany on November 9, 2017, with a single store on Neuhauser Straße in Munich where Disney Germany is headquartered. The store was permanently closed in June 2020. As a promotion for its sleep shop launch in August 2018, Disney Store operated, during the month, a bedtime hotline where Mickey Mouse and friends share a short bedtime message. In mid-November 2018, the Disney Stores USA headquarters moved out of the Royal Laundry Complex in Pasadena to Grand Central Creative Campus, Glendale, California.

With the announced closing of the only store in West Virginia in the Huntington Mall on May 26, 2019, family rallied at the store in an organized "cash-mob" event to save the store. However, The Herald-Dispatch reported that the mall rent was not the issue, but that the chain was systematically closing its stores.

At the D23 Expo in August 2019, Disney announced that it would be partnering with Target to open 25 "shop-within-shops" inside of Targets on October 4.

=== Closure ===
In early March 2021, Disney announced that it would close at least 155 Disney Store locations in North America (United States and Canada) and focus more on its e-commerce operations. On May 5, 2021, Disney announced that it would close all the Disney Store locations in Europe (with the exception of a handful of stores such as the flagship store at Disney Village in Disneyland Paris). On June 18, it was announced that the original Glendale Galleria location would close on July 14, 2021 (among other 16 stores). On July 23, it was announced that most Canadian stores (with the exception of Toronto Eaton Centre, Vaughan Mills, and Scarborough Town Center) would be closing on or before August 18, 2021. The final 1990s "pink and green" location at Chicago Ridge Mall in Chicago Ridge, Illinois was also announced to be part of these closures. On August 23, it was announced that 59 stores would close on or before September 15, leaving only twenty-two stores remaining in the United States. It was also announced that the last three Canadian stores would close as well. On December 24, it was announced that the Disney Store located in Bellevue, Washington would close on January 19, 2022.

On April 12, 2025, it was announced that the flagship Disney Store at Disney Village in Disneyland Paris would permanently close in fall 2025, being replaced by a new store named Disney Wonders.

=== Lawsuit ===
In July 2021, UBS Realty sued Disney for back rent at The Shops at Montebello location in Montebello, California, in the amount of $275,000.

== Locations ==
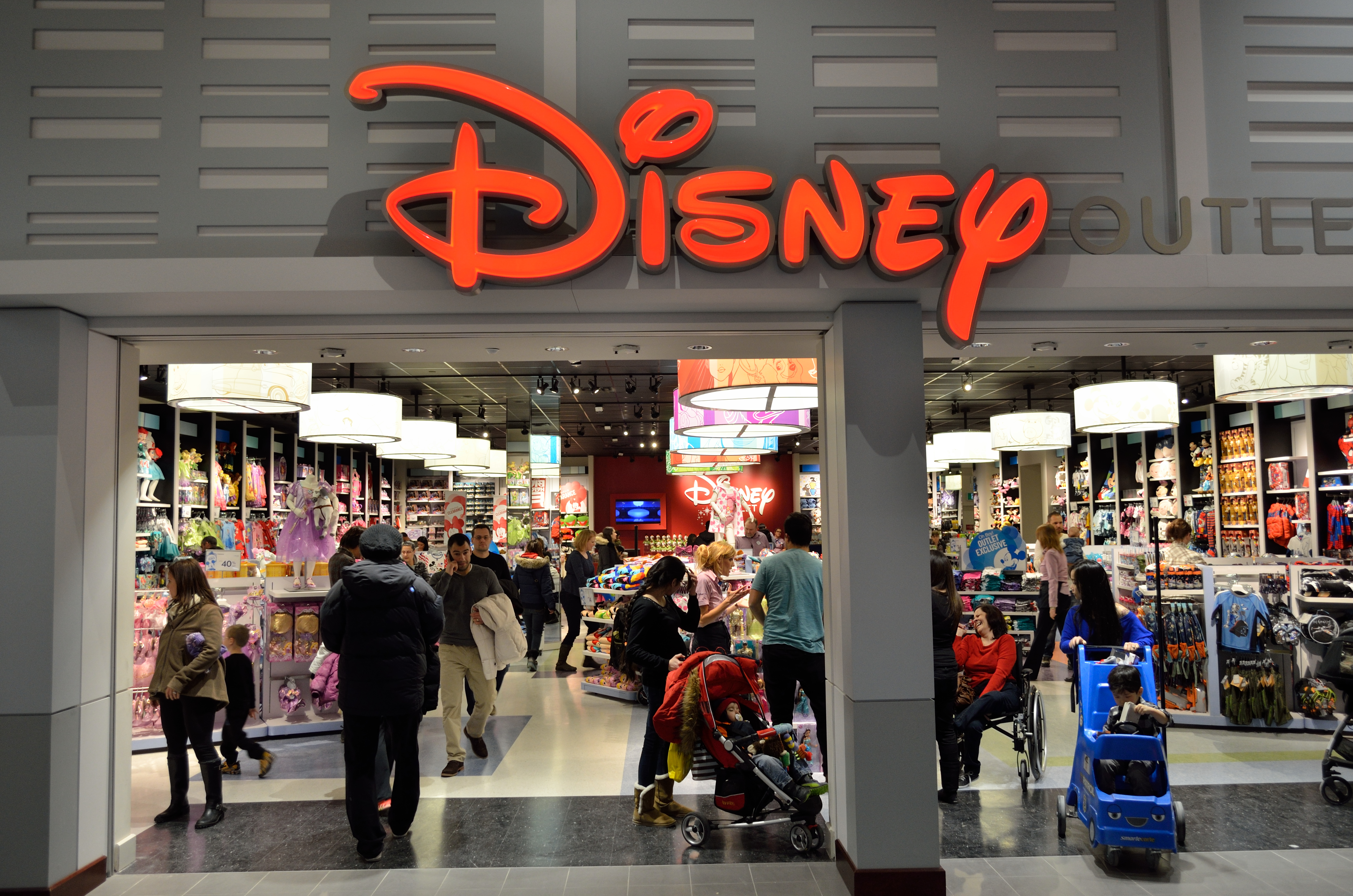
A former Disney Outlet in Vaughan Mills

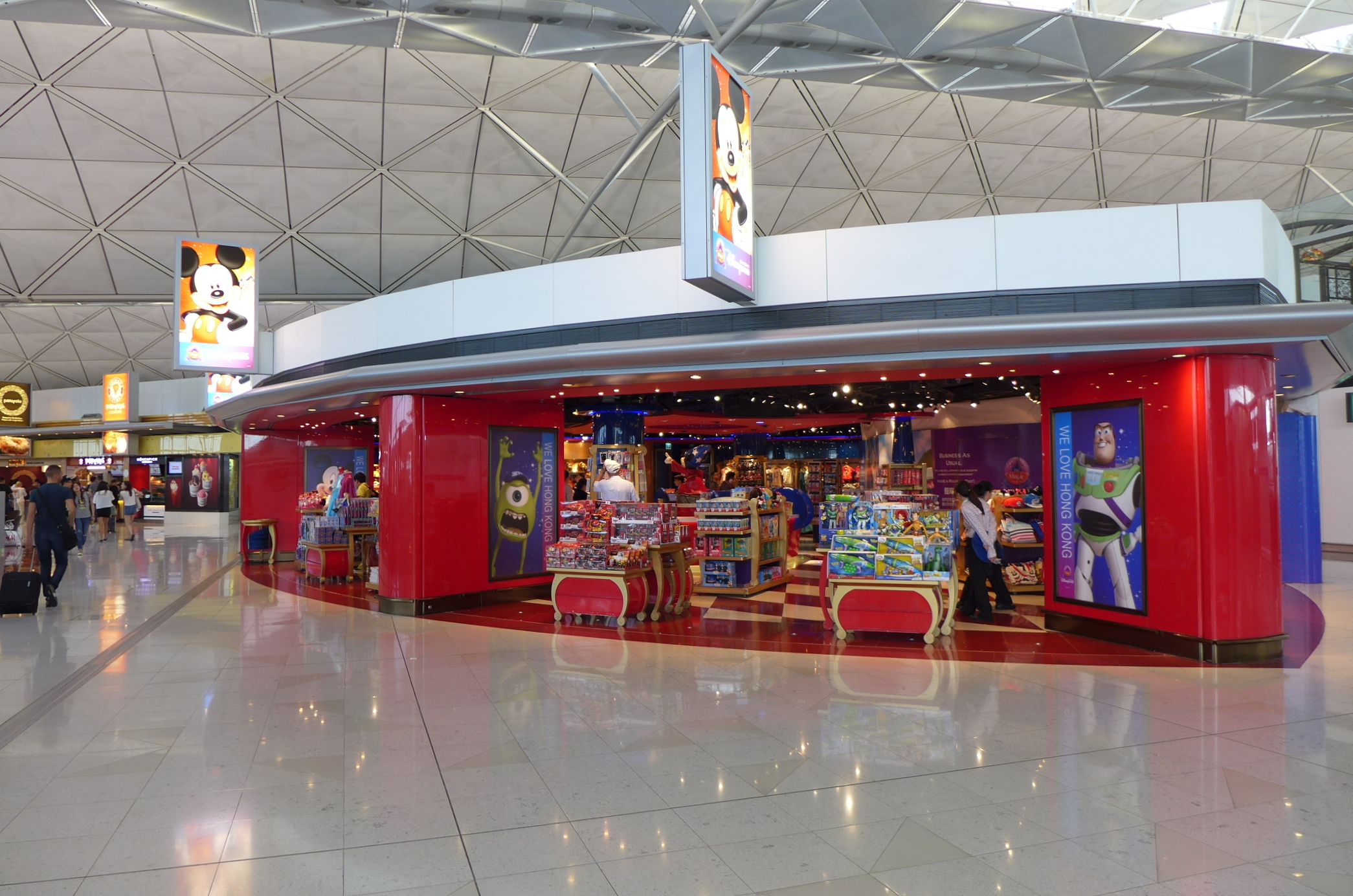
The Magic of Hong Kong Disneyland in Hong Kong International Airport

Countries
Country	Opened	locations (#)
United States	March 28, 1987	27 (21 stand alone, 2 World of Disney [Disney Springs, FL and Downtown Disney, CA], 2 Walt Disney World Stores [International Drive, FL and MCO Airport Terminal C], and 2 Magic of Disney Stores [MCO Airport Before East and West Security, Terminal A/B)
Japan	1992	40+
England	November 1990	4 (1 standalone [London], 2 Selfridges [Manchester and Birmingham])
France	1993	1 (World of Disney, Disney Village)
Ireland	2011	1 (Dublin)
China	2015	1 (Flagship, see below)
Hong Kong	October 24, 1994	1 (Hong Kong Airport)
Philippines	September 27, 2024; September 6, 2025	1; 2

Disney Stores are located in malls and commercial areas in the United States, Japan, the United Kingdom, France, Ireland, China, Hong Kong, and the Philippines. A small number of stores were opened in Hong Kong however, the Australian stores were closed in 2003, and the only Disney Store in Hong Kong at this time is located in the Hong Kong International Airport, which was renamed The Magic of Hong Kong Disneyland and managed by Hong Kong International Theme Parks. Disney also operated approximately 15 smaller-scale locations in airports throughout the United States, which were all shuttered in the early 2000s, with the last being the Ronald Reagan Washington National Airport location in summer 2004. Disney Store came back to Germany with a flagship store in Munich in November 2017. This store has since closed.

In the United States and Europe, Disney Stores are owned by The Walt Disney Company. However, Japanese Disney Stores were owned and operated by The Oriental Land Company, the company that owns and operates the Tokyo Disney Resort, but have now been bought back by The Walt Disney Company. From November 21, 2004, until May 1, 2008, Disney Stores in the United States and Canada were owned and operated by Hoop Retail Stores, a wholly owned subsidiary of The Children's Place, LLC. Oriental Land operates Disney Stores under a long-term license agreement with The Walt Disney Company, as did The Children's Place. In the United Kingdom and Europe, Disney operates approximately 30 locations. As of early 2021, Disney maintained about 300 Disney Stores worldwide. After mass closures in 2021, the company is down to operating only 21 stand alone stores in the United States plus 6 special stores in and near their theme parks in Florida and California.

=== Features ===
In 2010, Disney started rolling out a themed retail business model and redesign led by Steve Jobs for its stores dubbed Imagination Parks. At the overhauled stores, shopping is more interactive with a large castle that has a mirror in which Disney princesses appear, and projectors have the leaves in the trees changing to Disney characters. The store's perimeter is a lined skyline with local landmarks and added Disney themes for the appearance, and the store is the center of "this big, magical world." Inside there is a pixie dust trail leading throughout the store. Many revamped stores get localized products and design touches. For example, Las Vegas has 35 items including showgirl Minnie and Elvis costumed Stitch.

Also, a daily opening ceremony takes place with music. A Cast Member selects a child to unlock the store by placing a giant key into a giant padlock. This triggers Tinker Bell flying about inside as the darkened store's interior gradually increases its lighting as projected pseudo fireworks are set off.

=== China flagship ===
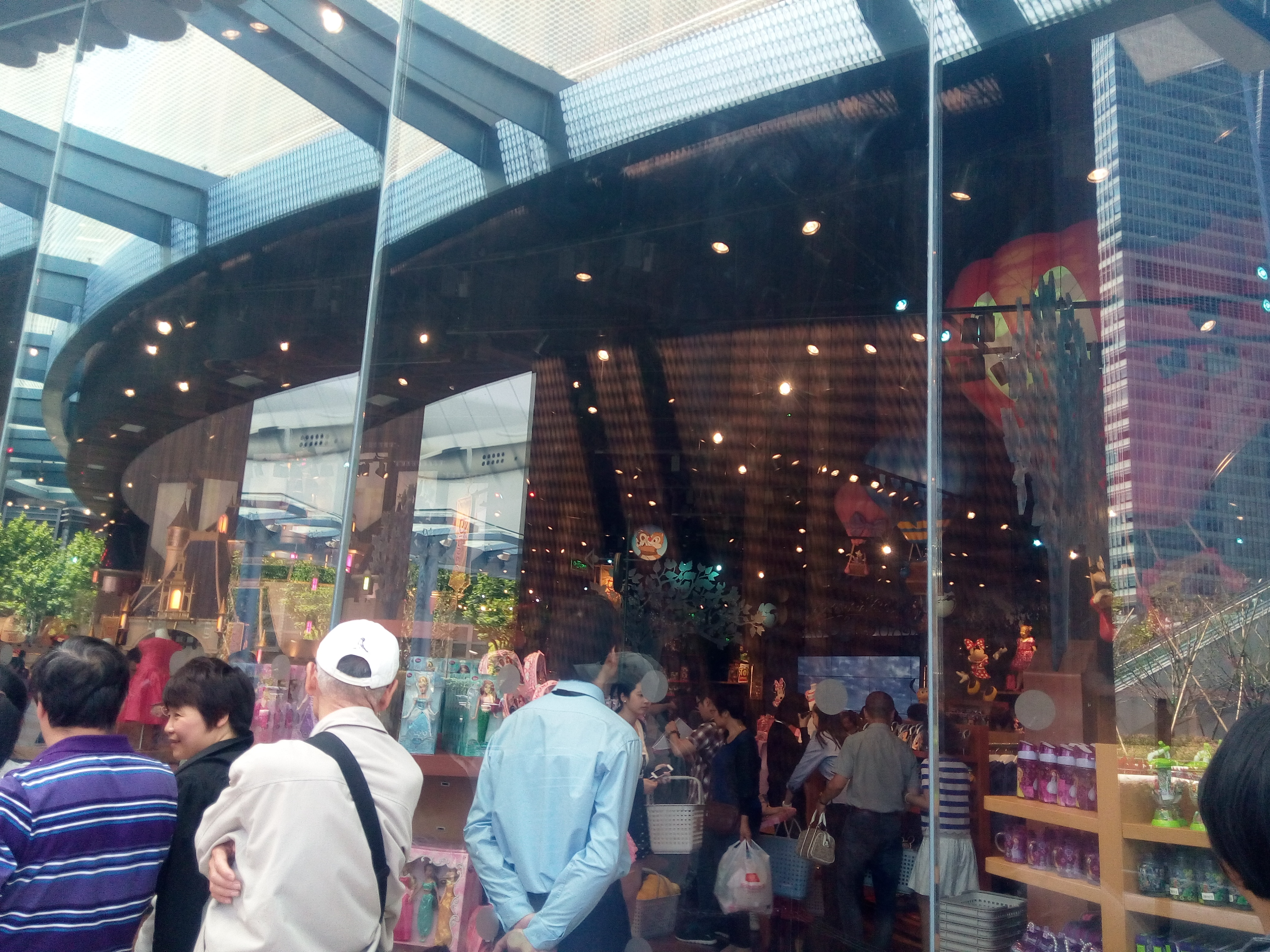
Disney China flagship Store in Lujiazui

The flagship Disney Store in China is in the Lujiazui area of Shanghai with 54,000 square feet (5,000 m^{2}). This is the largest Disney Store in the world. A 19 feet (5.8 m) high Magic Kingdom castle is in the middle of the store and has a projected musical show that is shown on the hour. Also, the location has an outdoor plaza with a Mickey Mouse flowerbed. The location has a Marvel area with statues of Iron Man, Thor, an 8-foot-tall Hulk and other heroes. Mickey and Minnie Mouse, Goofy, Daisy and Donald Duck are in a hot-air balloons. Its roof is an illuminated Mickey Mouse shape.

The store opened on May 20, 2015, at 1:14pm. The specific date and time were chosen because of their significance in Chinese culture as a "time to openly express love and long-term commitment to each other".

=== Chicago flagship ===
A flagship Disney Store was built in Chicago on the Magnificent Mile at 717 N. Michigan Avenue with 7,000 square feet (650 m^{2}) at ground floor, twice a standard store's footprint, with Saks Fifth Avenue men's store taking the remainder of the ground floor plus the second and third floor. This flagship store replaced the original location at Water Tower Place, and joined two Disney Regional Entertainment chain locations, DisneyQuest and ESPN Zone nearby in the North Bridge development. The store opened on July 26, 1999, and an official dedication occurred on August 5, 1999, with Chicago native and DCP president Anne Osberg, along with a live special appearance from Mickey Mouse. An exclusive 13 1/2-inch "Blues Mickey" plush toy which had an "unprecedented one-store, one-day limited edition Mini Bean Bag Plush" was also available for the dedication. Children's Place got the Chicago flagship location when the company's subsidiary operated the chain. (2004–2008) A smaller store later opened on 108 North State Street in 2010, but then closed in March 2021. The Michigan Avenue store would also close on September 15, 2021.

=== New York City flagship ===
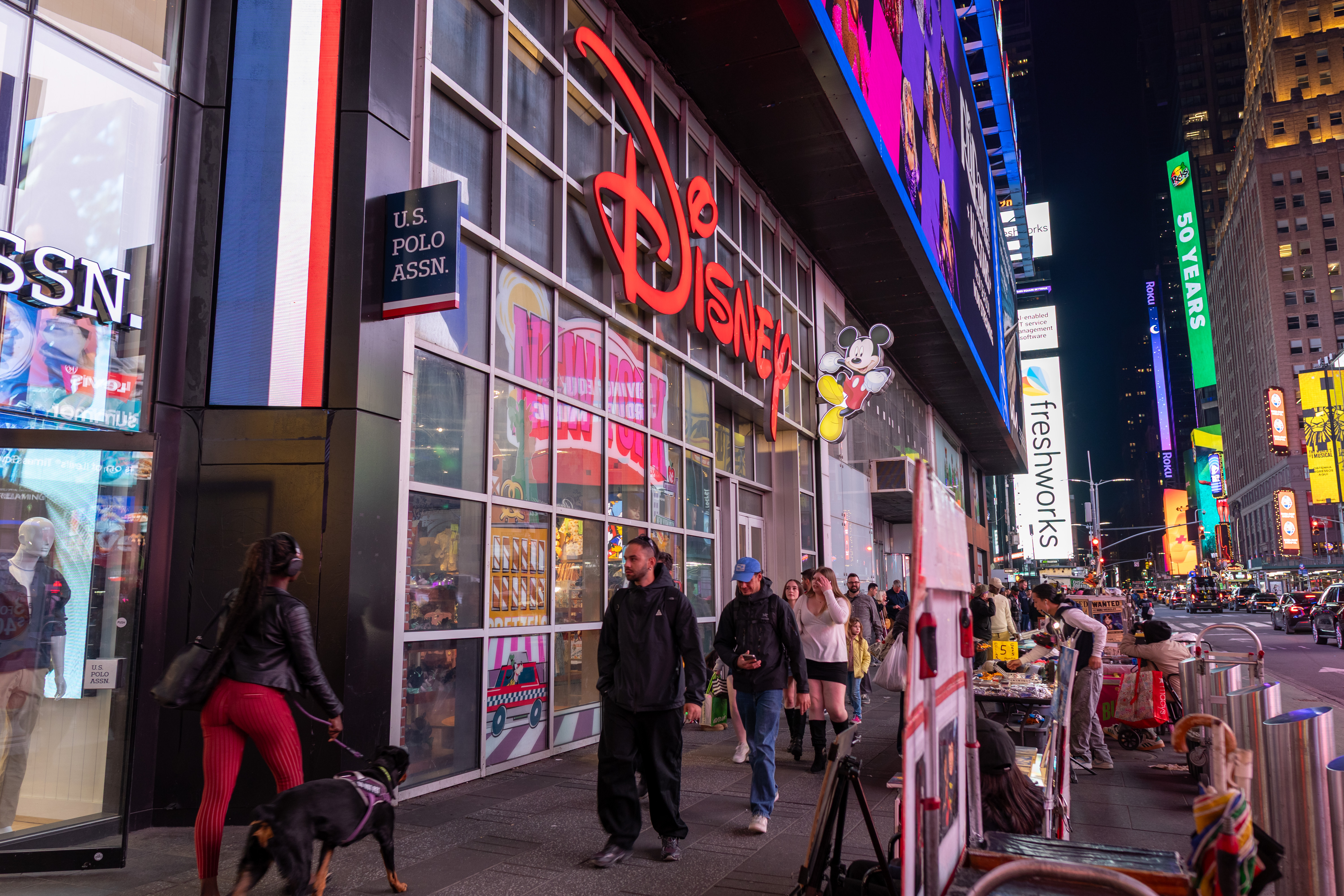
The Times Square store, pictured in May 2026.

On May 22, 1996, an original flagship Disney Store opened in New York City at a corner of 55th Street and Fifth Avenue in the former La Côte Basque restaurant location. With the sale of the US location, the store in Manhattan was kept and converted into a World of Disney store run by Disney Experiences in 2004. With the shuttering of the Disney Parks and Resorts-run World of Disney store in Fifth Avenue New York City in January 2010 due to high rent, the Disney Store was moved to 1540 Broadway in Times Square in the former Virgin Megastore and became the flagship store when it opened on November 9, 2010, capping off a 20 store opening year. Its localized design features include Macy's Thanksgiving Day Parade inspired oversized Mickey and Minnie balloons floating above and Broadway is recognized with Disney-themed playbills.

=== Philippines flagship as part of SM ===
Disney Store at SM Mall of Asia.

On September 27, 2024, Disney Store opened in SM Mall of Asia followed in North EDSA and Greenhills Shopping Center soon on SM Nuvali in Laguna and other SM Malls.

=== Baby Store ===
The Disney Baby Store in Americana at Brand, Glendale, California, is the only flagship store of its brand. The store is used as a testing grounds for Disney Baby line of products.

With a recent focus on baby products by Disney Consumer Products, Glendale was chosen as the location of a corresponding store given it was near to Disney Consumer Products and Disney Store headquarters. In early June 2011, Disney Consumer Products chairman Andy Mooney announced that Disney Stores would open two Disney Baby Stores, one on each coast while indicating Glendale had already been chosen. Disney Consumer Products had reached out to new mothers and new born through Our365 company by giving a Disney Cuddly Bodysuit as a part of the hospital sample goods. This is a part of a larger push across the Walt Disney Company as Disney Junior block launched a new series in 2011, while the 24-hour Disney Junior cable channel launched in 2012.

On September 6, 2012, the first flagship Disney Baby Store opened in Americana at Brand, Glendale, California with an Operation Shower military mom baby shower on a Wednesday and a Grand Opening on Saturday. Disney Consumer Products President Bob Chapek and Alison Sweeney and Winnie the Pooh and friends were there for the opening, plus musical act Blue Sky Riders. The first store manager was Kim Chapman. On July 23, 2021, it was announced the store would close permanently.

=== Studio Store ===
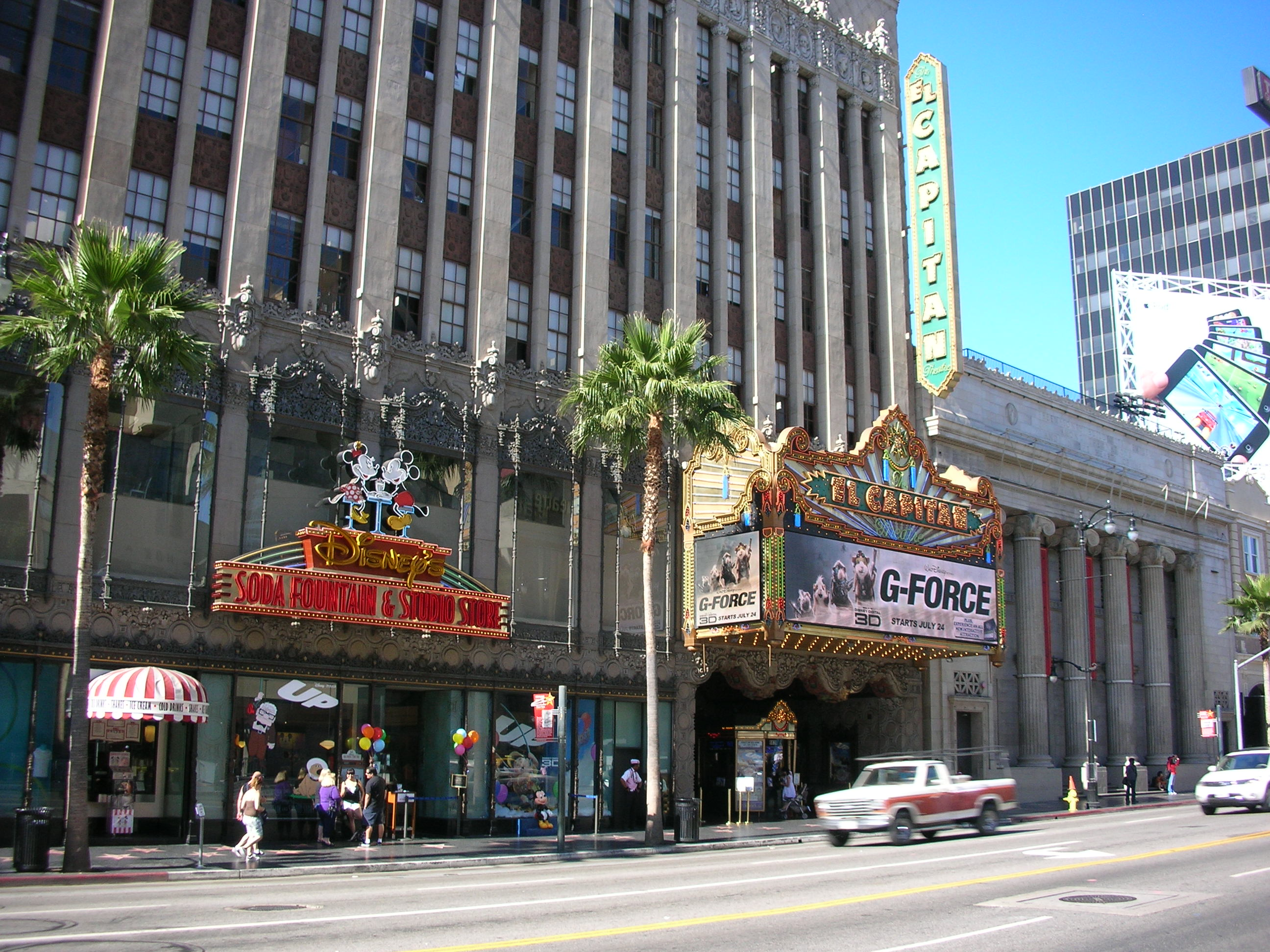
Disney's Soda Fountain and Studio Store in the El Capitan Theater building

Disney's Soda Fountain and Studio Store, also Disney Studio Store Hollywood, is a co-located store consisting of Disney Studio Store and Ghirardelli Soda Fountain in the El Capitan Theatre building.

A Disney Store location opened next to the El Capitan Theatre in its building in 1998. On June 2, 2005, Disney's Soda Fountain and Studio Store opened up in the El Capitan Building on the ground floor replacing a Disney Store. The store has a take-out counter, a street-front cone window, and in-store table service.

=== Character Warehouse Outlet Store ===
Disney's Character Warehouse Outlet Store was licensed out to liquidator Asset Management & Sales LLC to sell overstock and discontinued Disney Parks merchandise. The Character Warehouses just have a few permanent locations (Fullerton and Pomona, California, and Las Vegas) while having temporary stores at times. Asset Management & Sales was owned by Janie and Gary Stump. In early 2007, the company opened a year-round store in Midvale, Utah. This store was forced to temporarily move to Taylorville as the result of a squabble between the landlord and a neighboring business. The Midvale location never recovered its sales after returning thus shut its doors in May 2008. Asset Management, based near Murfreesboro, Tennessee, also owned Character Depot stores, both seasonal and year-round locations. They opened a permanent Character Depot in Murfreesboro in January 2012. Both outlet malls in Orlando, International and Vineland Outlets, still have Character Warehouse stores open.

=== JCPenney store-in-store ===
In 2013, Disney announced that it would be partnering with JCPenney department stores nationwide to open 525 "shop-within-shops" inside of JCPenney stores on October 4, 2013, in time for the release of Frozen.

=== Target store-in-store ===
At the D23 Expo in August 2019, Disney announced that it would be partnering with Target to open 25 "shop-within-shops" inside of Targets on October 4 in time for the releases of Frozen 2 and Star Wars: The Rise of Skywalker. The stores would be, on average 750 square feet (70 m^{2}) and include music, interactive displays, and Disney movie clips. They also have created subsite for these stores at Target's website. Target and Disney announced another 40 such locations would be opened by October 2020 and a new Target location near Disney World. Target and Disney announced they will open 100 more locations by December 25, 2021, as most Disney Stores close for good.

=== Disney at Harrods ===
Disney at Harrods was a partnership between Disney and Harrods for the operation of Disney stores, Bibbidi Bobbidi Boutique, a Disney Store and Disney Cafe, within Harrods from 2002 to 2017.

On October 10, 2012, a 7,000 square foot Disney popup shop with a Princess Parlour, Cinderella Slipper salon, special Disney/Pixar corner and Activity Zone was set up in Harrods on the fourth floor. Harrod followed National Princess Week with their Christmas theme being Disney Princesses by having Oscar de la Renta designed dresses for the Princesses. In August, the dresses were on display at D23 Expo before being auctioned off on November 13 to benefit Great Ormond Street Hospital Children's Charity.

Within the previously operating Disney Cafe and Disney Store, the Disney at Harrods partnership added the Bibbidi Bobbidi Boutique salon to those stores. The Bibbidi Bobbidi Boutique salon was replicated for the first time for any Disney Parks, Experiences and Products experience in Europe at Harrods as a part of Disney at Harrods with its opening on November 25, 2013.

From July to 21 August 2016, a Star Wars gallery ticketed event was held here with the Millennium Falcon cockpit, Holochess Table and Sofa and prop replicas. Propshop's state-of-the-art photogrammetry system captured heads and faces added to a Rebel Pilot, Stormtrooper or TIE Fighter Pilot overlay for personalized half a meter tall scale model for sale along with prop replicas. On June 1, 2017, Disney at Harrods closed.

== Mickey's Kitchen ==
Mickey's Kitchen was Disney's first attempt at running a chain of restaurants outside of their resorts. The two locations were paired with a Disney Store, and operated from April 21, 1990, to April 1, 1992.

On April 21, 1990, the 50th Disney Store opened at the Montclair Plaza mall (now Montclair Place) located in Montclair, California, along with the first Mickey's Kitchen fast food restaurant. 25,000 visitors had shown up, without any promotions. This location was opened as an experiment, with 190 seats taking up 6,000 square feet (560 m^{2}) out of a total 12,000 square feet (1,100 m^{2}) for the paired location. The second location opened on May 31, 1991, at the Woodfield Mall, which was located in Schaumburg, Illinois. It was 14,000 square feet (1,300 m^{2}), when paired with the attached Disney Store.

On April 1, 1992, Disney closed the two Mickey's Kitchen locations, as the restaurants were only breaking even. While the concept was well received by customers, the company wanted to focus on expanding the Disney Stores to overseas locations. A few years after the closures of the restaurants, the two Disney Stores they were attached to remained open until the 2021 closure wave. The Woodfield Mall store had relocated and remodeled in the early 2000s, while the Montclair Plaza store retained the original "pink & green" Disney Store design up until its closure in March 2021.

== ESPN Store ==
ESPN—The Store was a chain of sports retail stores run by Disney Stores. The store were designed to look like a broadcast center and have interactive kiosks for video games and news.

With Disney purchase of Capital Cities/ABC, ESPN was a key part of the purchase, which Disney chairman/CEO Michael Eisner moving into more brand extensions from biweekly sports magazines, ESPN Grill restaurants, video games and retail stores. On September 16, 1997, Disney Stores opened its first ESPN—The Store at the Glendale Galleria, with sportscaster Dick Vitale providing color. Two additional locations were opened. In September 1999, all three stores in the chain were closed down.

Merchandise in the store consisted the usual branded clothing, collectibles and equipment like binoculars and radio headphones. Collectibles included one of kind collector's memorabilia like boxing gloves signed by Muhammad Ali ($350), and jerseys signed by basketball superstars Michael Jordan ($950) and Magic Johnson ($450). Sporting equipment was sold under the X Games name, ESPN's brand of "Extreme Games" competitions.

== Online presence ==
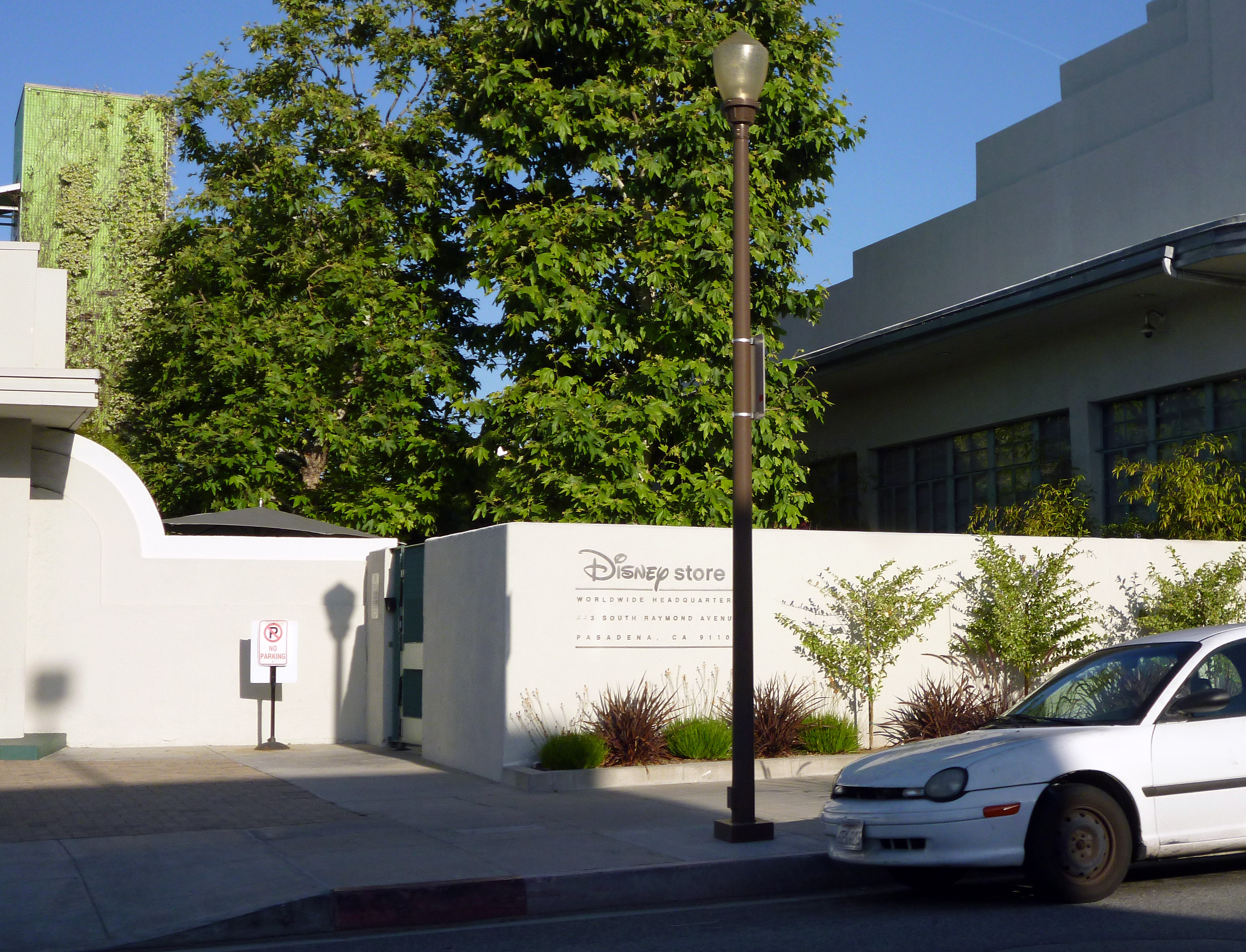
Entrance to former Disney Store headquarters in Pasadena

Online retail at The Walt Disney Company began on November 19, 1996, with the launch of The Disney Store Online. At the time, the business was under the Disney Online business unit.

In 1998, the company purchased Infoseek, and that purchase included Starwave. With that purchase there were now many other online properties under Disney Online including Disney.com, DisneyStore.com, MrShowbiz.com, Family.com, Movies.com, ESPN.com, NFL.com, NASCAR.com, NHL.com, etc. This led to a new business named Buena Vista Internet Group (BVIG) which grouped all internet sites under one business unit. In 1999, the business was changed from BVIG to Go.com and was then spun that off as a tracking stock. Also in 1999 the DisneyStore.com business was moved under a business named Disney Direct Marketing (DDM). DDM was a business entity under the company's Disney Consumer Products (DCP) division and ran the Disney Catalog. At the same time all of this was happening, the team that ran the DisneyStore.com site also built and launched ESPNStore.com, NASCARStore.com, DisneyTickets.com and DisneyAuctions.com.

Disney Auctions was created in October 2000 with a partnership between The Walt Disney Company and eBay. Items such as signs and ride vehicles from Disneyland Resort and Walt Disney World Resort were commonly sold as well as costume pieces and props from previously released movies from Walt Disney Studios.

In 2001, DDM was moved directly under the control of The Disney Stores business. The sale of The Disney Stores to The Children's Place didn't include the sale of DDM but did include the sale of the DisneyStore.com domain name, so in 2004 DisneyStore.com was changed to DisneyDirect.com.

In 2006, a complete rebranding was done. Disney Direct Marketing, Inc. was changed to Disney Shopping, Inc. (DSI), the domain was changed from DisneyDirect.com to DisneyShopping.com and the Disney Catalog business was shut down. In fall of 2006, Disney ended their partnership with eBay and moved the Disney Auctions website under its own banner.

In 2008, after the repurchase of the Disney Store business from The Children's Place, the domain was changed back to DisneyStore.com. In 2009, DisneyAuctions.com was completely shut down. In 2010, DSI was moved back under the control of the newly reacquired Disney Store business and a complete redesign of the site was launched. Also in 2010, the Disneystore.co.uk site was completely rebuilt on the same platform as the US site. The Walt Disney Company acquired Marvel Entertainment in 2009 and that same year, DisneyAuctions.com was completely shut down and that domain now redirects visitors to DisneyStore.com. In 2011, MarvelStore.com was relaunched using the same technology as the Disney Store website. A new online store for the French market was launched and a new store for the German market was launched.

For a time between 2020 and 2023, the sites were branded ShopDisney.

A special Disney World vintage apparel line called "YesterEars" was available at the online store for a limited time in August 2016. YesterEars products pay homage to classic park attractions and destinations and is named after the former Downtown Disney Pleasure Island shop. Additional products would be announced in September.
