= ESPN Zone =

Defunct theme restaurant chain

- Type: Division
- Industry: Restaurant and entertainment
- Founded: July 11, 1998; 28 years ago
- Founder: Art Levitt
- Defunct: June 2, 2018; 8 years ago
- Fate: Dissolved
- Headquarters: Los Angeles, California
- Key people: Art Levitt; (president, Disney Regional Entertainment); Bill Freeman; (vice president and general manager)
- Parent: Walt Disney Parks and Resorts

ESPN Zone was a theme restaurant and entertainment center chain in the United States that included arcades, TV studios, and radio studios, operated by the Disney Regional Entertainment subsidiary of Walt Disney Parks and Resorts using the Disney-owned ESPN brand. ESPN Zone was founded by Art Levitt on July 11, 1998 and became defunct on June 2, 2018. While the ESPN Zone name is no longer used, the similar ESPN Grill at ESPN Wide World of Sports is located within the Walt Disney World complex in Bay Lake, Florida with counter service and light theming. ESPN Club at Disney's BoardWalk Resort closed in 2022.

== Background ==
In 1992, Art Levitt conceived of an ESPN/Disney project, while he was Disney Parks and Resorts vice president of resorts and special projects, to increase Disney's Pleasure Island's attractions. Levitt's concept was "to put an ESPN experience in Disney World". Despite discussions with ESPN, the project was not immediately given the green light. Levitt exited Disney for the CEO post at Hard Rock Cafe International. The ESPN Club sports bar, at Walt Disney World with 13,000 square feet of TV screens, was a modest attempt that came from those discussions, and drew enough attendance as a proof of concept. The restaurant opened on July 1, 1996, at the BoardWalk entertainment complex.

A similar project, Sports Center USA, led by Lynda O'Dea working with ABC Sports, attempted to get started in the early 1990s with its selected first location at Baltimore's Power Plant. A lack of financing ended this project that was done in conjunction with Capital Cities/ABC, Inc.

== History ==
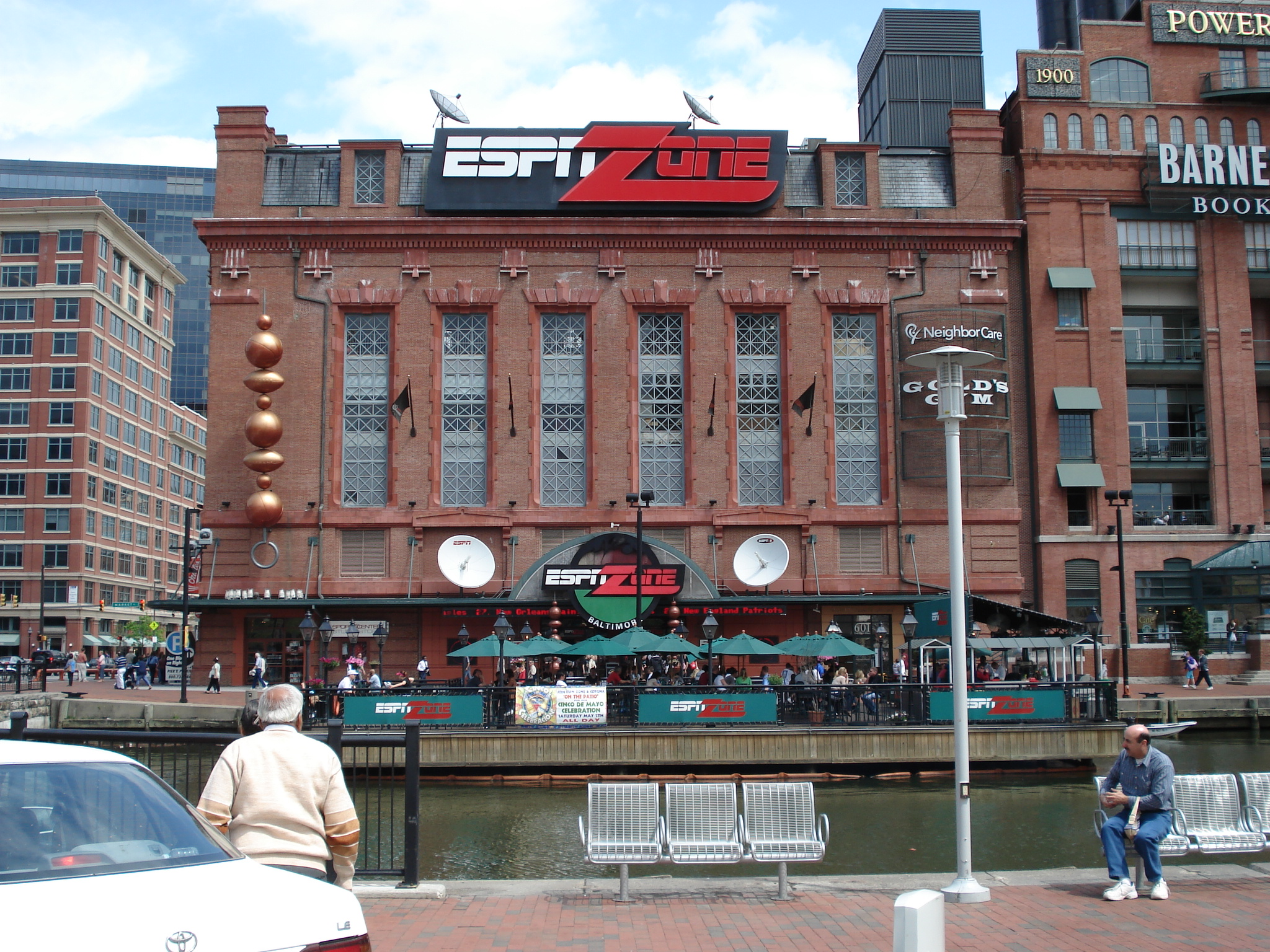
ESPN Zone in Baltimore in 2007

With Disney's purchase of Capital Cities/ABC in 1996, ESPN was a key part of the purchase, which Disney chair/CEO Michael Eisner then moved into additional brand extensions from biweekly sports magazine, ESPN-themed restaurants, video games to retail stores. With Levitt having the original idea in 1992, Eisner turned to him to head up Disney Regional Entertainment, the subsidiary that would start up and run the chain.

The concept was originally called ESPN Grill when announced in October 1997, with a slate of major city locations scheduled to start with Baltimore, Maryland, in mid-1998 and Chicago in spring 1999. ESPN Grill was renamed on December 29, 1997, to ESPN Zone to connote that there was more to the venue. The first ESPN Zone opened in Baltimore, Maryland, on July 11, 1998, in the Power Plant on the Inner Harbor.

The Chicago location opened on July 10, 1999, in the North Bridge development where DisneyQuest, a fellow Disney Regional chain, opened a month earlier. After the Chicago location opening, there was to be a new location every three months.

=== Closures ===
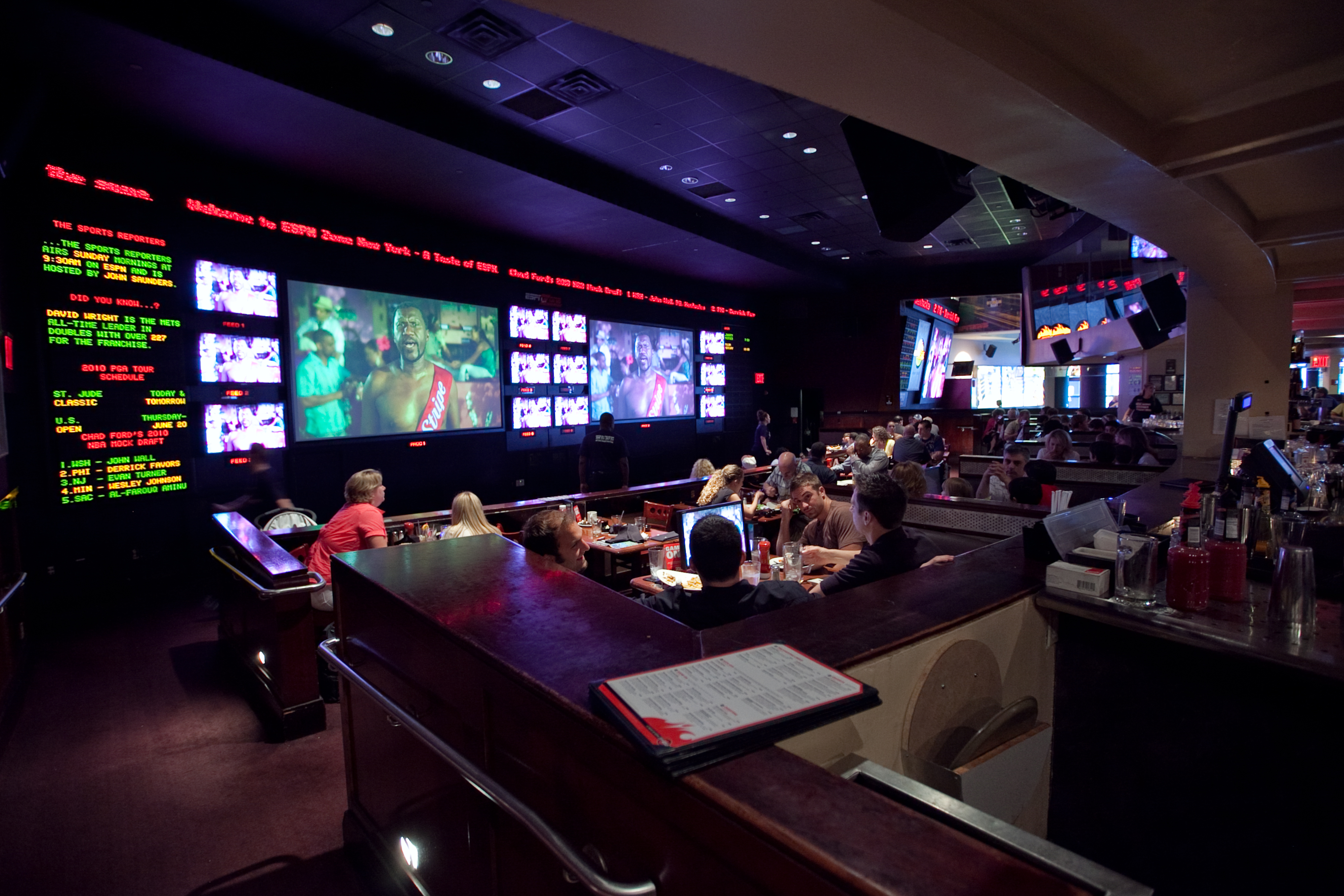
ESPN Zone interior in Times Square, New York, in 2010

In 2009, Disney Regional Entertainment closed two ESPN Zone locations. A restaurant in Denver closed in June, and another in Atlanta closed in October of that year. The Atlanta location had opened in 2000, while the Denver location opened in 2001. In both cases, Disney Regional Entertainment cited the "economic environment" as the reason for the closures.

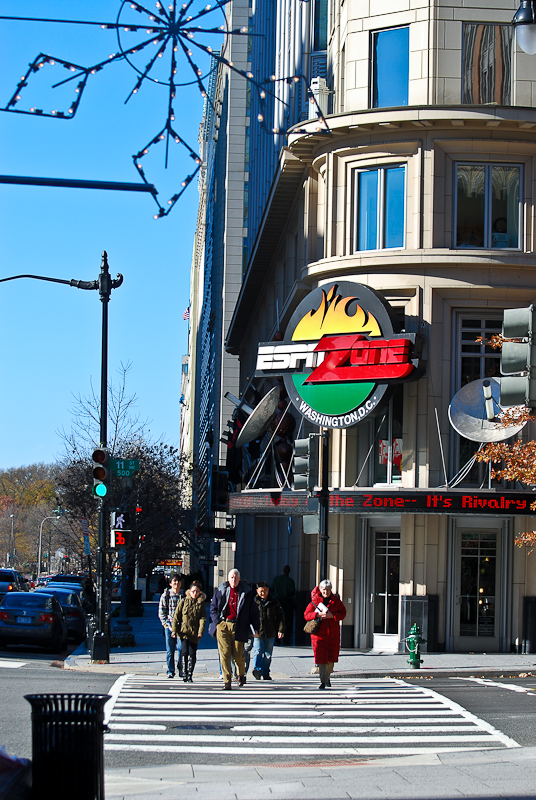
Now-closed ESPN Zone in downtown Washington, D.C.

In June 2010, all but two locations were shuttered, with the remaining restaurants located in Southern California. As part of the decision by Walt Disney Parks and Resorts, through their Disney Regional Entertainment division, to no longer operate the restaurants in 2010, they sold the rights to operate the location in Anaheim to Zone Enterprises of Anaheim, another Disney subsidiary, and the L.A. Live location to Anschutz Entertainment Group, which owns the L.A. Live complex.

==== Baltimore lawsuit ====
Employees at the Baltimore ESPN Zone filed a class action lawsuit against Disney and its local subsidiary after the 2010 closing, claiming that Disney had violated the Worker Adjustment and Retraining Notification Act of 1988. U.S. federal district judge Catherine C. Blake, in a January 2013 decision, found that Disney and its local subsidiary violated the Act by failing to notify workers of the closing and underpaying them. Disney and the employees settled the lawsuit in November 2013; Disney paid approximately 70 percent of the employees' back pay.

==== Final closures ====
The Los Angeles location, housed in the ESPN West Coast headquarters building, closed in July 2013.

In October 2017, Disney announced plans to replace ESPN Zone and other Downtown Disney vendors at the Disneyland Resort with a resort hotel (which has since been canceled), in conjunction with the opening of Star Wars: Galaxy's Edge in 2019. The restaurant closed on June 2, 2018.

== Features ==
The prototype ESPN Zone was a two-level, 35,000 square foot complex with a stadium-like design which could hold 550 customers. People could dine at the bar or restaurant area. 200 television screens were hung from the walls and ceilings. There were two special rooms, a screening room and a 10,000 square foot arena for actual and virtual game play.

ESPN Zone incorporated sports news into daily operations. Each shift, all staff were to receive daily sports news briefings. Placemats would be generated daily as a mini-sports page of a newspaper. The chain was to change its exclusive program, games, and memorabilia regularly.

=== Broadcast facility ===
All of the ESPN Zone restaurants were equipped to be remote ESPN broadcast locations, though only two were used to house regular series. The Anaheim ESPN Zone was the home of Unscripted with Chris Connelly, from 2001 to 2002. The ESPN Zone in New York City's Times Square was used as the location of the Monday Night Football halftime show for several years. The weekly series The Sports Reporters was broadcast from the Times Square location every Sunday morning from its opening until its closing, at which point the show moved to ESPN's home base in Bristol, Connecticut.

Several of the locations also had radio studios, used by the local ESPN Radio affiliate and leased to other stations on occasion.

== Events ==
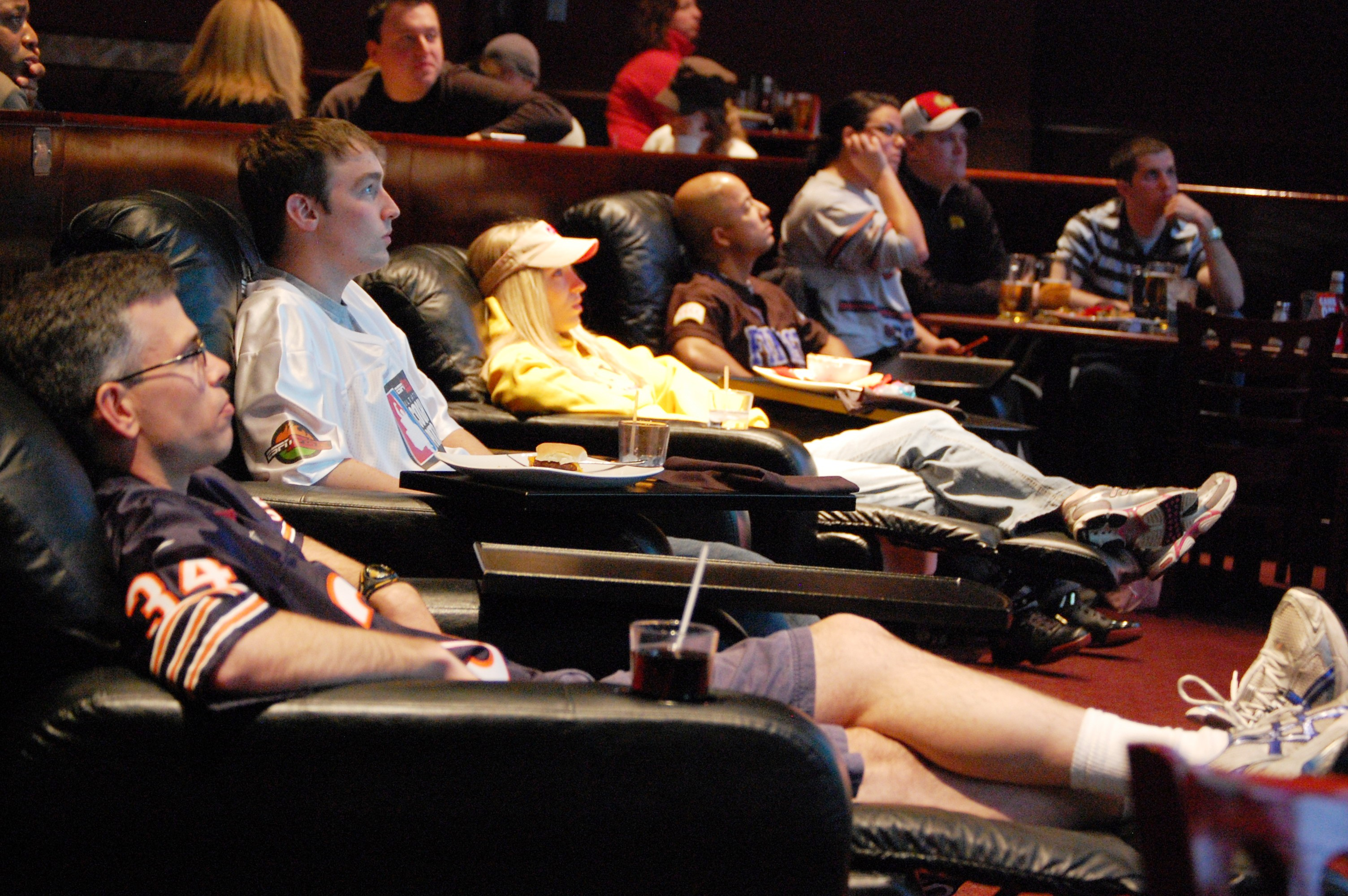
The 2009 Ultimate Couch Potato Competition at ESPN Zone Chicago

ESPN Zone hosted the Ultimate Couch Potato Competition, a competitive sitting competition. In 2009, competitions were held in New York, Chicago and Baltimore. The Baltimore winner, Jessica Mosley, unofficially broke the Guinness World Record by sitting and watching consecutive sports for an unprecedented 70 hours, and 45 seconds. She repeated as Baltimore champion in 2010. The 2009 event received attention nationally, as well as from international outlets like the popular Australian television show Sunrise. Jeff Miller, the 2010 winner in Chicago, broke an ESPN Zone record and also unofficially broke the Guinness World Record by watching 72 hours of non-stop sports and his third win in the competition.

== Former locations ==
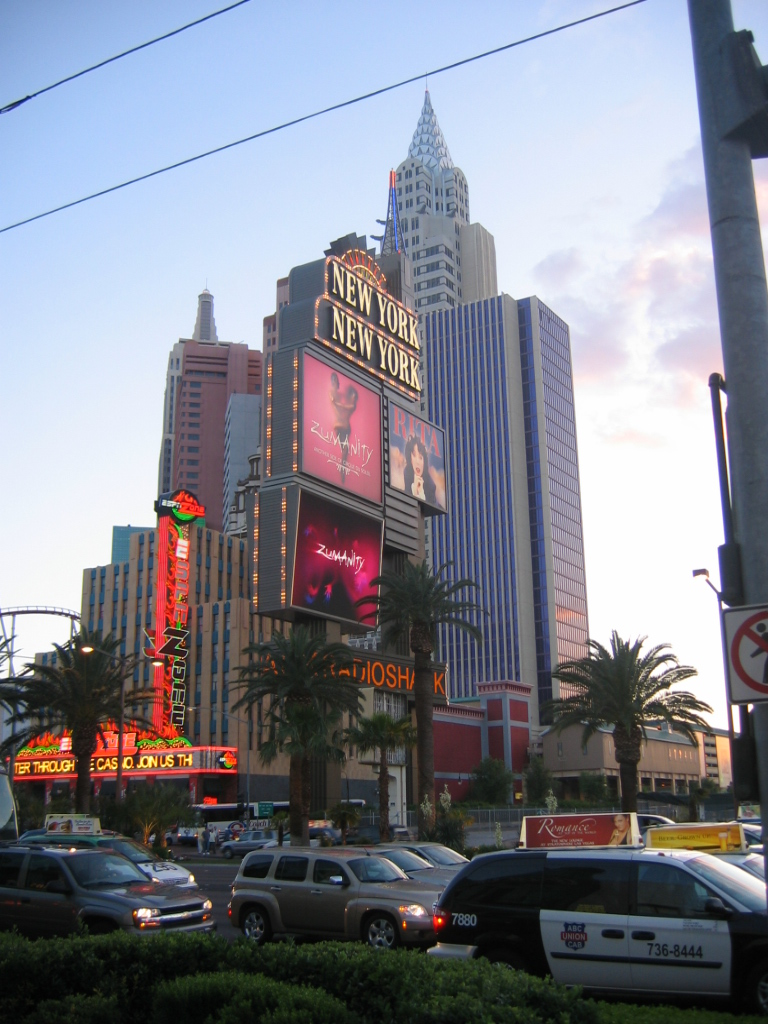
The ESPN Zone marquee is visible at the New York-New York Hotel and Casino in the Las Vegas Strip in 2006.

- 4 Times Square, New York City, New York
- Atlanta, Georgia
- Downtown Disney, Disneyland Resort, Anaheim, California
- Pratt Street Power Plant, Inner Harbor, Baltimore, Maryland
- Denver, Colorado
- Chicago, Illinois
- New York-New York Hotel and Casino, Las Vegas Strip, Paradise, Nevada
- L.A. Live, Los Angeles, California
- Thurman Arnold Building, Downtown, Washington, District of Columbia

== See also ==
- Dave & Buster's
- GameWorks
- Niketown, a New York high-tech museum-grade retail project
- Planet Hollywood
- Rainforest Cafe
