= Club Disney =

Regional children's play center concept

- Club Disney promotional graphic for the Thousand Oaks grand opening, February 1997.
- Current owner: Disney Regional Entertainment
- Introduced: February 21, 1997
- Discontinued: November 1, 1999

Club Disney was a regional children's play center concept operated by Disney Regional Entertainment. The indoor centers were designed for families with children under 10 with various play areas, snack bars and gift shops. The clubs were expected to change over time and to reflect the current Disney movie.

== History ==
Disney Regional Entertainment was formed in 1996 to develop locally based entertainment concepts. Soon after the purchase of Capital Cities/ABC Inc., Disney CEO Michael Eisner moved forward with his idea of having local entertainment based on Disney brands in metropolitan and suburban areas. Several concepts were placed in the planning stage.

Club Disney was the first to be launched, with birthday party reservations for its first location opening on January 15, 1997. On February 21, 1997, its first location opened to the public at the Westlake Promenade in Thousand Oaks, California, with Eisner present alongside Mickey Mouse and Goofy. A dozen protested outside over wages, holding placards saying "Disney Pays Mickey Mouse Wages." The protestors called themselves Alliance for Democracy and claimed workers in Haiti made 28 cents an hour to make Pocahontas pajamas. Twenty Ventura County sheriff's deputies were on hand as Disney expected tens of thousands to show up. While the lines were long to get in, the expected turnout did not materialize with 1,000 waiting at the 10 AM opening. Wunderman Cato Johnson’s San Francisco office handled the advertising for the first location, while Club Disney put out a request for bids for the launch of its second location in West Covina, California, which was expected to open in December 1997.

A complaint was filed in March 1997 over the coloring of the Thousand Oaks location. A report indicated that it met design guidelines but the checkerboard paint pattern on top of the club was not approved.

In August 1998, Disney Regional announced an expansion for Club Disney in late 1998 and early 1999. By December 1998, a location in Chandler, Arizona, near Phoenix was expected to open, while locations in Lone Tree, Colorado, Glendale, Arizona, and others were planned for 1999. The Glendale, Arizona Club opened in February 1999.

In October 1999, Disney announced that all five Club locations would be shut down, with their last day of operation being November 1, 1999. The chain was not as profitable as Disney had expected, which was done amid a Disney conglomerate-wide capital-spending review by Eisner, due to pressure to stop falling earnings and stock prices. Some parents felt that they were overpaying for their admission. Toys for Tots received any unsold goods in the club shop, while the computers were donated to schools (the Thousand Oaks location computers went to Conejo Unified School District).

== Operations ==
The locations were designed for repeated visits of three hours in length with a fixed entry fee, and to draw in customers from a 30-mile radius. To expand visits beyond the weekend, there were multiple weekday admission programs, school groups' educational field trips, themed birthday parties and multi-session workshops. The birthday parties included cake, pizza, entertainers and invitations. An example multi-session workshop was Poohrobics, a parent and child stretching and exercise program led by Winnie the Pooh for 10 weeks. Annual passes and prepaid tickets were also sold. There were about a dozen rooms for private events at a location.

List of featured attractions:

- Club House Cafe
- Clubhouse Shop
- Jungle Climber
- Applaudeville Theater
- Mouse Pad

== See also ==
- Chuck E. Cheese
- Discovery Zone
- DisneyQuest
