= Disney Regional Entertainment =

Former subsidiary of Walt Disney Parks and Resorts

- Company type: Subsidiary
- Industry: location base entertainment
- Founded: July 12, 1996; 29 years ago
- Founders: Michael D. Eisner; Art Levitt
- Defunct: June 16, 2010
- Fate: Closed in 2010, ESPN Zone spun off, DisneyQuest Orlando became part of Walt Disney Parks and Resorts.
- Key people: Art Levitt (president); Jay Rasulo (SVP)
- Parent: Walt Disney Company (1996–1998); Walt Disney Parks and Resorts; (December 1998–2010)

Disney Regional Entertainment was the subsidiary of Walt Disney Parks and Resorts which developed and operated unique local entertainment concepts. It previously operated the Club Disney, DisneyQuest, and ESPN Zone chain entertainment concepts.

== History ==
Disney Regional Entertainment was formed in 1996 to develop local based entertainment concepts. Soon after the purchase of Capital Cities/ABC Inc., which owns 80% of ESPN, Disney CEO Michael D. Eisner moved forward with his idea to having local entertainment based on Disney brands in metropolitan and suburban area. Eisner selected Art Levitt, who was previously Disney Parks and Resorts vice president of resorts and special projects then CEO of Hard Rock Cafe International. As Disney Parks and Resorts vice president of resorts and special projects, Levitt was responsible for Pleasure Island, the Disney Village Marketplace and the Disney Village Resort and spearhead the initial plans for ESPN Club, which was initial conceptually similar to ESPN Zone.

Several concepts were placed in the planning stage. Club Disney was the first to be launched on February 21, 1997 at the Westlake Promenade in Thousand Oaks, California with another in Southern California opened later that year.

On June 19, 1998, Disney Regional Entertainment opened its first DisneyQuest, a location-based entertainment venue, at Downtown Disney West Side in Walt Disney World. The company opened its first ESPN Zone on July 11, 1998 at Power Plant in the Inner Harbor, Baltimore.

Projects	concept	first opened	Maximum opened
Club Disney	children's entertainment centers	February 21, 1997	5
DisneyQuest	indoor arcade with traditional and virtual reality experiences	June 19, 1998	2
ESPN Zone	sports-themed restaurants	July 11, 1998	9

On August 28, 1998, Disney Regional announced an expansion for Club Disney for late 1998 and 1999. In December 1998, Disney Regional Entertainment was transferred with a couple of other units into Walt Disney Attractions.

The first DisneyQuest outside of a resort was opened in Chicago on June 16, 1999 with plans for more locations worldwide. In October 1999, Disney announced that the Club chain would be shut down with their last day of operation being November 1, 1999. On September 4, 2001, the Chicago DisneyQuest closed leaving only the Disney World location left.

ESPN Zone lasted longer than the other chains. As a chain it was closed down as of June 16, 2010 with five of its locations while two other continued operating by other companies, AEG and Zone Enterprises. With transfer of the remaining ESPN Zones to other companies, Disney Regional Entertainment shut down. On July 3, 2017, the final DisneyQuest closed down at Disney Springs and was demolished for the NBA Experience.

== See also ==
- Hard Rock Cafe
- Planet Hollywood
- GameWorks
