= DisneyQuest =

Former indoor Disney theme park chain

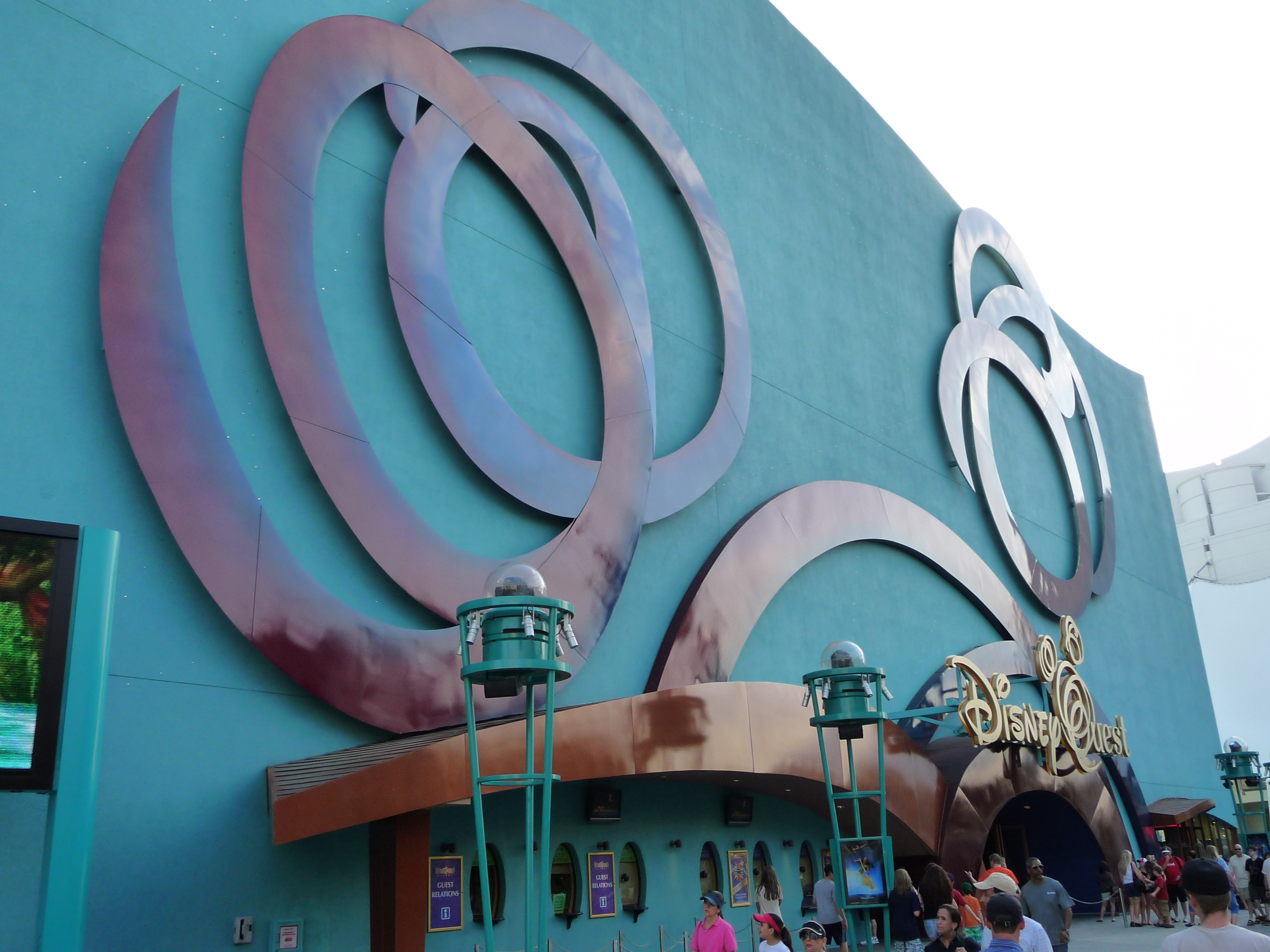
- Walt Disney World's DisneyQuest as it appeared in Disney Springs when the district was known as Downtown Disney
- Interactive map of DisneyQuest
- Location: Walt Disney World Resort, Lake Buena Vista, Florida and Chicago, Illinois, United States
- Coordinates: 28.37033°N 81.52211°W (Walt Disney World)
- Status: Defunct
- Opened: June 19, 1998 (Walt Disney World); June 16, 1999 (Chicago)
- Closed: September 3, 2001 (Chicago); July 2, 2017 (Walt Disney World)
- Operated by: Disney Regional Entertainment (1998–2010); Walt Disney Parks and Resorts (2010–2017)
- Theme: Indoor Interactive Theme Park

DisneyQuest was a chain of indoor interactive theme parks in the United States operated by the Disney Regional Entertainment subsidiary of Walt Disney Parks and Resorts.

The DisneyQuest project was designed as a way for the Disney brand to reach populations that may not have the chance to travel to its various theme park destinations. It was meant to target large cities and urban areas. Had the project continued, Disney would have constructed locations in many major cities in the United States, like Philadelphia and Baltimore. However, only two locations were built; one in Walt Disney World from June 19, 1998 to July 2, 2017 and a much shorter-lived one in Chicago from June 16, 1999 to September 3, 2001.

== History ==
DisneyQuest first opened on June 19, 1998, as part of a major expansion of the Downtown Disney entertainment district (today Disney Springs) at Downtown Disney West Side, and was intended as the first of a larger chain of similar facilities.

The first DisneyQuest outside of a resort was opened in Chicago on June 16, 1999, with plans for more locations worldwide. The Chicago location was in a development, North Bridge, where ESPN Zone, a fellow Disney Regional chain, opened about a month later.

On December 9, 1998, Disney Regional announced Philadelphia as a new location as a tenant of the Pavilion at Market East project developed by Goldenberg Group on the former location of a Gimbels Department Store.

The Chicago location permanently closed on September 3, 2001, after 2 years and 3 months of operating due to low visitor numbers as well as other, broader issues. While the location was generating income, it was not enough for Disney.

After the failure of DisneyQuest Chicago, the DisneyQuest project was officially brought to an end. Construction that had begun for DisneyQuest Philadelphia was scrapped in April 2000, leaving a giant hole in its place for several years; the hole has since been filled and the space later became a parking lot. A DisneyQuest at the Disneyland Resort in California never proceeded past the planning stage. After the closure of the Chicago location, Disney Regional Entertainment turned over control of the remaining location to Walt Disney World operations.

On June 30, 2015, Disney officials announced that the Walt Disney World location would close in 2016 as part of the continued redevelopment of Downtown Disney into Disney Springs. A spokesperson for the labor unions that represent Disney employees who work at DisneyQuest stated that displaced workers will be relocated to other positions. The property was set to be redeveloped into a new attraction themed to the NBA after they left their previous location at Universal CityWalk. In November 2016, Disney officials announced that DisneyQuest would remain open for the remainder of the year and into 2017, with no definitive closing date. They further stated that they had no update on the status of the NBA attraction other than it was still planned for the site. On January 30, 2017, the Disney Parks announced that DisneyQuest would close after July 2, 2017, so work on the NBA Experience attraction could begin. DisneyQuest's final day of operation was on July 2, 2017, and was demolished a few months later.

Its replacement, the NBA Experience, officially opened on August 12, 2019. However, due to the COVID-19 pandemic, the venue closed in March 2020, and all guest actors were laid off in October the same year. On August 16, 2021, Disney announced that the venue would not reopen. On February 19, 2025, it was reported that Level99, an escape room attraction, would replace the NBA Experience, which opened on June 29, 2026 at Disney Springs West Side.

== Former attractions ==
Name	Opened	Closed	Description
Aladdin's Magic Carpet Ride	1998	2017	A VR attraction where attendees wear a head-mounted display that simulates a magic carpet through Agrabah. Players collect gems to find The Genie, who has been hidden away in the Cave of Wonders. The attraction was previously featured at Innoventions West at Epcot between 1994 and 1997, initially as part of the Walt Disney Imagineering Labs exhibit.
Animation Academy	1998	2017	Regular sessions throughout the day teach how to draw Disney characters, step by step. In this version of the attraction, attendees draw characters on computer screens using lightpens, and can purchase a printout of their creation afterward.
Buzz Lightyear's AstroBlaster	1998	2017	Modified Bumper Car attraction, similar to that of Sega's "Mad Bazooka" ride system. Attendees board bumper cars and attempt to navigate over foam balls, called asteroids on the floor. By doing so, the asteroids will be sucked up into the cabin where players can then load them into a cannon and shoot at the other cars. If hit in the correct spot, one's car may spin around uncontrollably for ten seconds. Usually, there are two players in a car; however, it is possible for one person can pilot and shoot at the same time.
CyberSpace Mountain	1998	2017	Attendees design a roller coaster on a design kiosk, and then they sit in the pitch-and-roll motion simulators and ride it. Guests may also ride pre-built coasters. It is hosted by Bill Nye the Science Guy, who instead refers to himself as "Bill Nye the Coaster Guy". This attraction is based on the ride Space Mountain.
Invasion! An ExtraTERRORestrial Alien Encounter	1998	2017	A 3D shooting attraction based on the former Magic Kingdom attraction, ExtraTERRORestrial Alien Encounter; with actor Jeffrey Jones reprised his role as Chairman Clench. In the attraction, attendees ride inside a rescue vehicle to save astronauts: one player drives, and the other three shoot enemy aliens.
Living Easels	1998	2017	An interactive touch screen program where guests can place various images onto several selectable backgrounds. A full-color printout of a guest's design may be purchased.
Mighty Ducks Pinball Slam	1998	2017	A virtual projected pinball-type game where the attendees become the pinball. by rocking their "duck" back and forth, up to twelve players at a time control their corresponding pinball on the screen, attempting to collect the most points.
Pirates of the Caribbean: Battle for Buccaneer Gold	2000	2017	Arcade shooter attraction with 3D projections where attendees man a pirate ship and destroy other ships, sea monsters, and fortresses to collect gold. One player captains the ship by steering and controlling the throttle, while up to four gunners control the cannons to destroy other ships.
Radio Disney Song Maker	1998	2017	Guests can create their own song and buy it on a CD later during their visit.
Sid's Create-a-Toy	1998	2017	A program featuring the antagonist from Toy Story that allows one to custom design a toy out of parts of other toys, later making it available for purchase.
Virtual Jungle Cruise	1998	2017	Guests paddle an inflatable raft (with real paddles) as they make their way down a prehistoric river, avoiding dinosaurs and occasionally getting sprayed with water. It is based on the ride Jungle Cruise.

=== Prior to final closure ===
Name	Opened	Closed	Description
Cave of Wonders Slide	1998	1999	A 150-foot (46m) long spiral slide that took guests from the third floor to the first. It was closed in DisneyQuest's first year of operation.
Hercules in the Underworld	1998	2000	Six guests would each control their own character from Disney's Hercules with a joystick. The objective of the game was to collect lightning bolts and defeat Hades. This attraction was replaced with "Pirates of the Caribbean: Battle for Buccaneer Gold".
Magic Mirrors	1998	2005	Guests could take a picture of themselves and then edit their faces to appear like cartoons. The attraction closed in 2005 and was later converted to seating.
Ride the Comix	1998	2014	VR attraction where guests board a spaceship, wear a VR headset, and "enter the comic book world" where they battle with supervillains by using a laser sword. The art for the game was designed by Wildstorm artist Travis Charest. Up to six players can be on a team at a time. The attraction appeared on both the fourth and fifth floors, with two ships each. Beginning in early 2011, Ride the Comix 4 was "overtaken by villains" and in service only on days when the building was near capacity. However, guests were still able to play this game on the fifth floor directly above. On September 7, 2014, the attraction closed to make way for additional seating at the FoodQuest quick-service restaurant.
Treasure of the Incas	1998	2007	Players drive small remote-controlled toy trucks through a maze in search of treasure. Along a wall were stations with a steering wheel and a video screen by which to drive the truck; the floor of the room was clear plastic through which friends could see the trucks driving around so that they could shout directions to the driver. This attraction was plagued by interference from emerging technologies such as cell phones and was finally closed after one of the vehicles caught fire. The clear flooring and mazes could still be seen near the Virtual Jungle Cruise area, adjacent to the Safari hunting games until 2007 when the floor was recovered and new games moved to the area. This area was now entirely jungle-themed and is home to several Let's Go Jungle!: Lost on the Island of Spice arcade machines.
Virtual Pirates of the Caribbean	1998	2000	Projection screen-focused shooter attraction. After closure, the ride concept was reused for "Battle for Buccanner Gold".

All the redemption games were removed from the facility in January 2015 as a cautionary measure, in response to a state law that Disney believed made the games illegal under certain circumstances.

When DisneyQuest closed on July 2, 2017, the remaining arcade games (including the Fix-It Felix Jr. arcade games from Wreck-It Ralph) were removed, and most of them were sold or put into storage.

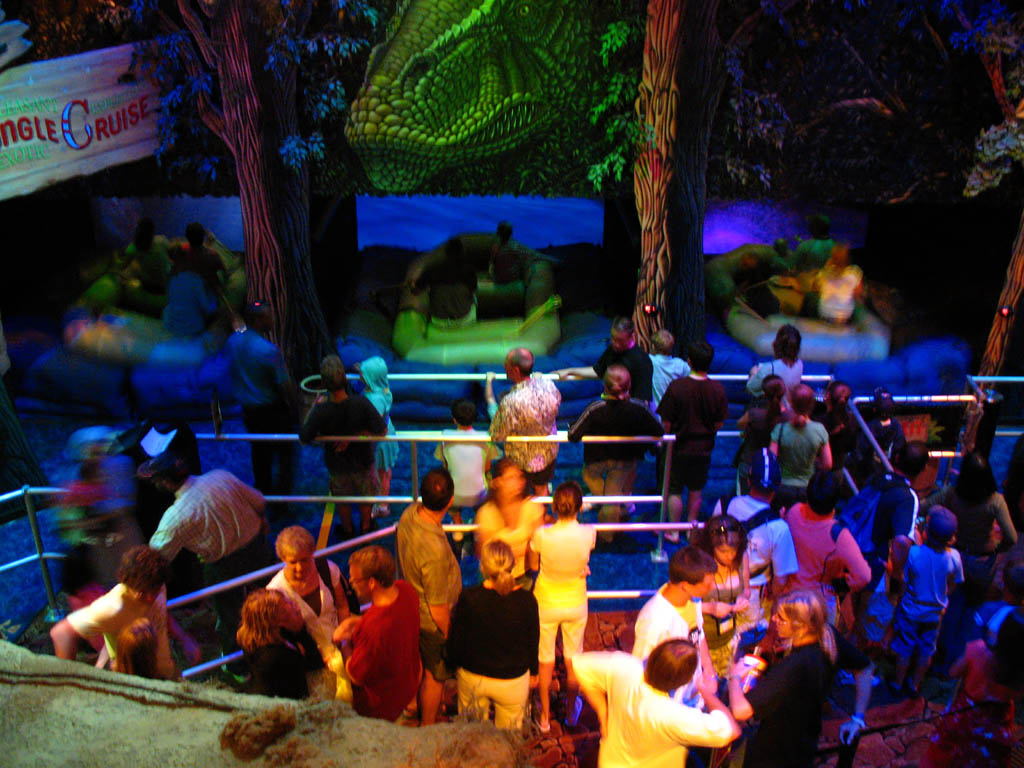
Virtual Jungle Cruise

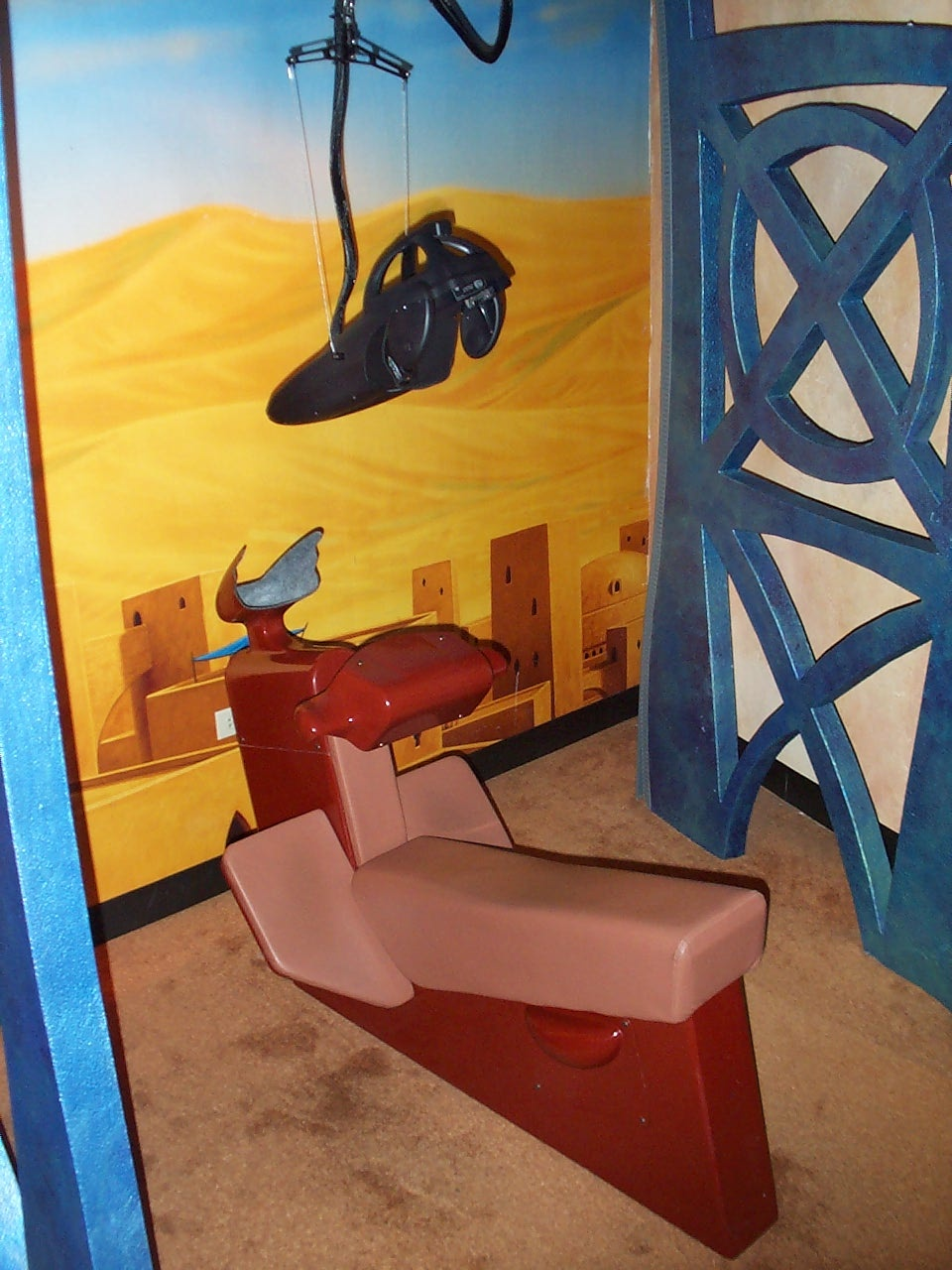
Aladdin's Magic Carpet Ride

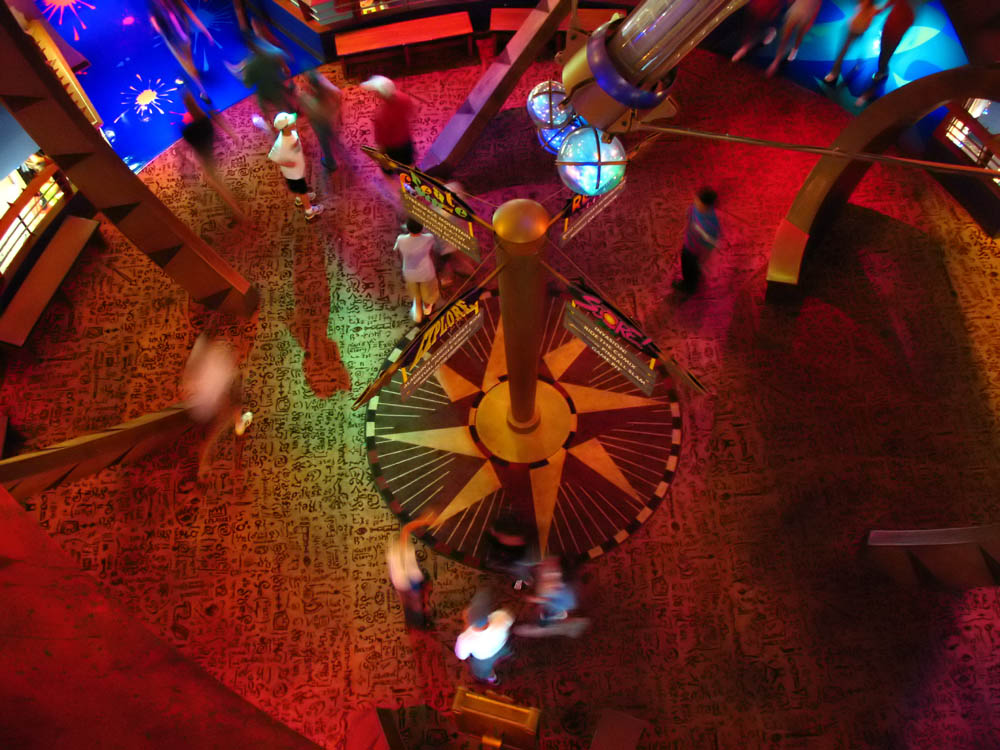
The third floor atrium

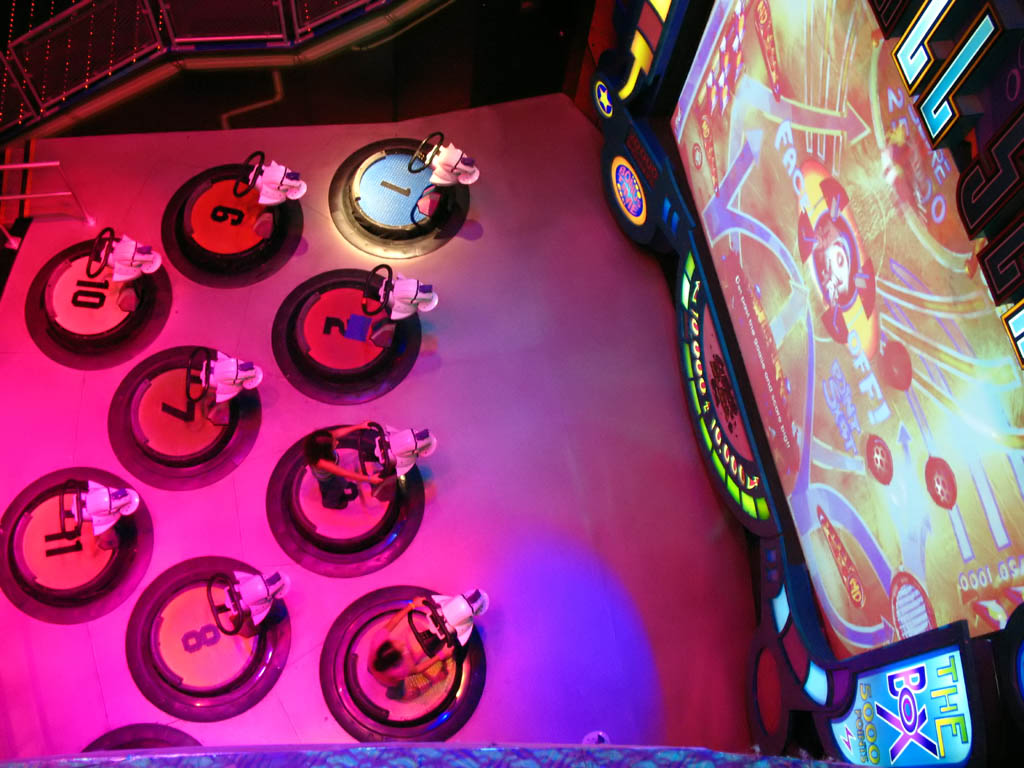
Mighty Ducks Pinball Slam

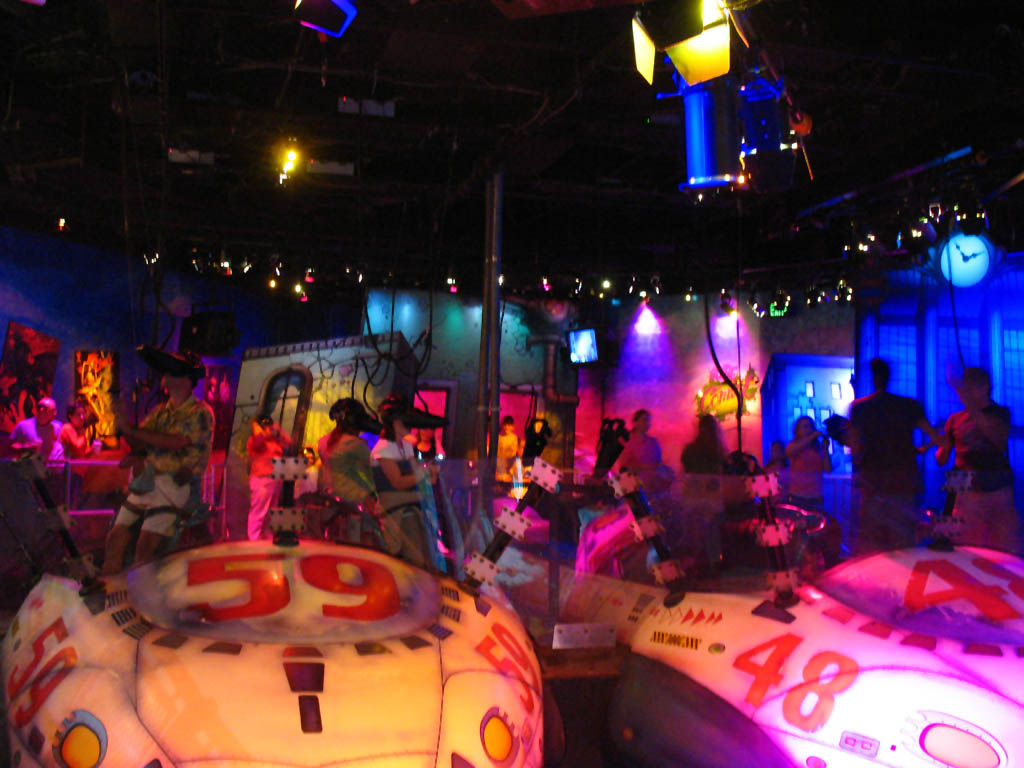
Ride the Comix

== See also ==
- Six Flags Power Plant, a similar concept that opened in 1985
