= Ice cream cone =

Pastry

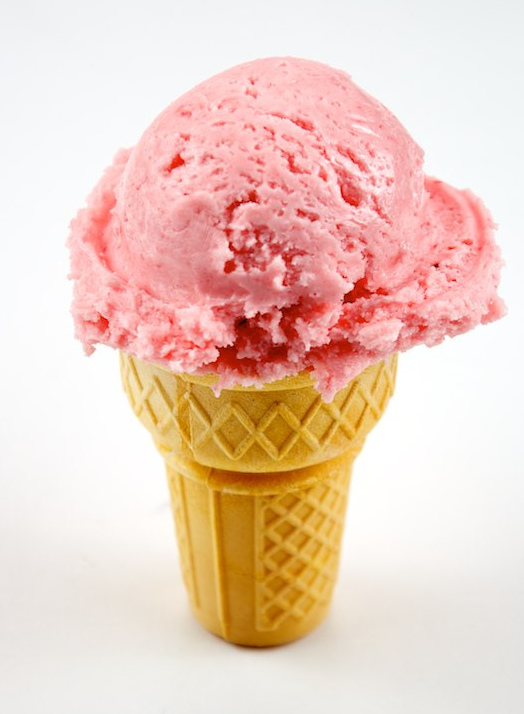
- A wafer-style ice cream cone with a scoop of strawberry ice cream
- Type: Batter
- Place of origin: United Kingdom (first documented recipe)
- Invented: 1888; 138 years ago
- Serving temperature: Dry and cold
- Main ingredients: Flour, sugar
- Variations: Waffle cone, cake cone (wafer cone), pretzel cone, sugar cone, chocolate-coated cone, double cone, vanilla cone
- Food energy (per serving): 23 kcal (96 kJ)

An ice cream cone or poke (Northern Ireland) is a brittle, cone-shaped pastry, usually made of a wafer similar in texture to a waffle, made so ice cream can be carried and eaten without a bowl or spoon. Many styles of cones are made, including Cornetto cones, sugar-coated and chocolate-coated cones (coated on the inside and outside). The term ice cream cone can also refer, informally, to the cone with one or more scoops of ice cream on top.

There are two techniques for making cones: one is by baking them flat and then quickly rolling them into shape (before they harden), the other is by baking them inside a cone-shaped mold.

== History ==
=== 19th century ===
Cones, in the form of wafers rolled and baked hard, date back to Ancient Rome and Greece. When exactly they transitioned to being used for desserts, and ice cream in particular, is not clear. Some historians point to France in the early 19th century as the birthplace of the ice cream cone: an 1807 illustration of a Parisian girl enjoying a treat may depict an ice cream cone and edible cones were mentioned in French cooking books as early as 1825, when Julien Archambault described how one could roll a cone from "little waffles". In 1846, the Italian British cook Charles Elmé Francatelli's The Modern Cook described the use of ice cream cones as part of a larger dessert dish.

The earliest certain evidence of ice cream cones come from Mrs A. B. Marshall's Book of Cookery (1888), written by the English cook Agnes B. Marshall. Her recipe for "Cornet with Cream" said that "the cornets were made with almonds and baked in the oven, not pressed between irons". Marshall is consequently often regarded to have been the inventor of the modern ice cream cone.

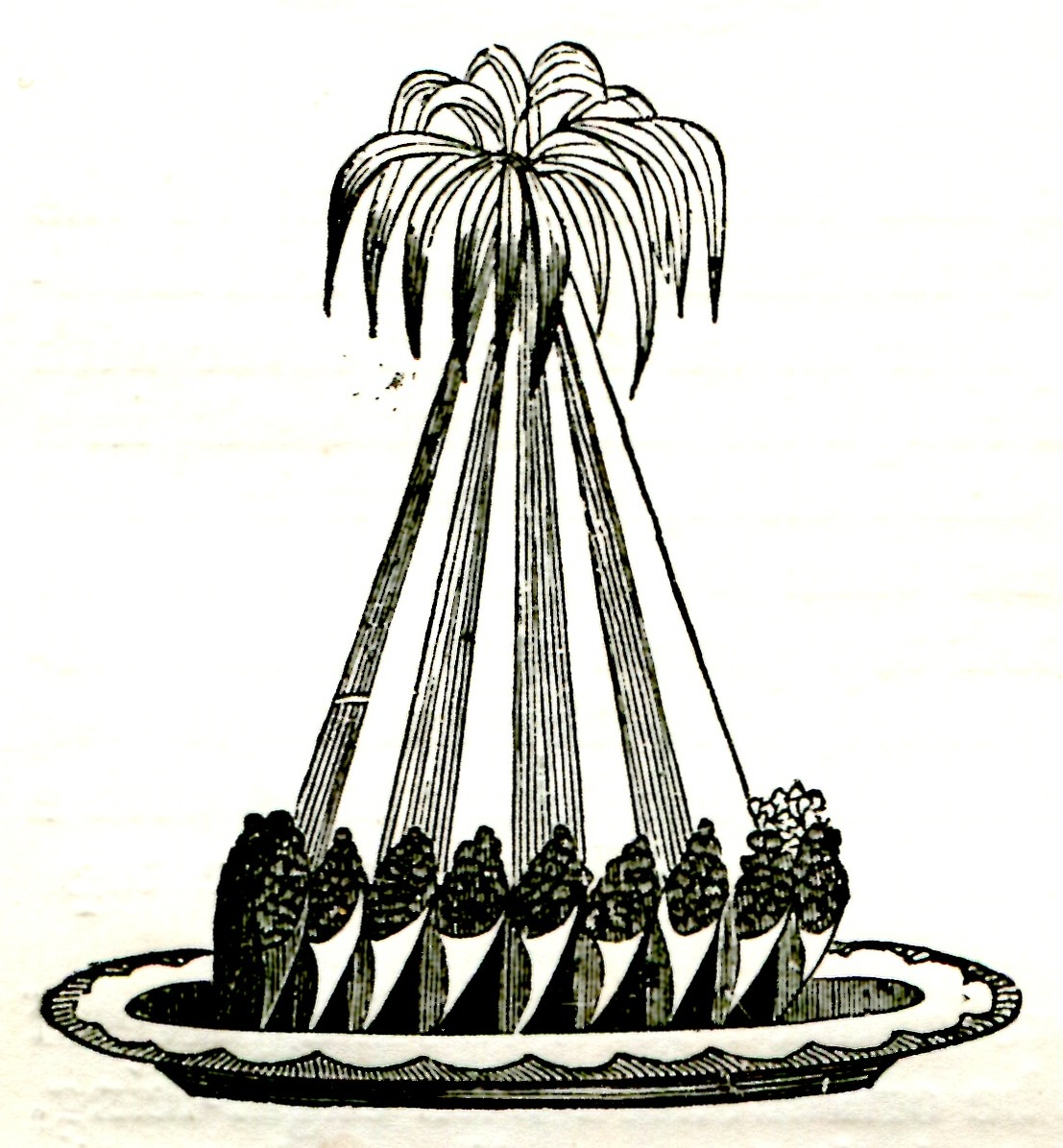
Iced Pudding, a la Chesterfield, in Charles Elmé Francatelli's The Modern Cook, first published in 1846. The illustration is one of the earliest to show something akin to ice cream cones, arranged around the base of the iced dessert. Francatelli described the cones as "gauffres, filled with some of the ice cream".

=== 20th century ===
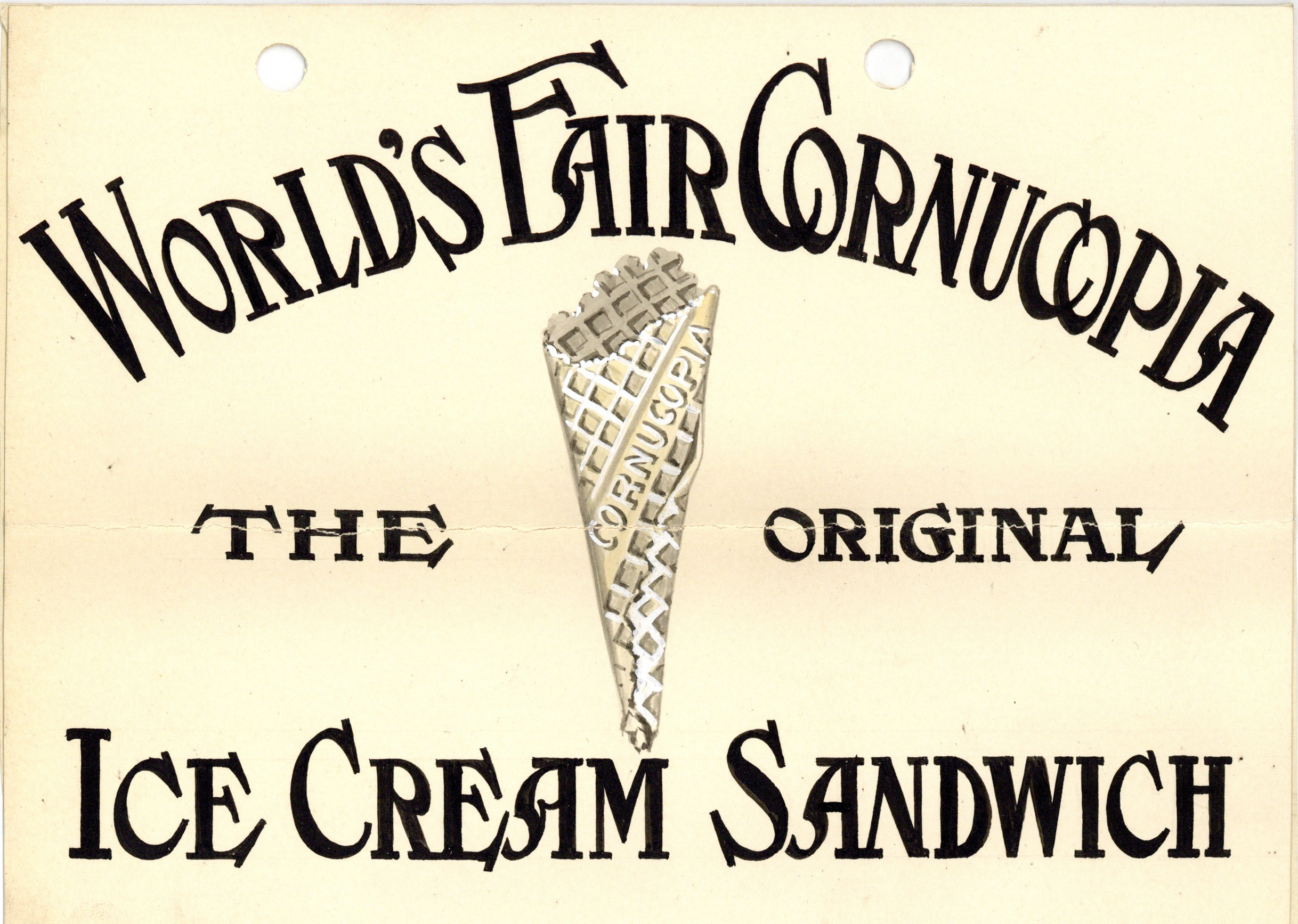
The Ice Cream Sandwich or Ice Cream Cornucopia trademark was registered with the state of Missouri and introduced at the St. Louis World's Fair in 1904.

In the United States, edible vessels for ice cream took off at the start of the 1900s. Molds for edible ice cream cups entered the scene in 1902 and 1903, with two Italian inventors and ice cream merchants. Antonio Valvona, from Manchester, patented a novel apparatus resembling a cup-shaped waffle iron, made "for baking biscuit-cups for ice-cream" over a gas range. The following year, Italo Marchiony, from New York City, patented an improved design with a break-apart bottom so that more unusual cup shapes could be created out of the delicate waffle batter.

At the St. Louis World's Fair in 1904, after an ice cream vendor ran out of paper cups, a Syrian concessionaire named Ernest A. Hamwi offered a solution by curling a waffle cookie into a receptacle for the ice cream. This is believed by some (although there is much dispute) to be the moment where ice cream cones became mainstream. Hamwi started his own cone-making company a few years later.

Abe Doumar and the Doumar family of Norfolk, Virginia, also claim credit for the ice cream cone. At 16, Doumar began selling paperweights and other items. One night, he bought a waffle from another vendor, Leonidas Kestekidès, who was transplanted from Ghent in Belgium to Norfolk. Doumar rolled the waffle on itself and placed a scoop of ice cream on top. He began selling the cones at the St. Louis Exposition. After his "cones" were successful, Doumar designed and had manufactured a four-iron baking machine. At the Jamestown Exposition in 1907, he and his brothers sold nearly twenty-three thousand cones. After that, Abe bought a semiautomatic 36-iron machine, which produced 20 cones per minute and opened Doumar's Cones and BBQ in Norfolk, which still operates at the same location.

In 2008, the ice cream cone became the official state dessert of Missouri.

=== Commerce ===
By 1912, an inventor by the name of Frederick Bruckman, from Portland, Oregon, perfected a complex machine for molding, baking, and trimming ice cream cones with incredible speed. Inventions like this paved the way for the wholesaling of ice cream cones. He sold his company in 1928 to Nabisco, which is still producing ice cream cones as of 2017. Joy Cone (Joy Baking Group) is the largest ice cream cone producer in the U.S., making over 2 billion cones annually including cake cones, sugar cones, waffle cones, and waffle bowls from multiple facilities. They are an independent, employee-owned company with over 100 years of cone baking experience, supplying many ice cream businesses. The Konery specializes in gourmet waffle cones with unique flavors and colors, producing their own cones for various ice cream shops and specialty retailers.

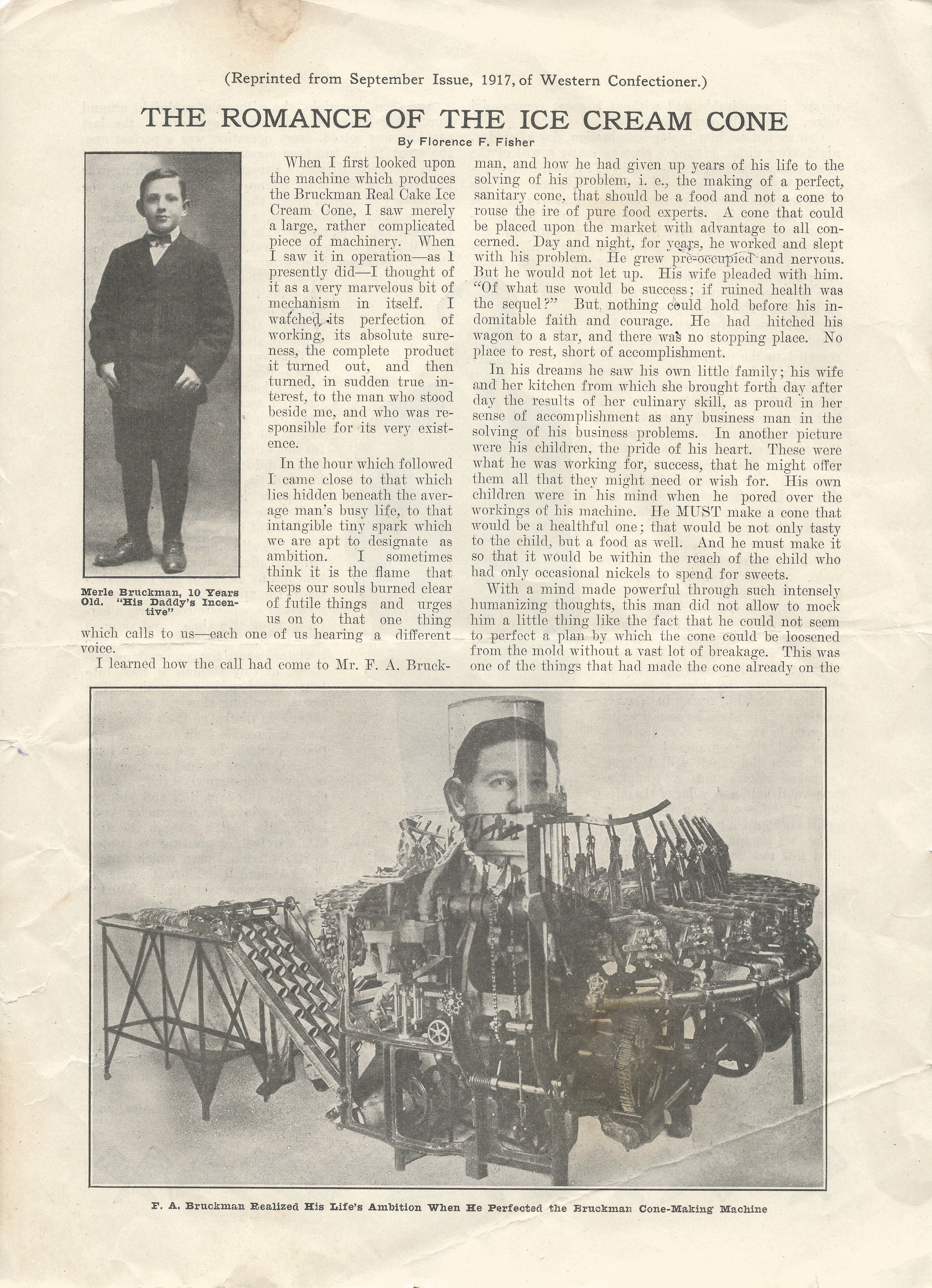
Page 1 of a September 1917 article in Western Confectioner, describing Frederick Bruckman's "Real Cake Ice Cream Cone Machine"

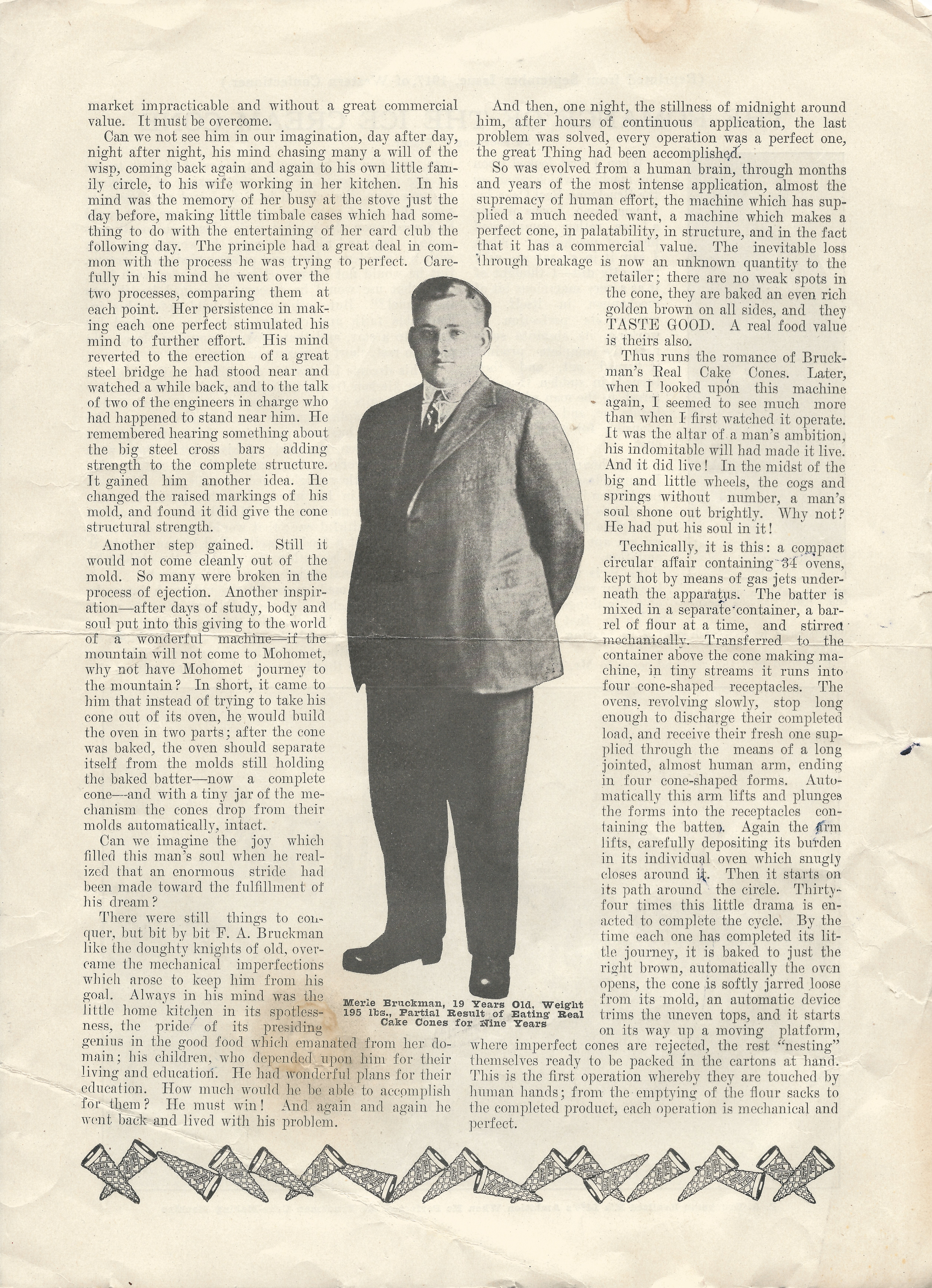
Page 2 of same article

=== Prefilling ===
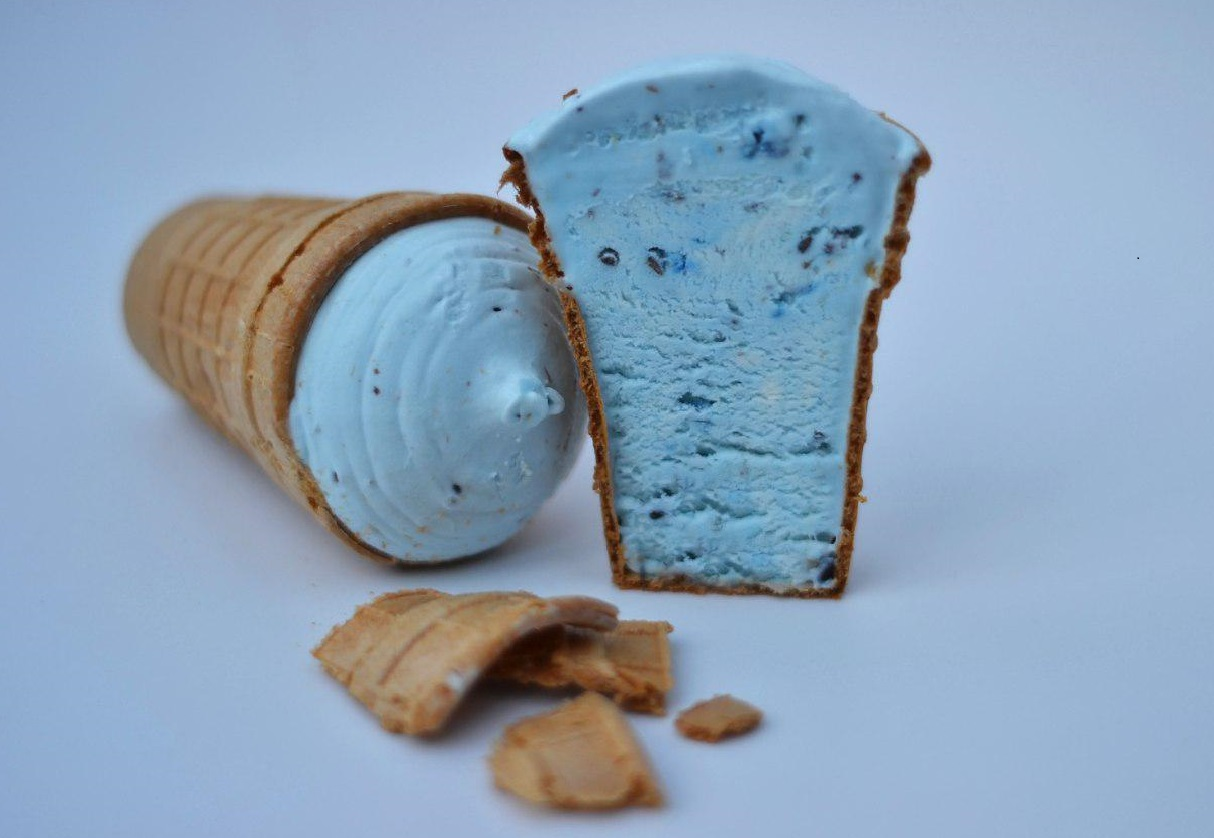
cross section of pre-filled ice cream cone

In 1928, J. T. "Stubby" Parker of Fort Worth, Texas, created an ice cream cone that could be stored in a grocer's freezer, with the cone and the ice cream frozen together as one item. He formed The Drumstick Company in 1931 to market the product, and in 1991 the company was purchased by Nestlé.

In 1959, Spica, an Italian ice cream manufacturer based in Naples, invented a process whereby the inside of the waffle cone was insulated from the ice cream by a layer of oil, sugar and chocolate. Spica registered the name Cornetto in 1960. Initial sales were poor, but in 1976 Unilever bought out Spica and began a mass-marketing campaign throughout Europe. Cornetto has since become one of the most popular ice creams in the world.

In 1979, a patent for a new packaging design by David Weinstein led to easier transportation of commercial ice cream cones. Weinstein's design enabled the ice cream cone to be wrapped in a wax paper package. This made the cones more sanitary while also preventing the paper wrapper from peeling off during transportation, or from becoming stuck to the cone.

== Gallery ==
Ice cream cones

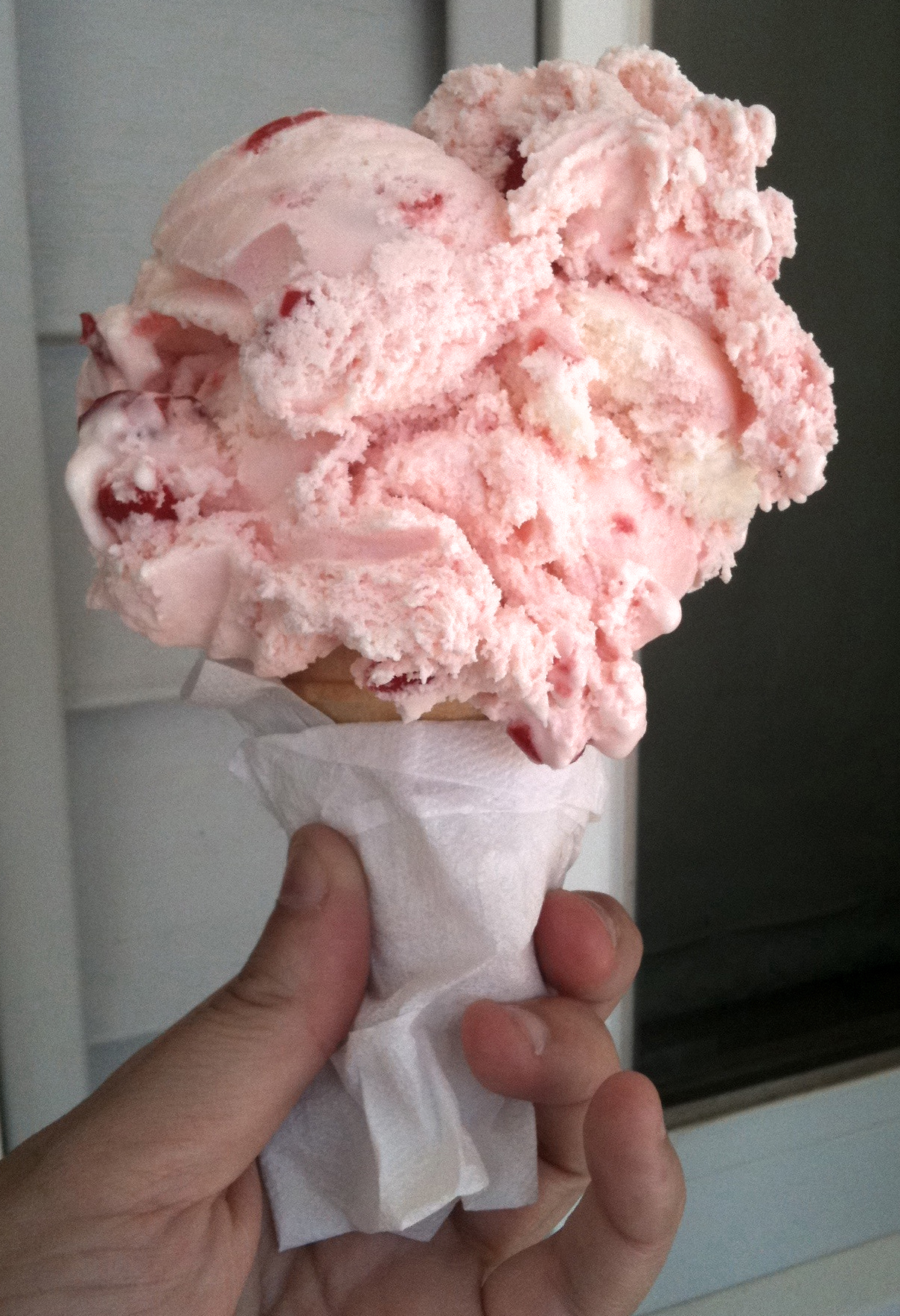
A cherry ice cream cone

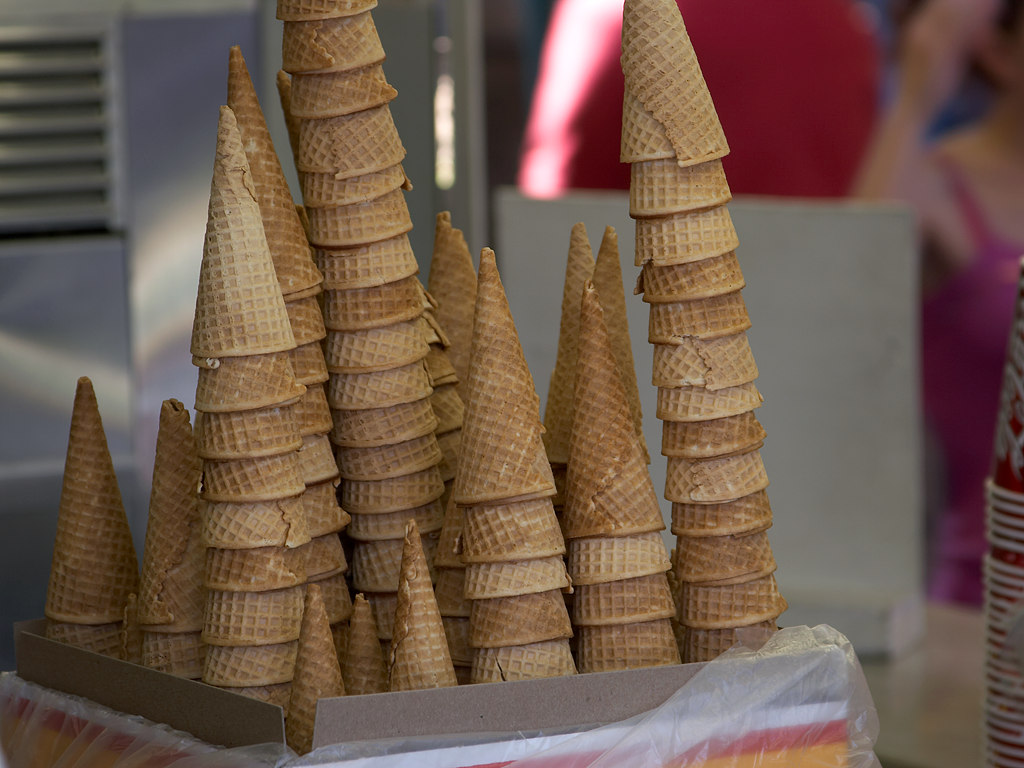
Sugar cones

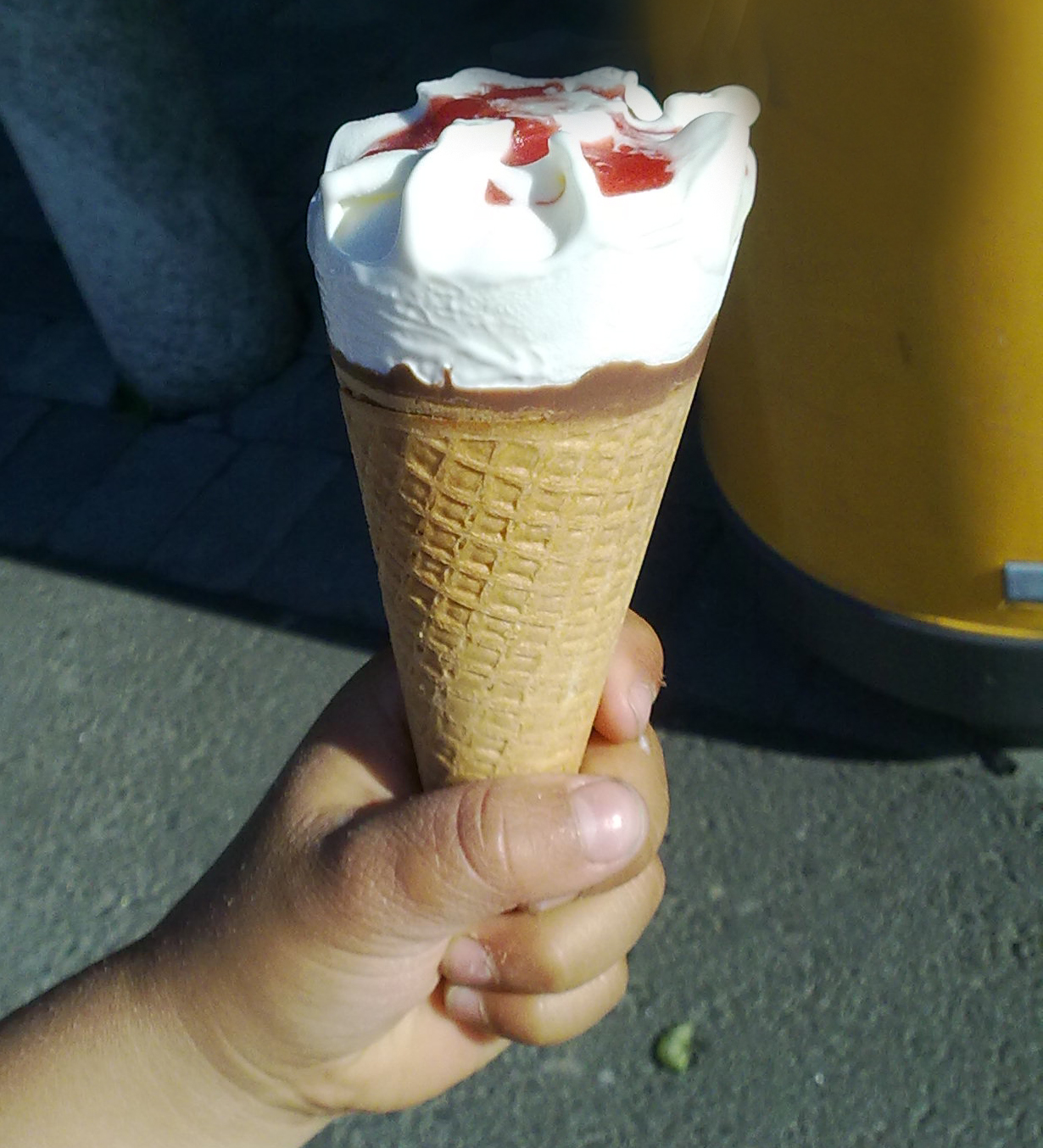
Unwrapped pre-filled cone

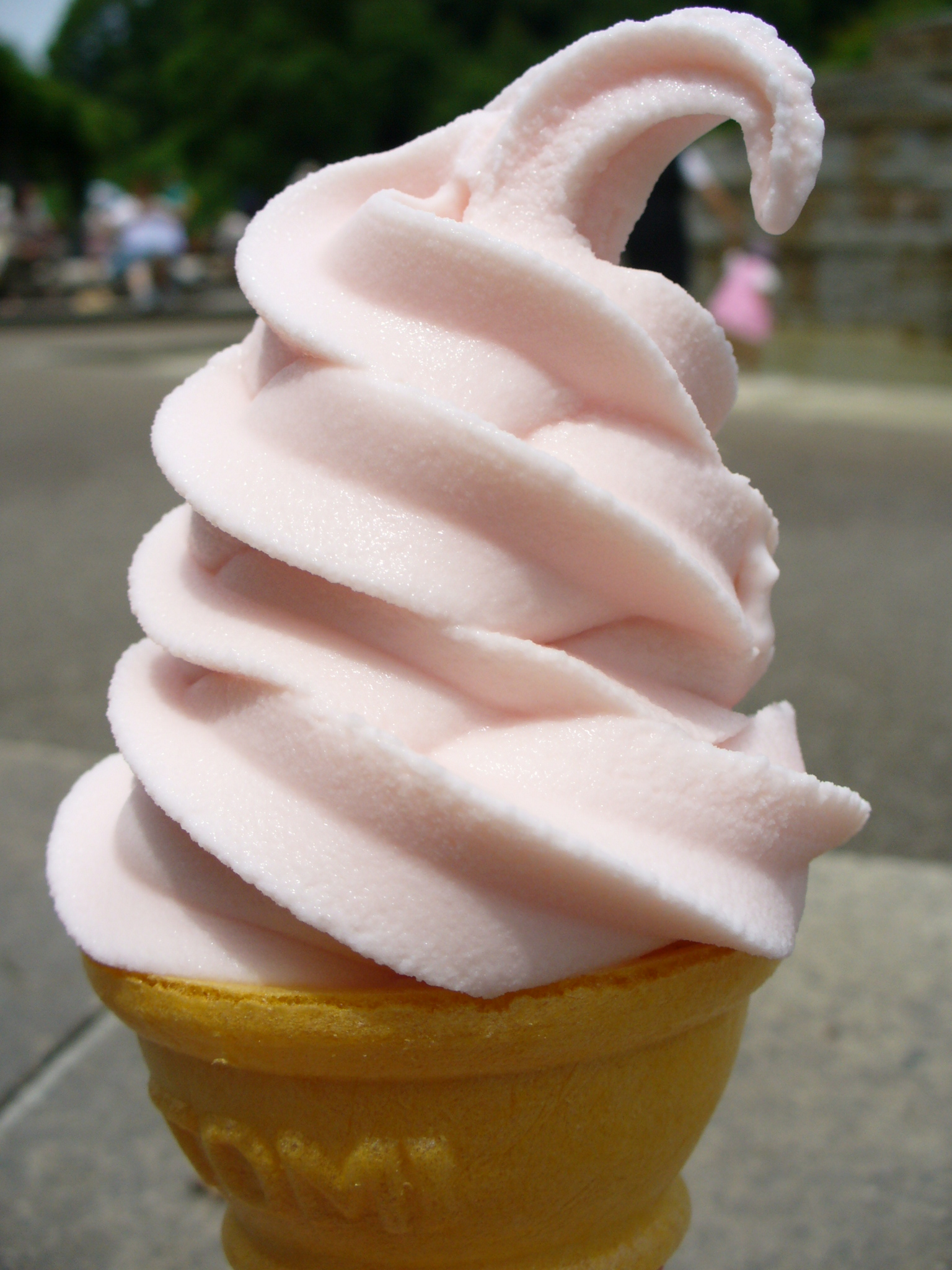
Soft serve ice cream in a wafer-style cone

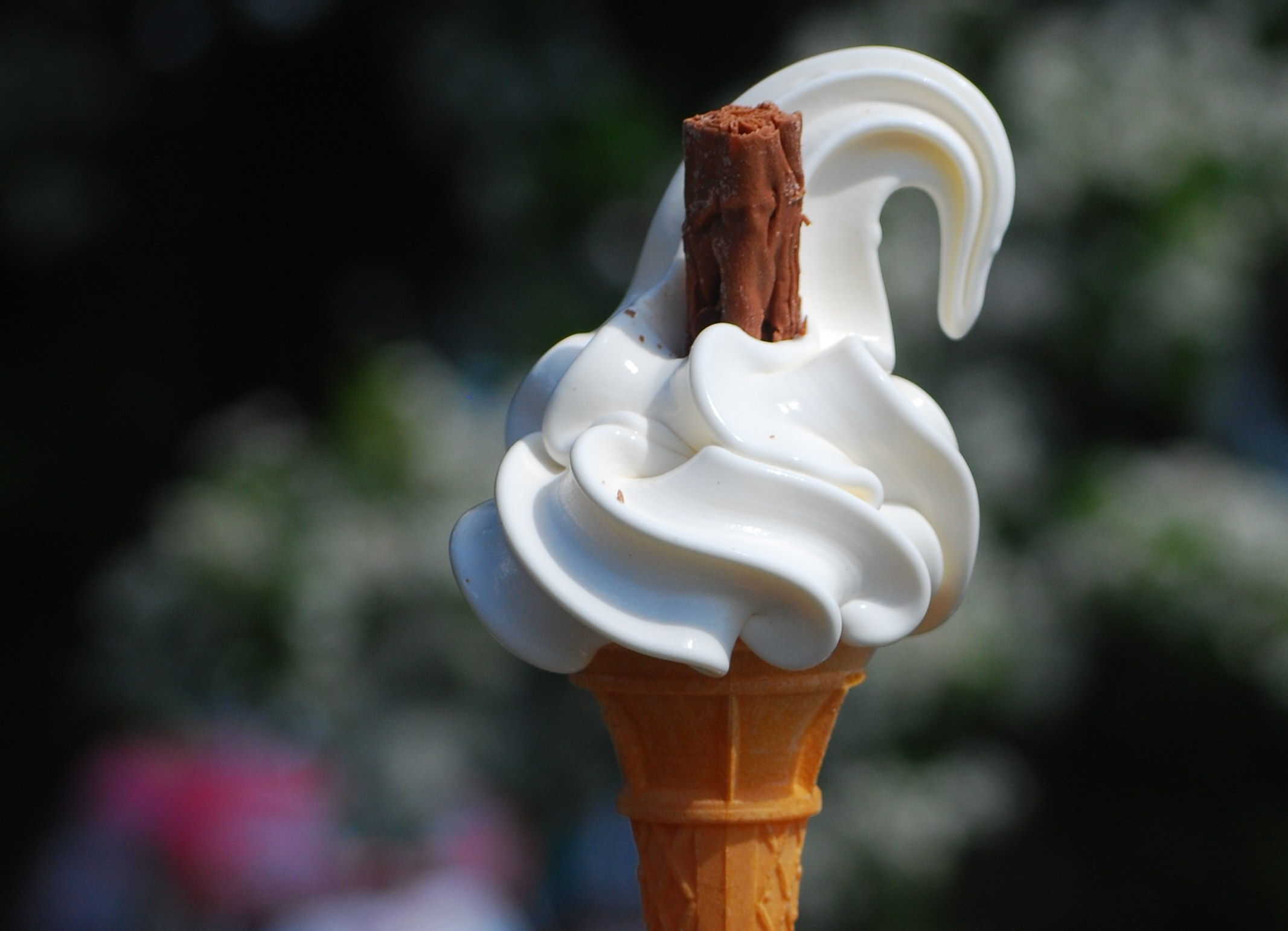
A 99 Flake ice cream cone

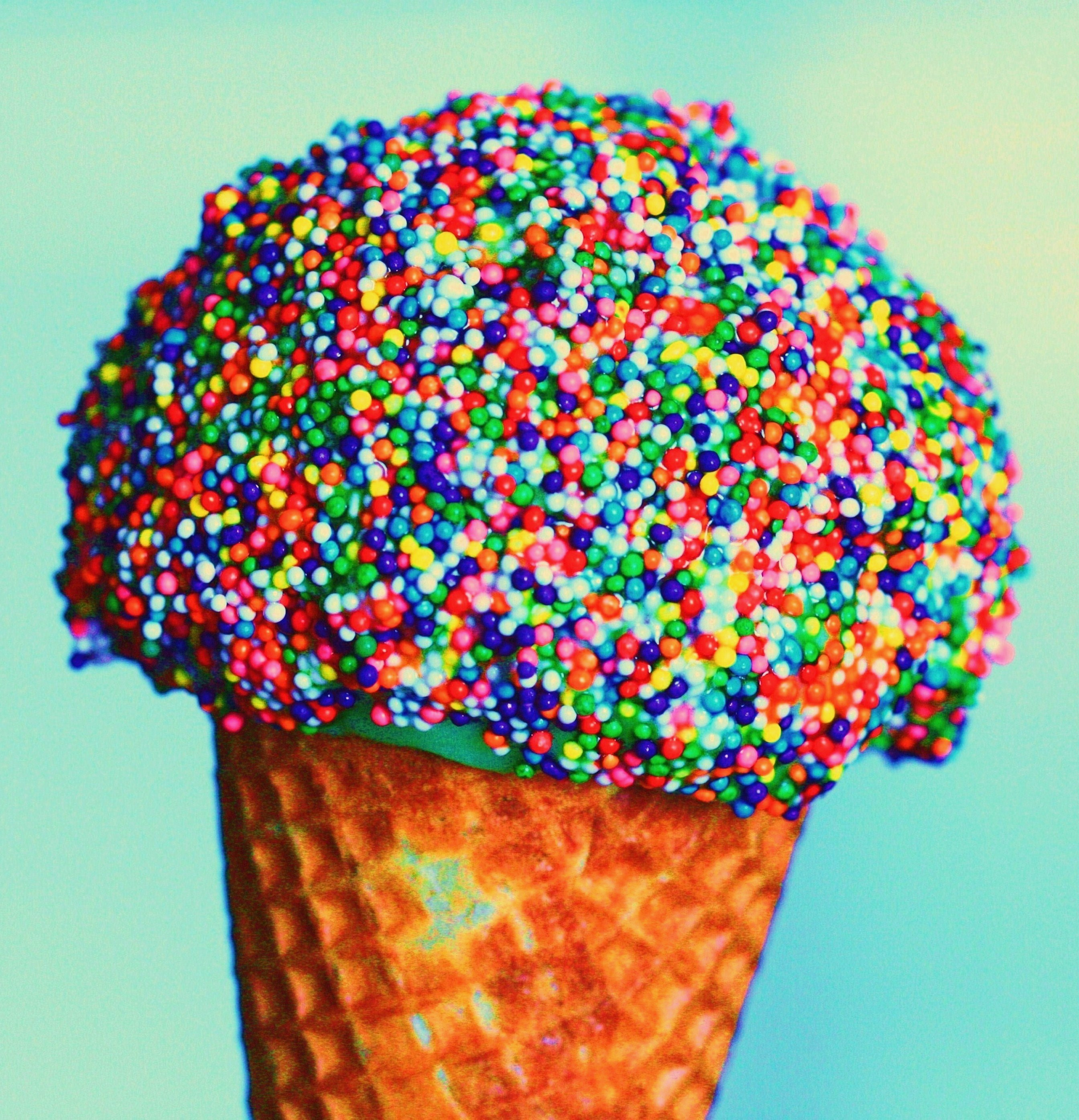
Sugar cone dipped in rainbow sprinkles

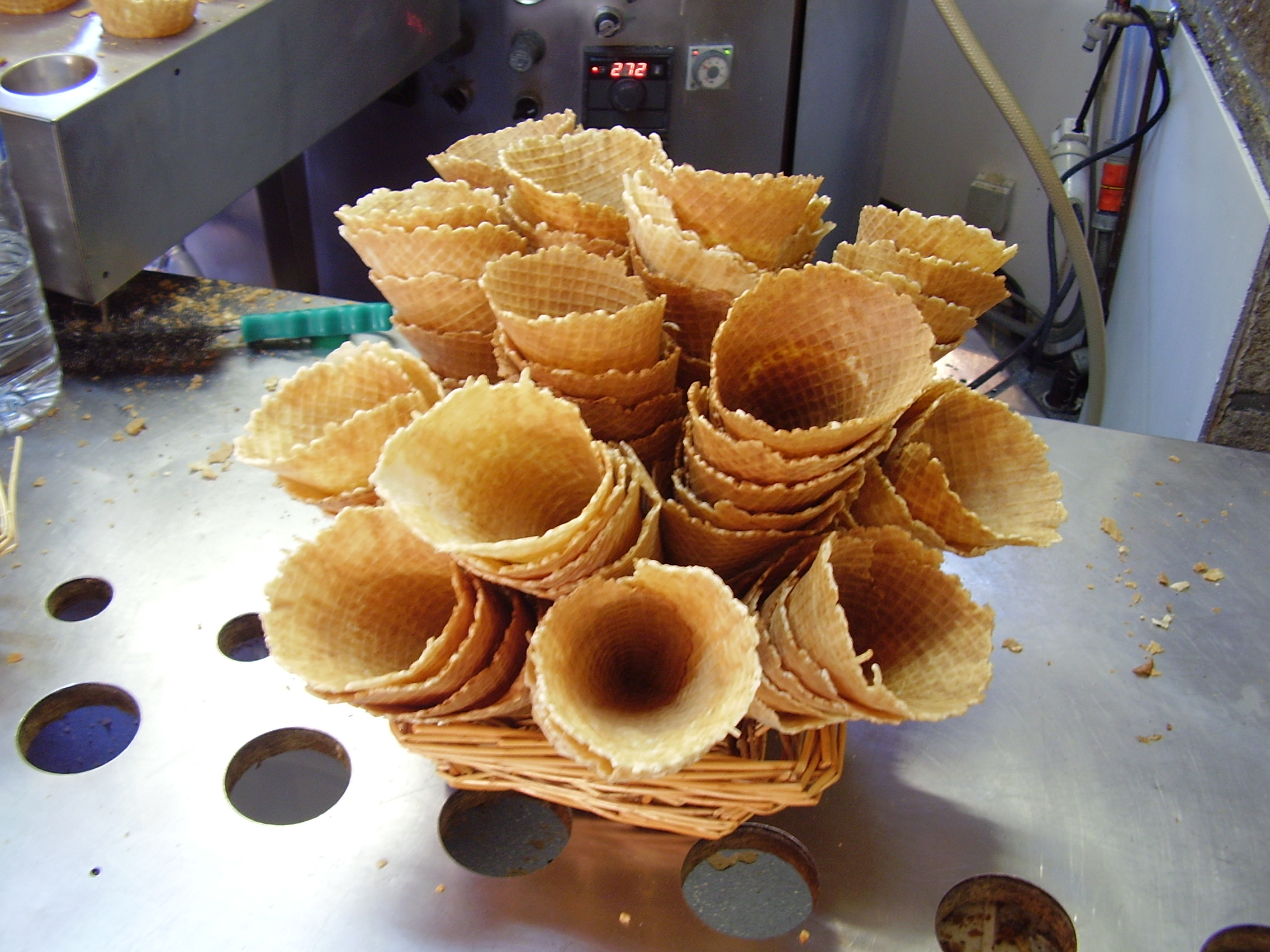
Waffle cones

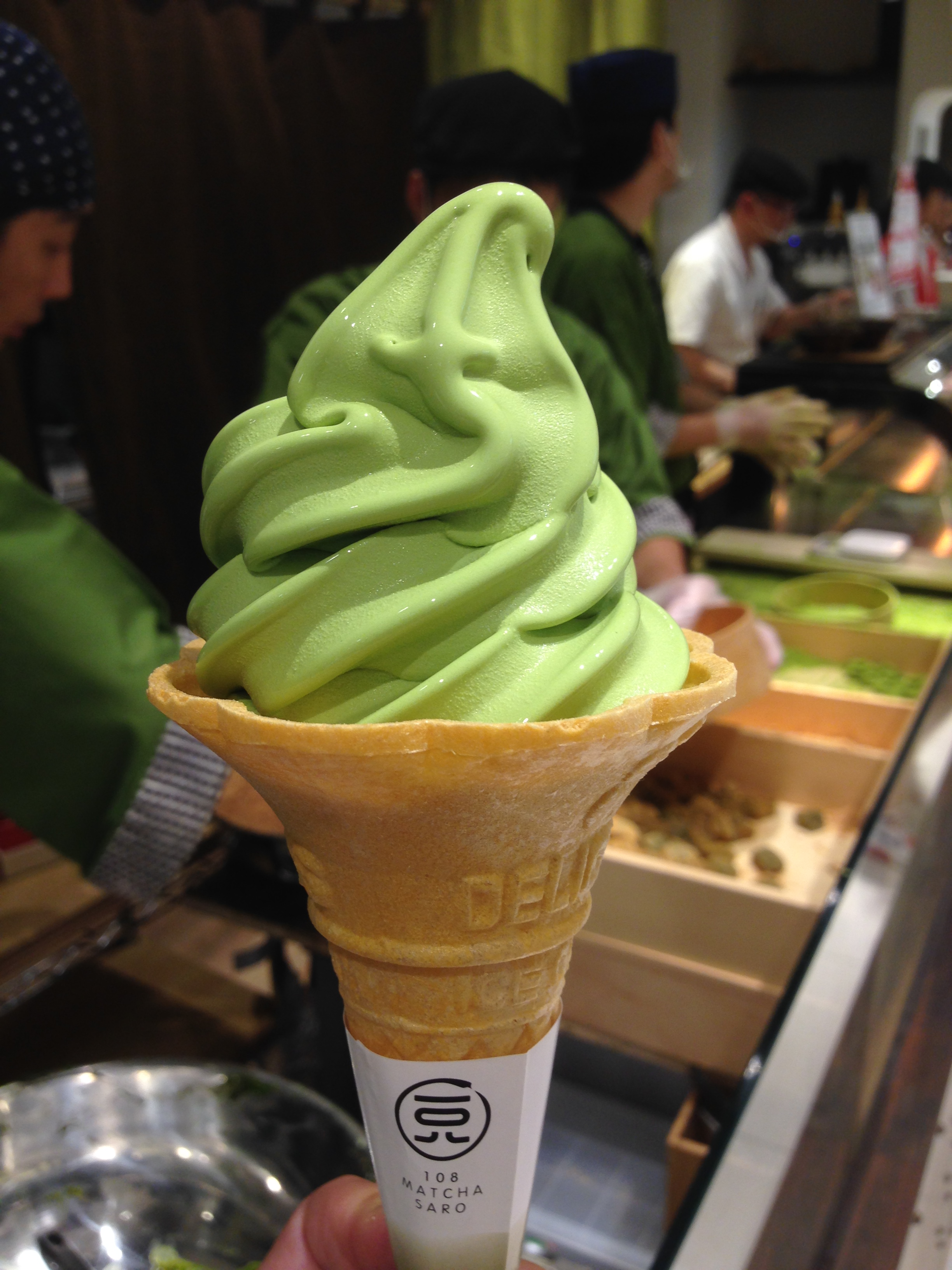
A green tea ice cream cone

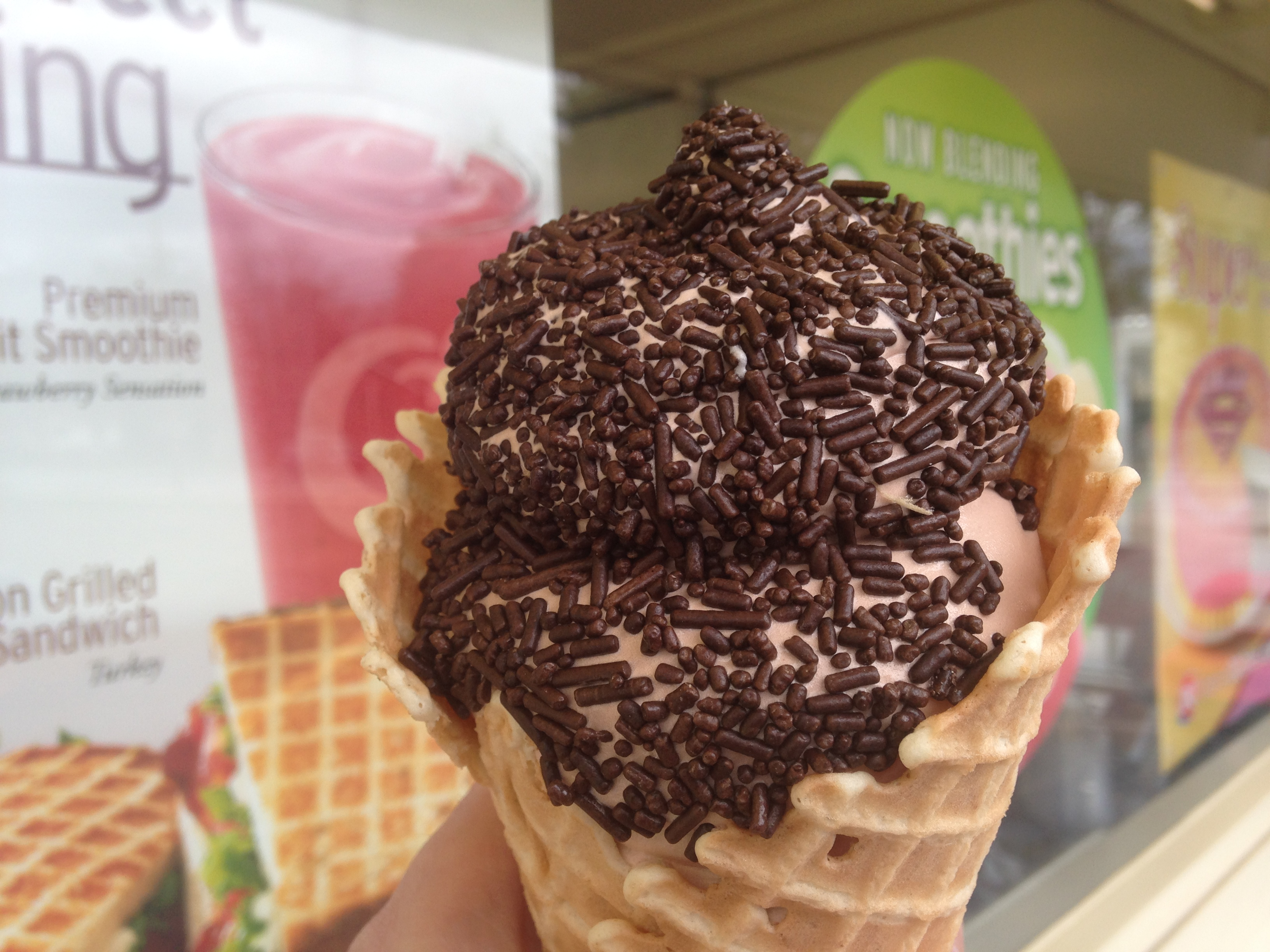
Chocolate soft-serve ice cream with sprinkles in a waffle cone from Dairy Queen

== See also ==
- Drumstick
- Handwich
- Krumkake
- Penny lick
