= Bread bowl =

Hollowed out bread loaf made to contain other food

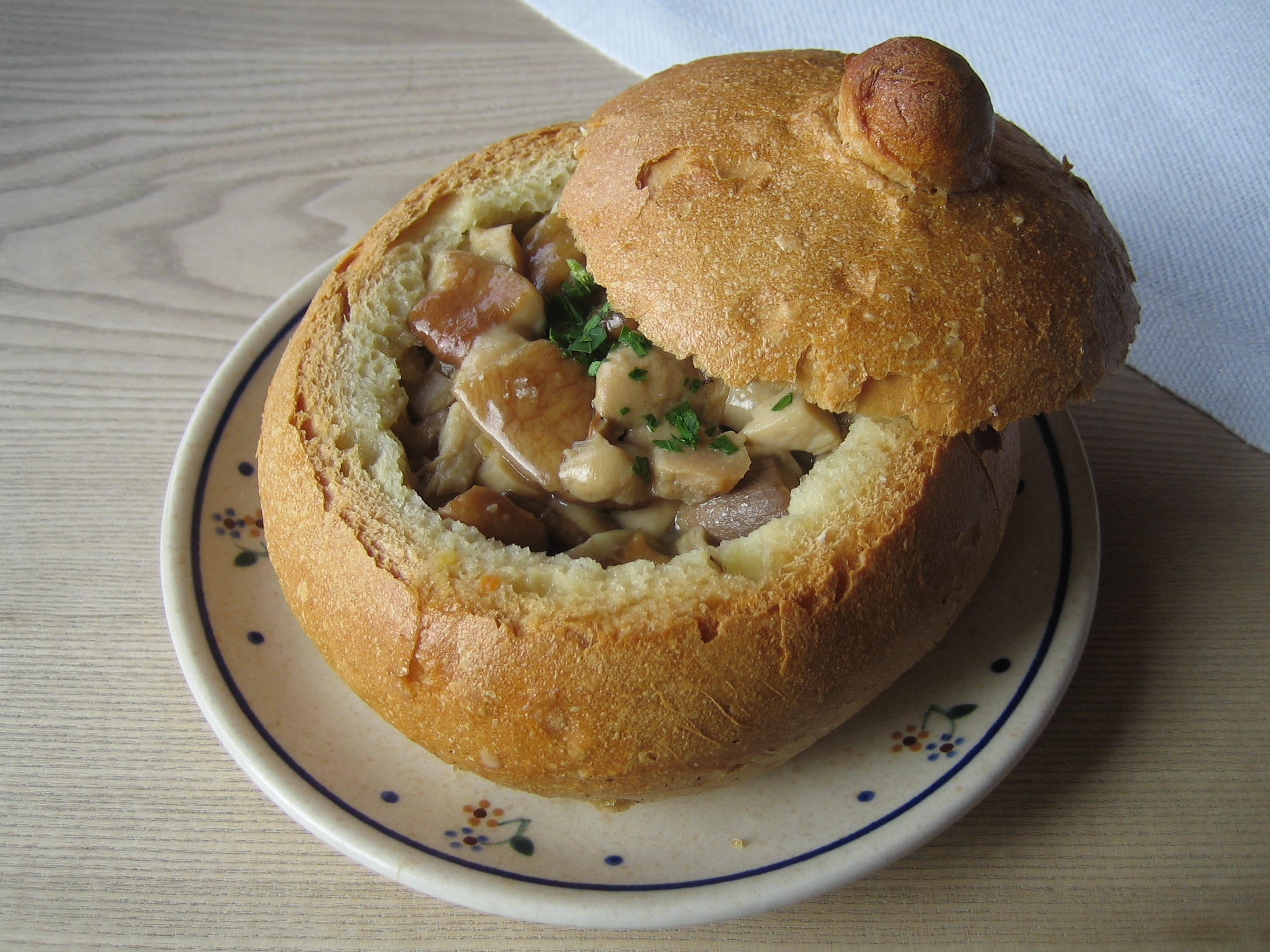
- A porcini mushroom (darker elements) and noodle soup served in a bread bowl
- Type: Bread
- Main ingredients: Bread

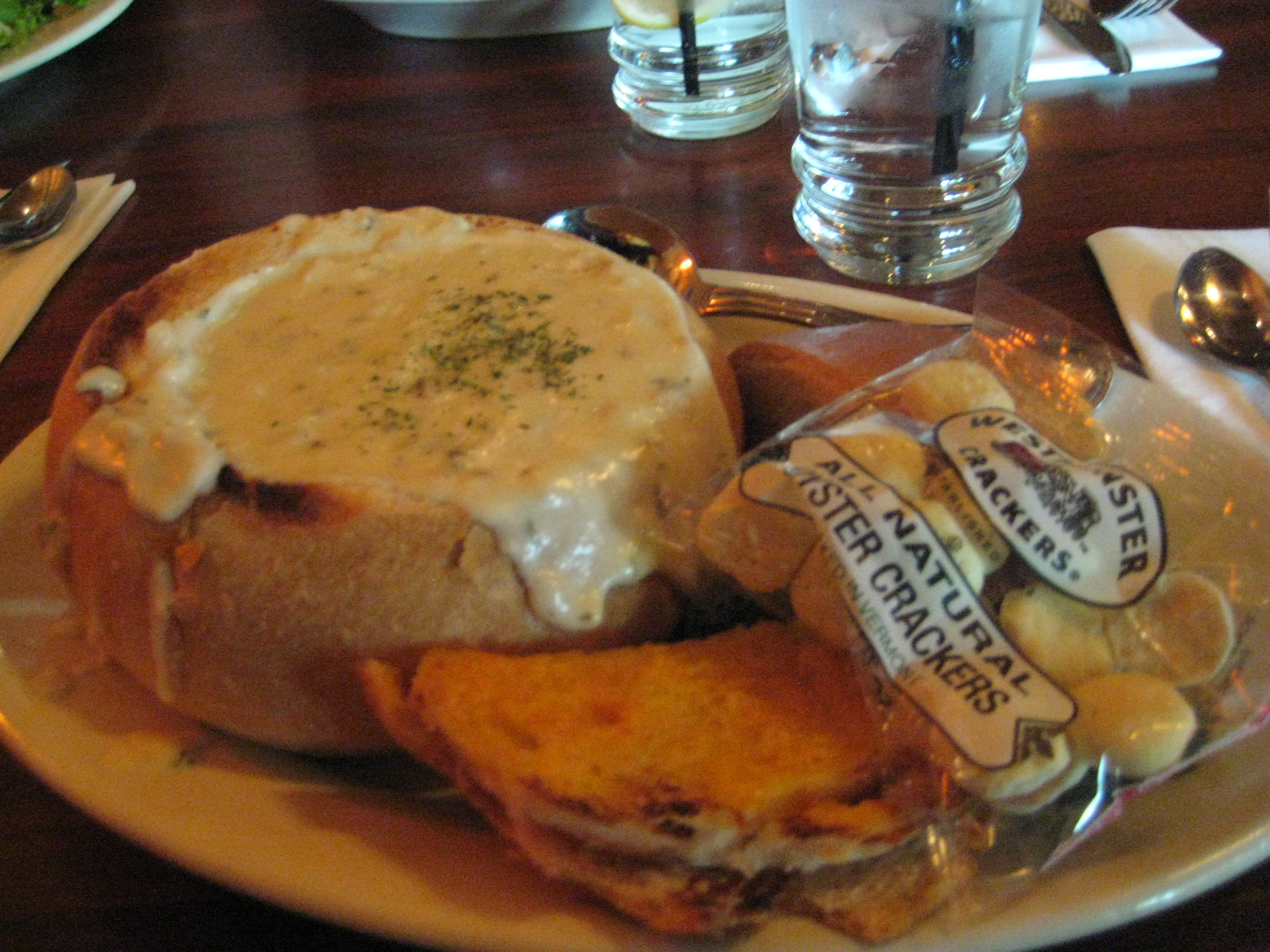
A clam chowder served in a bread bowl (left)

A bread bowl is a round loaf of bread which has had the top cut off and a large portion of the middle hollowed out to create an edible bowl. They are often made out of sourdough bread or pumpernickel. They are typically larger than a roll but smaller than a full-sized loaf of bread.

Bread bowls can be used to serve chili, New England–style clam chowder, and other thick soups and stews (often, but not always, with a cheese or cream base). Soups with thinner bases are not generally served in bread bowls, as the broth would make the bread get too soggy too quickly. The bread becomes flavored as it absorbs some of the stew's base, and can be eaten after the stew has been eaten. Bread bowls are also used for dips, using the scooped-out bread for dipping.

== Variations ==
Spinach dip in a bread bowl originated as a promotional appetizer for supermarkets ahead of the 1985 Super Bowl.

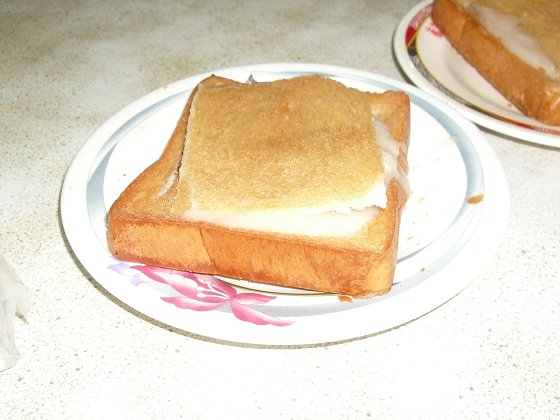
Coffin Lid (棺材板)

"Coffin lid" or "coffin bread" (Chinese: 棺材板; pinyin: guāncáibǎn; Pe̍h-ōe-jī: koaⁿ-chhâ-pán) is a Taiwanese variant developed in Tainan in the 1940s. It uses thick white bread that is deep fried to a crisp. A layer of crust is then cut away to expose the inside, which is then dug out, allowing stews to be placed in. The crust layer is then replaced on top of the stew.

== See also ==
- Bunny chow
- Egg in the basket
- Handwich
- List of bread dishes
- Milk toast
- Sop
- Trencher (tableware)
