= Nara Dreamland =

Former theme park in Nara, Japan

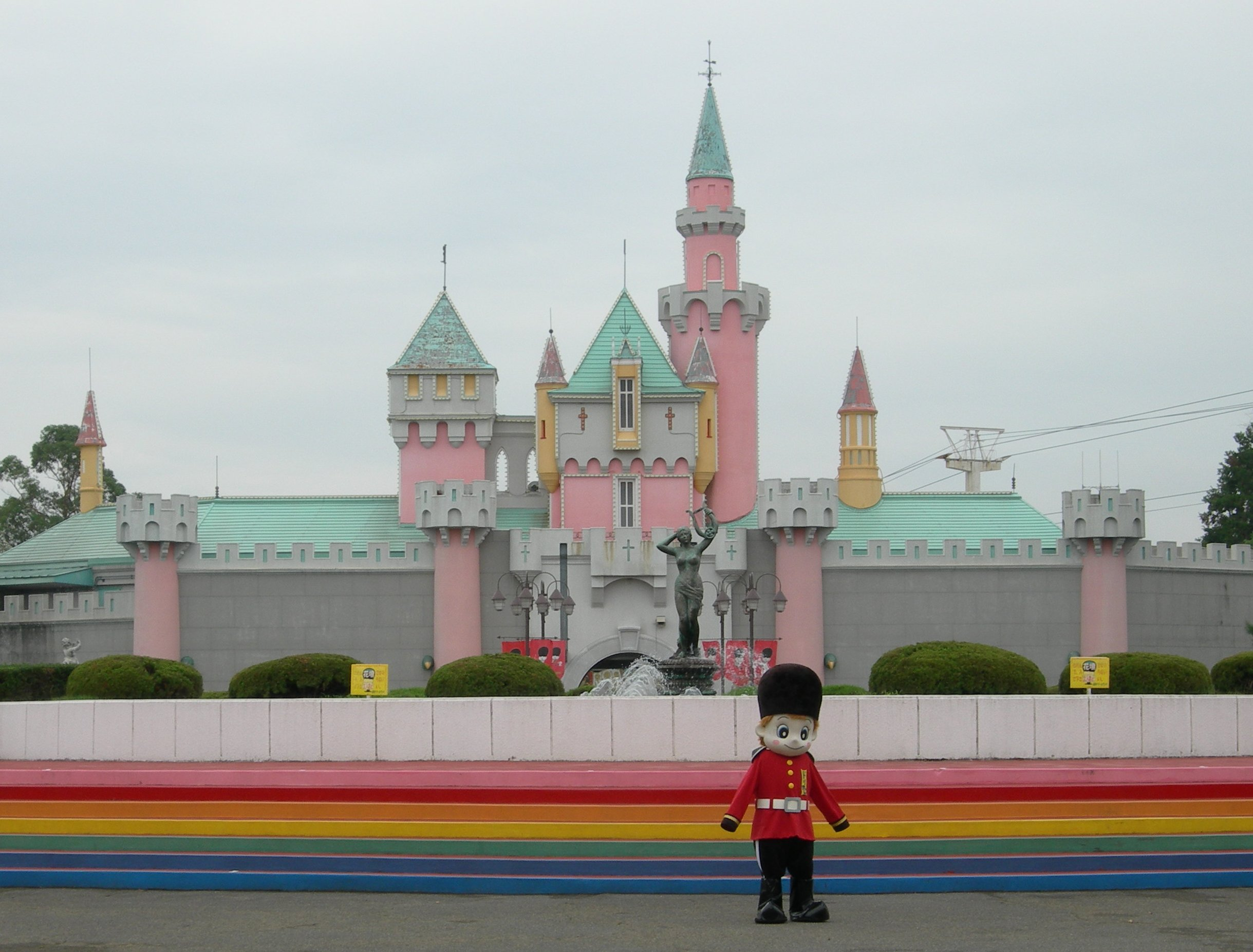
- Dori-chan, one of the park's mascots, standing near the castle, modeled after Sleeping Beauty Castle, at Nara Dreamland, less than a year before the park’s closure
- Interactive map of Nara Dreamland
- Location: 2 Chōme-1 Hōrensahoyama-chō, Nara, Nara Prefecture, Japan
- Coordinates: 34.699444°N 135.8225°E
- Status: Defunct
- Opened: July 1, 1961
- Closed: August 31, 2006
- Owner: Daiei (former Nippon Dream Kanko)
- Operated by: Dreampark
- General manager: Kunizo Matsuo

Attractions
- Roller coasters: 6
- Water rides: 1

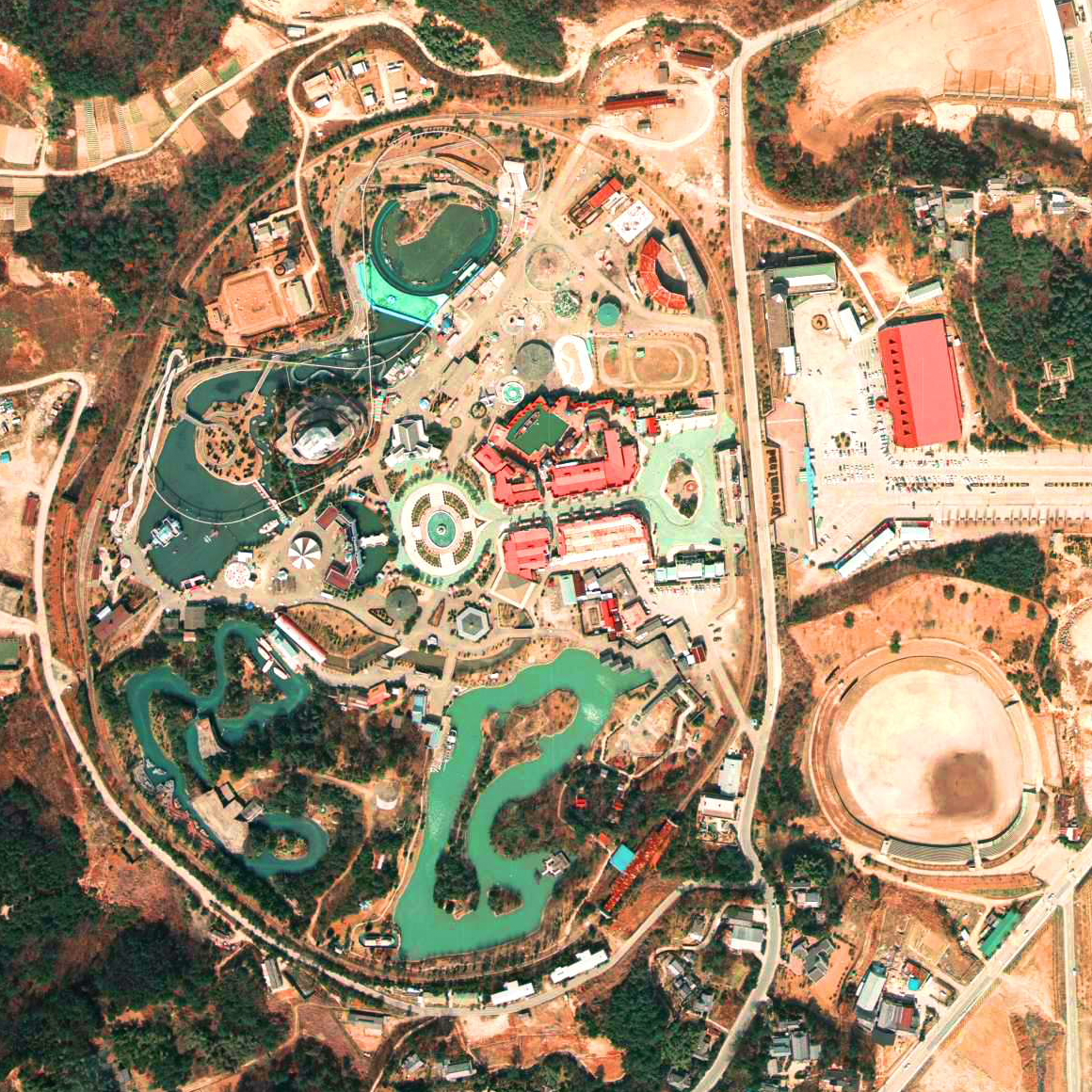
Nara Dreamland in 1975. Ancestorland was still there.

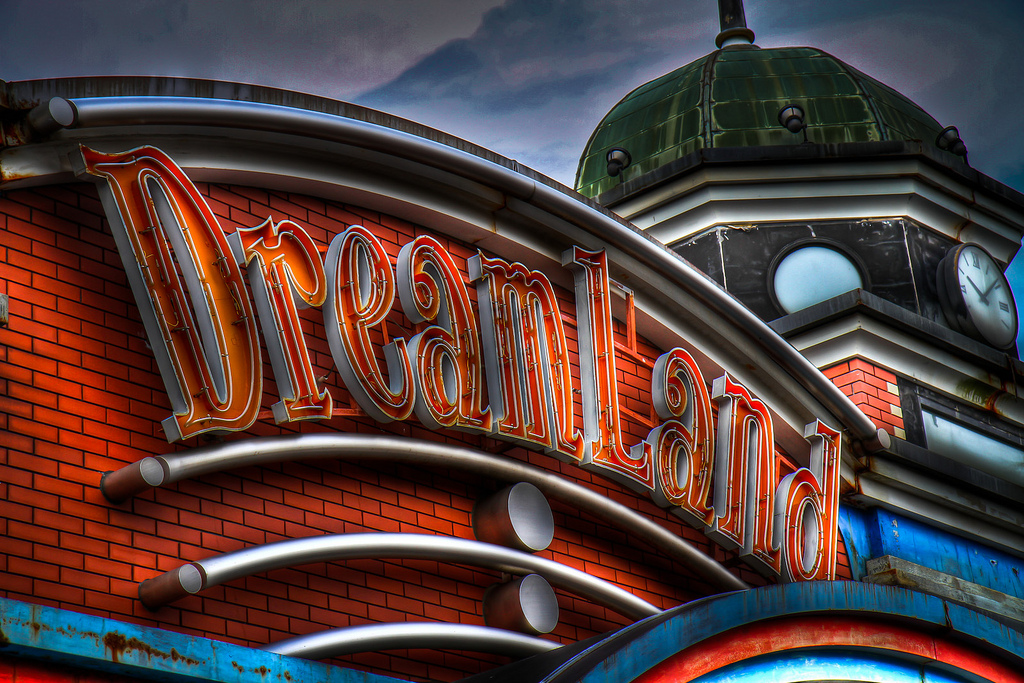
Entrance to the main street, 2012

Nara Dreamland (Japanese: 奈良ドリームランド, Hepburn: Nara Dorīmurando), or just simply Dreamland, was a theme park near Nara, Japan, heavily inspired by Disneyland in California. It opened in 1961 and was successful until the opening of Tokyo Disneyland in 1983 which caused attendance to drop. Attendance fell even further after both Tokyo DisneySea and Universal Studios Japan opened in 2001, leading to Dreamland's permanent closure in 2006. The park was left abandoned until it was demolished between October 2016 and December 2017.

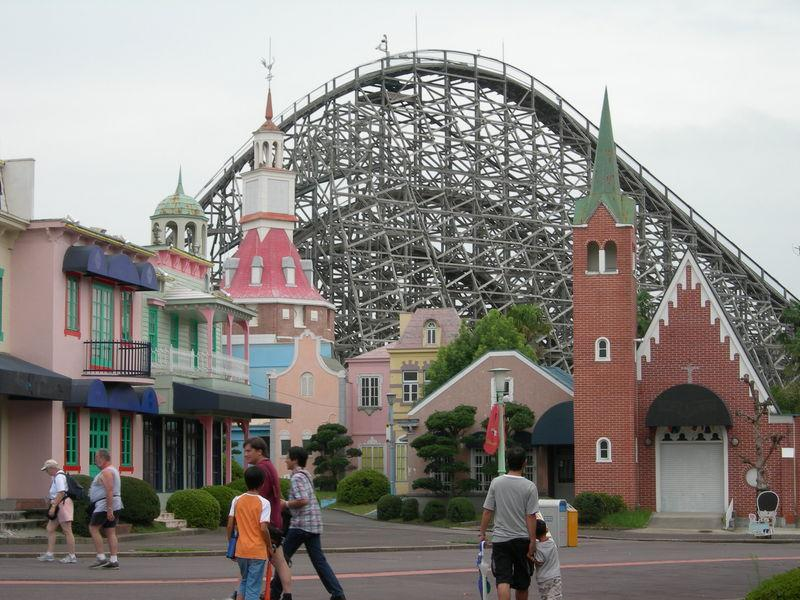
Nara Dreamland in September 2005, less than a year before its closure

== History ==
=== Beginnings ===
When Disneyland opened in Anaheim in 1955, Japanese businessman Kunizo Matsuo visited the park, and was so impressed with what Walt Disney made, that he envisioned an amusement park like it to be perfect in Japan. He then got into talks with Walt to franchise a Disney park in Japan, and it seemed well, as Disney then supposedly had Imagineers create concepts for the park, but the deal fell through, most likely due to problems involving licensing agreements. Still wanting to open a Disney-like park, Matsuo decided to move forward with the plans, whilst removing any Disney intellectual properties.

On July 1, 1961, Nara Dreamland was opened to the public. The park was designed to look almost identical to Disneyland, including its own Main Street, U.S.A., Sleeping Beauty Castle, and Ancestorland, the park's version of Frontierland, which featured Japanese history. In addition, the park had a Matterhorn-like mountain containing a Matterhorn Bobsleds–type ride, called Bobsleigh, with a Skyway running through it, as well as an Autopia-type ride and a monorail.

The park also had its own mascots, Ran-chan and Dori-chan, two children dressed as bearskin guards who also appeared in magic shows and parades, as well as some anthropomorphic animals (additionally full-replica versions of some of these costumes can be found on selling sites). Both Ran-chan and Dori-chan's respective costumes used in the park alongside a few other merchandise were given away to a collector sometime after the park closed, whereas most of the rest were left to rot. In one of the park's areas, there was a storage room containing mascot animal heads (possibly intended to be for the park's characters) which were never used.

The park was initially popular, especially for Japanese citizens, due to its similarities to Disneyland, which did not have a theme park in Japan at the time. At its peak, the park had more than 1,600,000 visitors a year.

=== Decline ===
In 1979, The Oriental Land Company made contact with The Walt Disney Company to create a Disney theme park in Tokyo. After a few years of construction, Tokyo Disneyland opened to the public on April 15, 1983.

Not long after, Nara Dreamland's number of visitors slowly began to decrease, as more people became interested in going to Tokyo Disneyland due to the latter having bigger park size, more rides, newer amenities, and better reputation compared to the former. This marked the beginning of the downfall for Dreamland, with attendance numbers dropping to around 1,000,000 visitors a year. MEC, including Nara Dreamland, was bought by the supermarket chain Daiei in 1993.

On March 31, 2001, another theme park called Universal Studios Japan opened in Osaka, which is about 40 kilometers (24.85 miles) away from Nara Dreamland. Several months later, Tokyo DisneySea opened next to Tokyo Disneyland on September 4, 2001. Both parks were shown to gain more popularity compared to Nara Dreamland. As a result, Dreamland's attendance numbers continued to decrease, plummeting to only 400,000 visitors a year.

By the early 2000s, the park had declined in quality; most stores and restaurants closed down, attractions began to rust, and service trucks were left around the park with no one using them.

On August 31, 2006, Nara Dreamland permanently closed after 45 years of service. According to YouTube series Defunctland, on the park's last day, there was an event celebrating the park before its closure, although very few people attended. Nara Dreamland was left abandoned for 10 years before the start of its demolition in October 2016.

== Sale and demolition ==
Nara City's government gained ownership of the park after the park's owner fell behind in property taxes. In 2013, the city put the site up for auction but the auction received no bids. In 2015 the city put the property up for auction again. This time, an Osaka-based real estate company named SK Housing won the bid, paying ¥730,000,000 (or $6,000,000 in USD).

In October 2016, a Japanese newspaper reported that SK Housing had started the demolition process.

== Attractions ==
The park contained several rides prior to its closure in 2006, including:

- Aska: manufactured by Intamin, this was a wooden roller coaster based on The Cyclone at Coney Island
- Screw Coaster, a double-corkscrew steel roller coaster designed by Arrow Development
- Bobsleigh, a steel roller coaster modeled after the Matterhorn Bobsleds
- Space Liner, a monorail that ran through Fantasyland and Tomorrowland
- Gallantry, a shooting dark ride
- Fantasy Coaster
- Kid's Coaster
- A Coaster From Darkness
- Go Kart Racing

Other rides included a carousel, a Mad Tea Party–styled ride, a haunted maze, a small powered coaster, a Jungle Cruise-styled ride, and a log flume.

== Popularity with urban explorers ==
After its closure and before its demolition (between September 2006 and September 2016), Nara Dreamland was a popular destination for haikyoists, or urban explorers. Some people who visited the abandoned park left graffiti on some of the park's walls and attractions, such as the monorail. Others even took some of the park's character statues and placed them on broken attractions in sinister positions. Additionally, many have reported hearing strange noises near the park's boats. Some speculate that it may have been caused by a running water pump or a type of bull frog.

== See also ==
- Yokohama Dreamland
- Wonderland Amusement Park (Beijing)

== Sources ==
- Dreamland at Theme Park Review
- Dreamland at JCOM
- Dreamland at LaughingPlace
- at Japan Property Central
- at Matsuo Performing Arts Foundation
- at The Foundation Matsuo Scholarship Society
- at Nara Dreamland's official website on the Internet Archive's Wayback Machine.
