= Coffin bread =

Taiwanese bowl-shaped bread

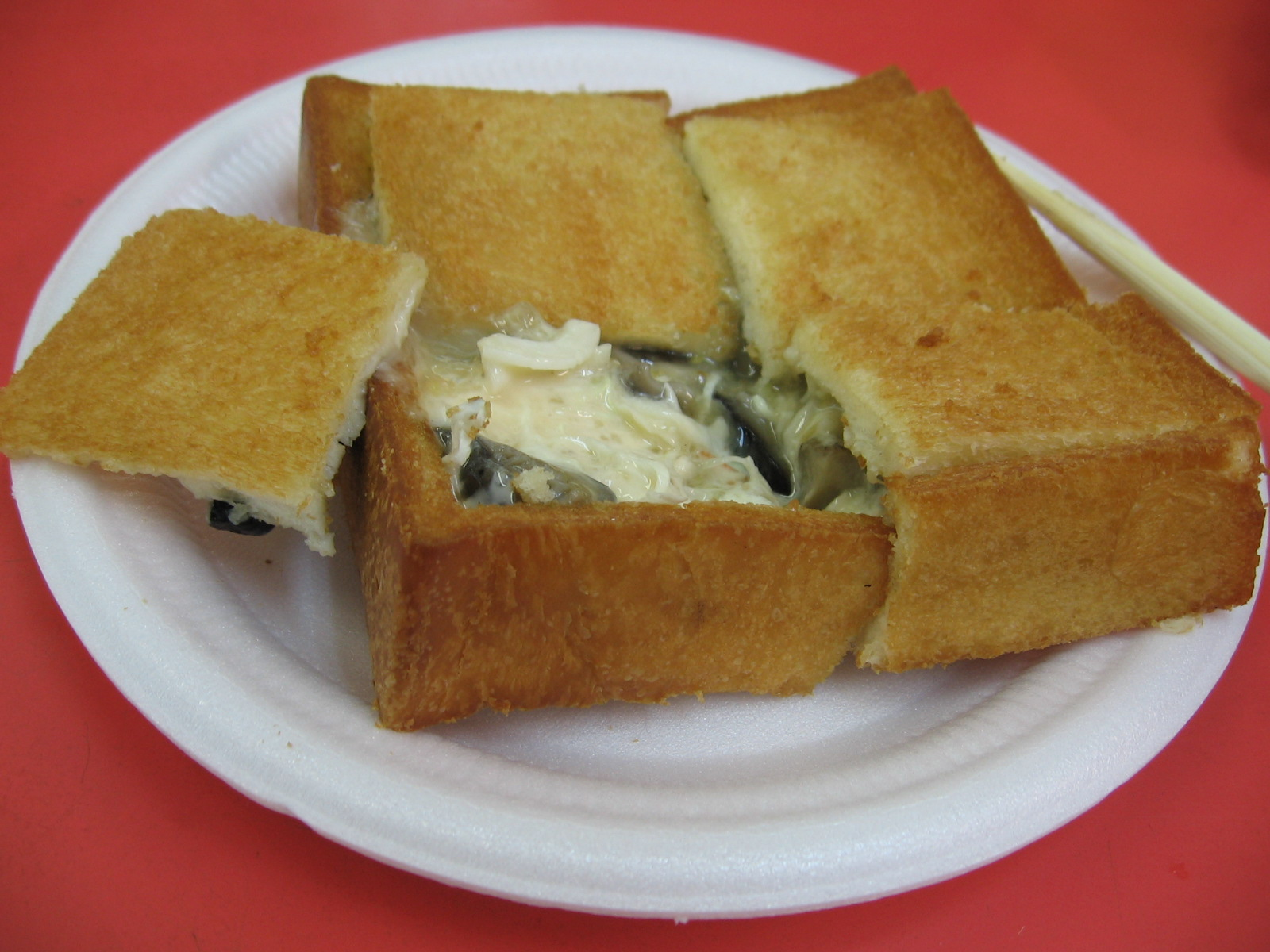
Coffin Bread

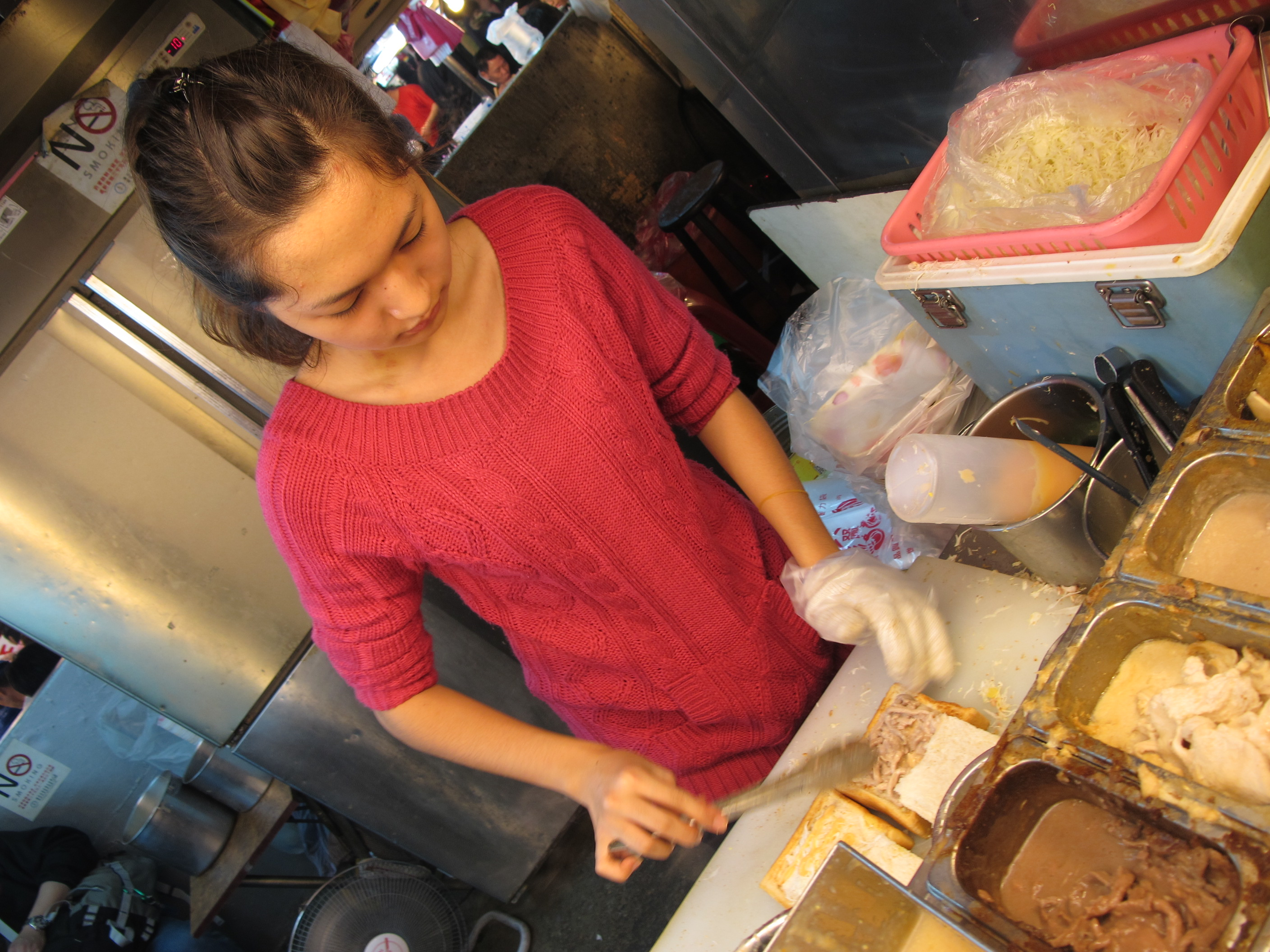
Street vendor making Coffin Bread at Shilin Night Market in Taiwan

Coffin bread, also known as coffin lid or coffin board (Taiwanese Hokkien: koaⁿ-chhâ-pang 棺柴枋, Chinese: 棺材板; pinyin: guāncaibǎn), is a Taiwanese bread bowl which originated in Tainan.

== History ==
Coffin bread has been sold at night markets in Tainan and Taipei since at least the 1940s. It became popular with US troops stationed in Taiwan. Sources credit the invention of coffin bread to Hsu Liu-yi, owner of Shengchang Old Chikan (Chikan Coffin), a restaurant in Kangle Market since 1942.

== Description ==
Coffin bread starts as a thick slab of soft white bread. The bread is hollowed out and deep fried or toasted before it is filled with a creamy stew of chicken, seafood, tripe, or mushroom. It is then topped with a piece of toasted or fried bread, creating the "coffin" look.

== See also ==
- Taiwanese cuisine
- Bunny chow
