= Defunctland =

YouTube web series about discontinued amusement parks

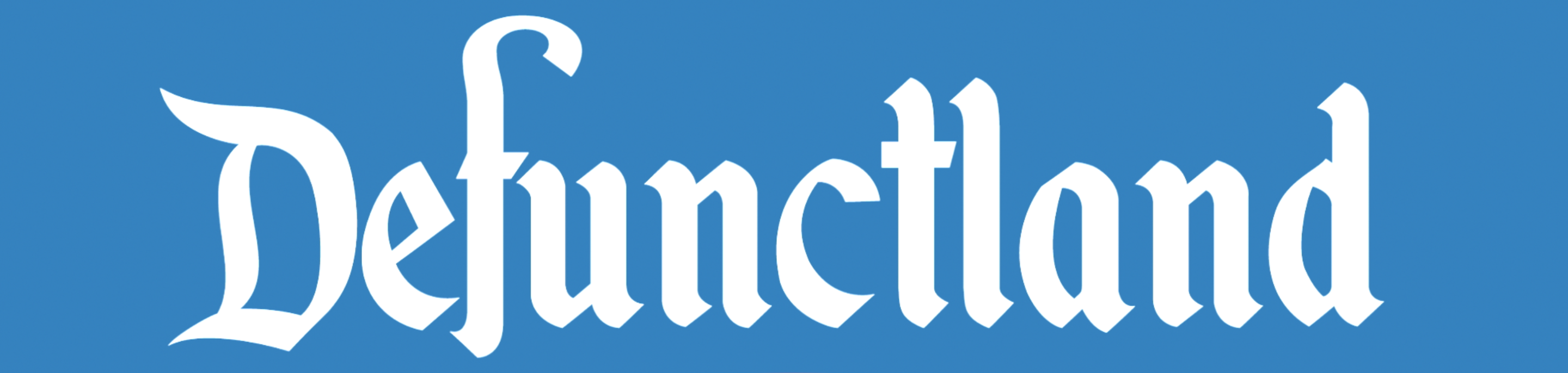
- Genre: History
- Created by: Kevin Perjurer
- Presented by: Kevin Perjurer
- Country of origin: United States
- Original language: English
- No. of seasons: 3
- No. of episodes: 56

Production
- Executive producers: Eric Ahlstrom; Ricardo Andres Ponce; John Lagerholm; Sam Nevens; Casey Wood; Brandon Grikas; Michael J Dickhaut; Chris Putnam; Topher Proctor; Nicole Gunara; Scott Alsvig; Danny Perkins; Nate Begle; Allie Williams
- Running time: 12–258 minutes

Original release
- Network: YouTube
- Release: February 15, 2017 – present

Defunctland is a video documentary series about the history of discontinued amusement parks and amusement park attractions, created and hosted by Kevin Perjurer and published on YouTube. The show presents the history and downfall of theme parks and attractions from around the world, most notably those of Disney, Universal, and Six Flags.

The channel has amassed over 2 million subscribers as of June 2025. The success of Defunctland led to two spin-offs: Debunkedland and DefunctTV, both of which premiered in 2018. In 2024, the Defunctland series was nominated for a Peabody Award in the "Interactive & Immersive" category.

== VR park ==
Initially, the Defunctland YouTube series was meant to be a showcase for attractions that would be a part of a virtual theme park of the same name. Soon after starting the channel in 2017, Perjurer uploaded a video titled "Defunctland VR: The Sorcerer's Hat" to show off the initial prototype of the park. While volunteers with knowledge of virtual reality environments did sign up, progress has been considered relatively slow.

About a year later, Perjurer made a post on his website about the VR Park to explain that it was still happening, as well as show off some of the progress up to that point. A video was uploaded in January 2021, showing a virtual reality recreation of Disney's 20,000 Leagues Under the Sea: Submarine Voyage, as well as other parts of the park.

== Episodes ==
=== Series overview ===
Series	Season	Episodes	Originally released	
Series	Season	Episodes	First released	Last released
Defunctland	1	22	February 15, 2017	January 22, 2018
Defunctland	2	21	February 5, 2018	March 22, 2019
Defunctland	3	Ongoing	October 5, 2019	TBA
Defunctland	Minisodes	12	December 18, 2017	TBA
Debunkedland	1	2	April 9, 2018	April 26, 2018
Debunkedland	2	1	October 24, 2019	
DefunctTV	1	19	July 12, 2018	February 28, 2022
DefunctTV	Jim Henson	6	April 16, 2019	July 14, 2019

=== Season 1 (2017) ===
The first season of Defunctland, created by Kevin Perjurer, premiered on the YouTube channel of the same name on February 15, 2017, and lasted for 22 episodes. Initially, each episode ended with Perjurer polling the viewers on where the attraction should go in the VR Park, however, this was phased out by the end of the season. Perjurer originally pitched his voice lower during his narrations, which was also dropped before the end of the season. During this season, Perjurer portrayed himself using images of wax figurines of American actor, Brad Pitt. The season finale premiered on December 11, 2017.

No. overall	No. in season	Title	Location(s)	Original release date
1	1	"The History of ExtraTERRORestrial: Alien Encounter"	Magic Kingdom	February 15, 2017
2	2	"The History of Disneyland's Videopolis"	Disneyland Park	February 22, 2017; February 1, 2020 (Remastered)
3	3	"The History of Jaws: The Ride"	Universal Studios Florida; Universal Studios Japan	March 2, 2017
4	4	"The History of The Sorcerer's Hat"	Disney's Hollywood Studios	March 9, 2017
5	5	"The History of Pretzel Dark Rides"	Across U.S.	March 17, 2017
6	6	"The History of Pleasure Island"	Disney Springs	Part 1: April 3, 2017; Part 2: April 20, 2017
7	7	"The History of Kongfrontation"	Universal Studios Florida	May 4, 2017
8	8	"The History of Disney's Superstar Limo" / "The History of Disney's Worst Attraction Ever, Superstar Limo"	Disney California Adventure	May 27, 2017; April 19, 2018 (Remastered)
9	9	"The History of Back to the Future: The Ride"	Universal Studios Florida; Universal Studios Hollywood; Universal Studios Japan	June 9, 2017
10	10	"The History of 20,000 Leagues Under the Sea: Submarine Voyage"	Disneyland; Magic Kingdom	Part 1: June 23, 2017; Part 2: July 2, 2017
11	11	"The History of Disneyland's America Sings"	Disneyland	July 4, 2017
12	12	"The History of Ghostbusters Spooktacular"	Universal Studios Florida	July 13, 2017
13	13	"The History of Son of Beast"	Kings Island	July 23, 2017
14	14	"The History of Epcot's Body Wars"	Epcot	August 7, 2017
15	15	"The History of Earthquake: The Big One and Disaster!"	Universal Studios Florida	August 21, 2017
16	16	"The History of Cedar Point's Disaster Transport"	Cedar Point	September 4, 2017
17	17	"The History of Captain EO"	Epcot; Disneyland; Tokyo Disneyland; Disneyland Paris	September 25, 2017
18	18	"The History of Action Park"	Action Park, Vernon, New Jersey	October 16, 2017
19	19	"The History of Beetlejuice's Graveyard Revue"	Universal Studios Florida	October 31, 2017
20	20	"Top 5 Extinct Disney Walk-Around Characters"	N/A	November 13, 2017
21	21	"The History of Drachen Fire at Busch Gardens Williamsburg"	Busch Gardens Williamsburg	November 27, 2017
22	22	"The History of The Funtastic World of Hanna-Barbera"	Universal Studios Florida	December 11, 2017

=== Season 2 (2018–19) ===
The second season of Defunctland premiered on February 5, 2018. A common theme throughout the season was the rise and fall of Michael Eisner and his effects on the Disney Parks and The Walt Disney Company as a whole. This season ended on March 22, 2019. The 11th and 12th production blocks were used to produce a double-length episode on the failure of Disney's America, while an additional 23rd production block was used to remake the Season 1 episode on Disney California Adventure's Superstar Limo.

The production value of each episode increased dramatically in the second season, with episodes extending in length and utilizing custom graphics fit to the theme of the episode. Some episodes even include customized theme songs or music. Perjurer stated that the cost of each episode averages around $1,000, with some being as expensive as $2,000.

No. overall	No. in season	Title	Location(s)	Original release date
23	1	"The History of Tomb Raider: The Ride"	Kings Island	February 5, 2018
24	2	"The History of Alton Towers' Black Hole"	Alton Towers	February 19, 2018
25	3	"The History of Journey Into Imagination"	Epcot	March 5, 2018
26	4	"The History of Alfred Hitchcock: The Art of Making Movies"	Universal Studios Florida	March 19, 2018
27	5	"The History of Nara Dreamland"	Nara, Japan	April 2, 2018
28	6	"The Failure of Euro Disneyland"	Disneyland Paris	May 8, 2018
29	7	"The History of Disney's Best Coaster, Space Mountain: From the Earth to the Moon"	Disneyland Paris	May 13, 2018
30	8	"The History of Busch Gardens' Swinging Classic, the Big Bad Wolf"	Busch Gardens Williamsburg	May 21, 2018
31	9	"The Demolition of Six Flags AstroWorld"	Six Flags AstroWorld	May 31, 2018
32	10	"Top 10 Forgotten Disneyland Attractions"	Disneyland	June 21, 2018
33	11	"The War for Disney's America"	Haymarket, Virginia	July 4, 2018
34	12	"The History of the Nickelodeon Hotel"	Holiday Inn Resort Orlando Suites – Waterpark	July 31, 2018
35	13	"The Failure of Disney's Chuck E. Cheese Ripoff, Club Disney"	Across U.S.	August 14, 2018
36	14	"The Failure of Disney's Arcade Chain, DisneyQuest"	Walt Disney World Resort; Chicago, Illinois	September 4, 2018
37	15	"The History of Worlds of Fun's Destroyed Classic, The Orient Express"	Worlds of Fun	October 4, 2018
38	16	"The History of Disney's Scariest Attraction, Cinderella Castle Mystery Tour"	Tokyo Disneyland	October 25, 2018
39	17	"The Mystery of the Abandoned Santa Claus Theme Parks"	Across U.S. Brazil; Arctic Circle	December 23, 2018
40	18	"The Demise of Australia's Biggest Theme Park, Wonderland Sydney"	Sydney, Australia	January 15, 2019
41	19	"The Downfall of Disney's Official Airline, Eastern Airlines"	N/A	February 5, 2019
42	20	"The History of the Terrifying Splash Mountain Predecessor, Tales of the Okefenokee"	Six Flags Over Georgia	March 7, 2019
43	21	"The Failure of Hong Kong Disneyland"	Hong Kong Disneyland	March 22, 2019

=== Season 3 (2019–present) ===
The third season of Defunctland premiered on October 5, 2019. It will last for 22 episodes, of which 13 have been released so far. It has an overarching theme of revisionism and futurism, as well as hinting at the future influence that Walt Disney would receive when he eventually decided to build Disneyland. An additional 23rd production block was used to remake the Season 1 episode on Disneyland's Videopolis.

No. overall	No. in season	Title	Location(s)	Original release date
44	1	"A Roundabout History of the Ferris Wheel"	Chicago, Illinois	October 5, 2019
45	2	"Walt Disney's Childhood Amusement Park, Electric Park"	Kansas City, Missouri	November 14, 2019
46	3	"The Fair That Changed America"	Century of Progress Fair, Chicago, Illinois	November 21, 2019
47	4	"The Craziest Party Walt Disney Ever Threw"	Lake Norconian Club	January 21, 2020
48	5	"The History of Beverly Park Kiddieland"	Beverly Park Kiddieland	February 26, 2020
49	6	"The History of Mickey Mouse Park"	Walt Disney Studios, Burbank, California	March 22, 2020
50	7	"The History of Tomorrowland 1955"	Disneyland	April 19, 2020
51	8	"The History of Coney Island"	Sea Lion Park; Steeplechase Park; Luna Park; Dreamland	June 13, 2020
52	9	"The History of Freedomland U.S.A."	Freedomland U.S.A.	July 7, 2020
53	10	"The History of the 1964 New York World's Fair"	Flushing Meadows–Corona Park	August 9, 2020
54	11	"Walt Disney's City of the Future, E.P.C.O.T."	Walt Disney World	October 12, 2020
55	12	"The History of Disneyland's Adventure Thru Inner Space"	Disneyland	March 6, 2021
56	13	"Journey to EPCOT Center: A Symphonic History"	Walt Disney World	November 19, 2023

=== Minisodes (2017–present) ===
Between the release of main Defunctland episodes, Perjurer will occasionally release smaller Defunctland "minisodes". These episodes can relate to topics outside of theme parks, such as products, advertising, and events.

No.	Title	Location(s)	Original release date
1	"The History of the Country Bear Christmas Special"	Walt Disney World, Tokyo Disneyland	December 18, 2017
2	"The History of McDonald's Mac Tonight"	Worldwide	December 31, 2017
3	"The History of Disney California Adventure's Demolished Entrance"	Disney's California Adventure	January 15, 2018
4	"Muppetland: The Disneyland Invasion That Almost Happened"	Disneyland	November 20, 2018
5	"Burger Invasion: The History of McDonald's and Disney"	Worldwide	May 29, 2019
6	"The History of Cedar Fair's Berenstain Bear Country"	Cedar Fair	August 1, 2019
7	"The History of the Worst Six Flags Coaster, Green Lantern: First Flight"	Six Flags Magic Mountain	May 2, 2020
8	"The History of Toys "R" Us Times Square"	Times Square	December 21, 2020
9	"The History of the Worst SeaWorld Ride, Submarine Quest"	SeaWorld San Diego	May 11, 2021
10	"The Handwich: Disney's Failed Sandwich of the Future"	Walt Disney World	June 17, 2021
11	"The Bizarre Garfield Dark Ride"	Kennywood	May 19, 2022
12	"The Awful Wiggles Dark Ride"	Dreamworld	May 9, 2023
13	"The American Idol Theme Park Experience"	Disney's Hollywood Studios	February 14, 2024
14	"Kid Cities"	Wannado City; KidZania	June 19, 2024
15	"The Abandoning of Celebration City"	Celebration City	May 24, 2026

== Debunkedland ==
The first Defunctland spin-off, Debunkedland, was created by Kevin Perjurer and Noah Randall. Hosted by Randall, the series focused on debunking various rumors and myths about theme parks and theme park attractions. The initial run of the series, hosted by Randall on the Defunctland YouTube channel, lasted for only two episodes in April 2018. The series was rebooted with a third episode on the Themed Alternative YouTube channel, hosted by the mysterious "K", voiced by Bleaker, written by Corvyn Hartwick and edited by Heath Jinkins. This new incarnation of the series premiered on October 24, 2019.

=== Season 1 (Hosted by Noah Randall) ===
No.	Title	Original release date
1	"The Conspiracies of ExtraTERRORestrial: Alien Encounter"	April 9, 2018
2	"The Controversies of Jaws: The Ride"	April 26, 2018

=== Season 2 (Hosted by "K") ===
No.	Title	Original release date
1	"The Myths of Pirates of the Caribbean"	October 24, 2019

== DefunctTV ==
The second Defunctland spin-off, DefunctTV, premiered on June 12, 2018. It was co-created by Kevin Perjurer and Heath Jinkins, and hosted by Perjurer. The show takes a look at the history of defunct television shows, their inception, and what eventually led to their downfall.

=== Season 1 (2018–present) ===
No.	Title	Original release date
1	"The History of Bear in the Big Blue House"	June 12, 2018
2	"The History of Legends of the Hidden Temple"	July 17, 2018
3	"The History of Zoboomafoo"	September 18, 2018
4	"The History of Between the Lions"	December 13, 2018
5	"The History of the Wubbulous World of Dr. Seuss"	February 19, 2019
6	"The History of Dragon Tales"	August 31, 2019
7	"The History of Welcome to Pooh Corner"	October 18, 2019
8	"The History of the Original Ghost Busters"	October 31, 2019
9	"The History of Gullah Gullah Island"	November 30, 2019
10	"The History of Oobi"	December 22, 2019
11	"The History of Dumbo's Circus"	April 4, 2020
12	"The History of Adventures in Wonderland"	May 10, 2020
13	"The History of Mousercise"	July 14, 2020
14	"The History of the Big Comfy Couch"	November 19, 2020
15	"The History of Buzz Lightyear of Star Command"	February 6, 2021
16	"The History of Where in the World is Carmen Sandiego?"	April 6, 2021
17	"The History of Fetch! with Ruff Ruffman"	May 31, 2021
18	"The History of The Puzzle Place"	August 8, 2021
19	"The History of Under the Umbrella Tree"	February 28, 2022

=== DefunctTV: Jim Henson (2019) ===
A six-episode DefunctTV miniseries on the life and work of Jim Henson premiered on April 16, 2019, and ended on July 14, 2019.

No. overall	No. in season	Title	Original release date
1	1	"The History of the First Muppet Show, Sam and Friends"	April 16, 2019
DefuncTV explores Sam and Friends, the Wilkins Coffee commercials, and the other local Washington, D.C., shows Jim Henson had worked on.
2	2	"The Curse of Sesame Street"	April 30, 2019
DefunctTV explores Sesame Street and The Muppet Show pilots, such as The Muppet Show: Sex and Violence and Hey, Cinderella!.
3	3	"The History of The Muppet Show"	May 15, 2019
DefunctTV explores The Muppet Show and The Muppet Movie.
4	4	"The History of Fraggle Rock"	June 12, 2019
DefunctTV explores Fraggle Rock, The Great Muppet Caper, and The Dark Crystal.
5	5	"The History of Muppet Babies"	June 27, 2019
DefunctTV explores Muppet Babies, The Muppets Take Manhattan, Labyrinth, and The StoryTeller.
6	6	"The Final Jim Henson Hour"	July 14, 2019
DefunctTV explores The Jim Henson Hour, Muppet*Vision 3D, The Muppets Celebrate Jim Henson and Jim Henson's passing.

== Feature-length documentaries ==
On August 20, 2020, Defunctland released Live from the Space Stage: A Halyx Story, a feature-length documentary by Matthew Serrano about Halyx, a space-themed band that performed at Disneyland's Tomorrowland Space Stage in 1981, including interviews with Gary Krisel, Mike Post, Jymn Magon, and members of Halyx. A second feature-length documentary, Disney's FastPass: A Complicated History, was released on November 21, 2021, examining the history of ride ticketing as well as the implementation, development and efficacy of line management systems at Disney parks. A third feature-length documentary, Disney Channel's Theme: A History Mystery, was released on November 20, 2022, chronicling Perjurer's investigation into the then-unknown composer of the iconic Disney Channel jingle. He released his fourth documentary in 2023 that explores the development and history of Disney's Epcot. The Epcot documentary doubled as the 13th episode of Defunctland's third season, and was an experimental documentary, being portrayed through a symphonic piece with a "historical companion" being used to provide context, similar to a live performing of an opera. His next documentary was about the so-called "Kids Cities" theme parks where children simulate the adult world. He ended the year of 2024 with a history documentary about the Disney's Animatronics. In November 2025, the second part of the documentary was published. It is the longest video by Perjurer as of 2025, running at 258 minutes and 30 seconds.

No.	Title	Original release date
1	"Live from the Space Stage: A Halyx Story"	August 20, 2020
2	"Disney's FastPass: A Complicated History"	November 21, 2021
3	"Disney Channel's Theme: A History Mystery"	November 20, 2022
4	"Journey to EPCOT Center: A Symphonic History"	November 19, 2023
5	"Kid Cities"	June 18, 2024
6	"Disney's Animatronics: A Living History"	December 19, 2024
7	"Disney's Living Characters: A Broken Promise"	November 23, 2025
