= Handwich =

Cone-shaped sandwich associated with Walt Disney World

- Type: Sandwich
- Place of origin: United States
- Created by: The Walt Disney Company; Walt Disney Imagineering
- Invented: Late 1980s
- Main ingredients: Cone-shaped bread, filling
- Similar dishes: Ice cream cone, bread bowl

The Handwich was a cone-shaped sandwich with a filling, invented by The Walt Disney Company and served at the Tomorrowland, Epcot, and Adventureland theme park at Walt Disney World from the late 1980s to the mid-1990s. Marketed as a futuristic advancement of the sandwich and the wrap, the Handwich was specifically designed to be held and eaten with one hand. Though poorly received at the time and occasionally deemed an unnecessary reinvention in retrospectives, the Handwich has since been considered nostalgic, and products similar to it have continued to be sold at Walt Disney World and Disneyland over the years, though the "Handwich" branding has rarely been used since its discontinuation.

== Product ==
A Handwich consists of a soft, hollow, hand-sized bread cone with a filling, in a manner similar to an ice cream cone or a bread bowl. The fillings varied and were said to have changed over the years, though four basic fillings are often cited: ham and cheese, pulled barbecue chicken, roast beef and cheddar melt, and tuna salad. Turkey, spicy taco ground beef, chicken salad, and a vegetable filling with Italian dressing were also offered. Uncommon varieties—possibly seasonal items or tests—included seafood salad, vegetarian versions, and a sweet ambrosia salad filling.

The Handwich was designed to be simpler to hold and eat than a regular sandwich, only requiring the use of one hand instead of two; its conical shape also ensured the filling would not fall out. Though it was presented as a mere convenience, this design was also suggested to have encouraged customers to move around Walt Disney World instead of stopping to eat, promoting further consumption.

== History ==
The Handwich was invented in the late 1980s. Then-CEO Michael Eisner is often credited with the Handwich's invention, as part of his corporate reorganization and Disney Parks expansions. Eisner prompted Walt Disney Imagineering to create concepts for "fun food", based on his culinary experiences at the 1964 New York World's Fair; the Handwich, then called the "Castle Cone" and featuring moo shu shrimp and mixed berry fillings, was selected from the resulting concepts, though it was renamed to the "Handwich" and had its initial concept fillings replaced with simpler ones that were more consumer- and operations-friendly.

The Handwich was first sold in either 1986 or 1988. Advertising materials described it as "the sandwich of the future", "revolutionary", and "Disneylicious", and presented it as a futuristic advancement of the sandwich and the wrap. To fit its futuristic marketing, the Handwich was only sold in future-themed sections of Walt Disney World, namely the WEDway Space Bar in Tomorrowland, the Farmer's Market food court in The Land pavilion of Epcot, and (occasionally) at various restaurants in Adventureland. A unique Cobb salad version was made available at Disney-MGM Studios after it opened in 1989. The Handwich was eventually discontinued at an unspecified date in the mid-1990s.

=== Reintroductions and similar products ===
Since the Handwich's discontinuation, several similar conical sandwiches have been introduced at other Disney-operated restaurants at both Walt Disney World and Disneyland.

Its first reintroduction was in 2012, when the Crazy Cone Motel restaurant in Cars Land at Disney California Adventure introduced a "conewich", sold at the restaurant's Chili "Cone" Queso stand. The conewich originally had one filling of chili con carne with shredded cheese and corn chips. Two other fillings—one with chicken and salsa verde, and a breakfast filling with scrambled eggs and bacon—were also known to have been available. By 2022, a macaroni and cheese with bacon filling had replaced the chicken and breakfast fillings.

The following year, in 2013, Marketplace Snacks in Downtown Disney Orlando introduced cone sandwiches on their menu. There were two fillings: chili, cheese, and corn chips (the same conewich from the Crazy Cone Motel), and turkey meatball with marinara sauce and provolone. By 2016, however, the cone sandwiches were removed from Marketplace Snacks's menu.

The same year, cone sandwiches were also offered at Min and Bill's Dockside Diner in Disney's Hollywood Studios. It had three fillings: sausage with marinara sauce and mozzarella; Cajun shrimp salad; and chicken, bacon, and avocado salad. However, they were not well-received and were removed from the menu shortly after.

In 2014, cone sandwiches were made available at the Hollywood Hills Amphitheater in Disney's Hollywood Studios. Fillings included macaroni and cheese with bacon, and chili with cheese and jalapeño slices.

In 2017, to commemorate the 35th anniversary of Epcot's opening, the Epcot International Food & Wine Festival prepared several food items from Walt Disney World's past, including the Handwich, marking the first time it was sold with the "Handwich" name since its initial discontinuation. The festival's Handwich, sold at the Craft Beers stand, had a unique filling of cheeseburger and macaroni and cheese.

In 2022, Handwiches were served at RetroMagic, a Walt Disney World history convention organized by Disney Parks history organization RetroWDW.

== Reception and legacy ==
The Handwich was poorly received in the years it was available, and its attempt at succeeding traditional sandwiches did not catch on with parkgoers or the public. It was noted that restaurants serving Handwiches sold far more of their other dishes instead. In 1990, the Orlando Sentinel stated: "[I]t's well-intentioned and the name is clever. The last we checked, however, the Handwich had not exactly gripped the imagination of a hungry America, let alone Orlando. Let alone anyone but Michael Eisner."

Disney fansite Parkeology, in a 2010 retrospective, remarked that the conical design meant "[t]he first several bites would yield nothing but filling, and the last few were nothing but bread". They also noted the Handwich was commonly served with a fork—thus requiring both hands to eat—"rendering the whole point moot". However, not all reception was negative; in the same article, Parkeology commented on its charm as "something fun and new", and stated the Handwich was fondly remembered by those who had one when it was available.

The Handwich was the subject of the Defunctland minisode "The Handwich: Disney's Failed Sandwich of the Future", uploaded on YouTube on June 17, 2021. The minisode also includes a modern reproduction of the Handwich.

Also in 2021, the Handwich—specifically a modified "Handwich 3.0"—was one of the recipes included in Delicious Disney, a cookbook containing recipes for dishes sold at Walt Disney World. The book also includes a section dedicated to the Handwich's history.

== See also ==
- Temaki sushi, a cone-shaped style of sushi
