= Earffel Tower =

Faux water tower at Disneyland Paris

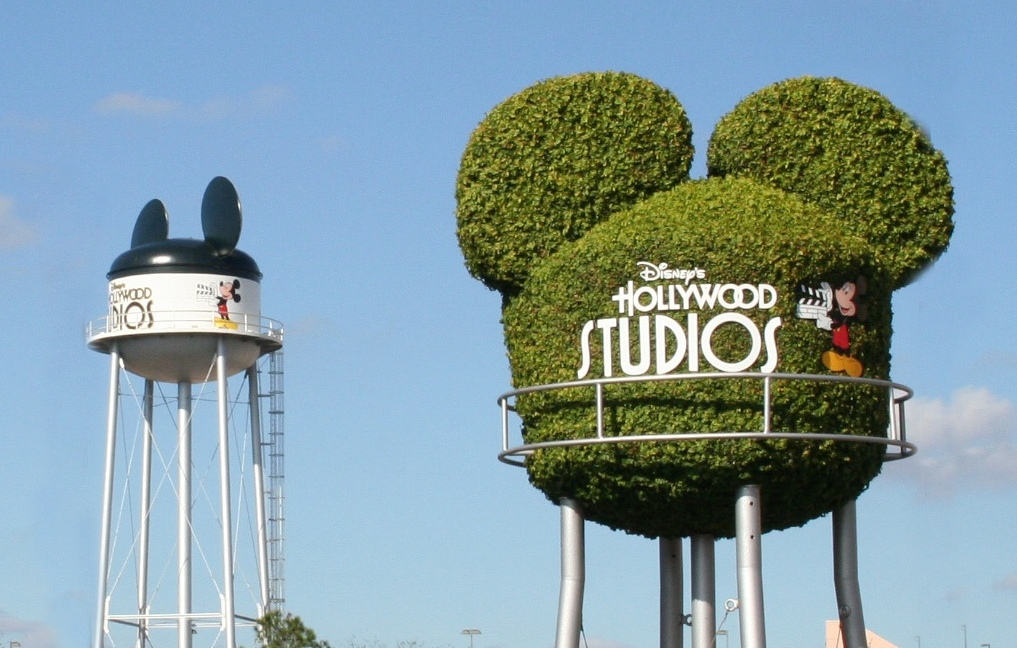
- Disney's Hollywood Studios' Earffel Tower and Topiary tribute in 2008 (above) and Earffel Tower at Walt Disney Studios Park, Paris, France in 2009 (below)

Disney's Hollywood Studios
- Area: Studio Backlot
- Coordinates: 28°21′24″N 81°33′46″W
- Status: Removed
- Opening date: May 1, 1989
- Closing date: April 29, 2016
- Replaced by: Slinky Dog Dash (Toy Story Land)

Disney Adventure World
- Area: Front Lot (2002–2024); World Premiere Plaza (2025–)
- Coordinates: 48.8732°N 2.776°E
- Status: Operating
- Opening date: March 16, 2002

Ride statistics
- Attraction type: Water tower
- Designer: Walt Disney Imagineering
- Height: 40 m (130 ft)
- Height (Paris): 33 m (108 ft)

The Earffel Tower is a faux water tower located at Disney Adventure World at Disneyland Paris in Seine-et-Marne, and formerly at Disney's Hollywood Studios at the Walt Disney World Resort in Bay Lake, Florida, near Orlando. Adorned with a set of Mickey Mouse ears, it is inspired by the real water tower located at the Walt Disney Studios in Burbank, California. A pun on the Eiffel Tower, it is based on water towers commonly found on Hollywood studio backlots of the first half of the 1900s, which were originally a safety measure to douse fires on highly flammable wooden film sets. However, the Earffel Tower has never contained water.

The first, 130-foot tower was located in the Studio Backlot Tour area of Disney's Hollywood Studios, known as Disney-MGM Studios when the park opened in 1989. It was the park's original icon, with The Great Movie Ride—a life-size replica of Grauman's Chinese Theatre—serving as the visual centerpiece. Both were displaced from icon status by the Sorcerer's Hat, which stood in the park's central hub from 2001 until its removal in 2015. The Earffel Tower was removed itself on April 29, 2016, to facilitate the construction of Toy Story Land. Since then, the Hollywood Tower Hotel has been the representative icon in marketing, with the Chinese Theatre (which now houses Mickey & Minnie's Runaway Railway) restored as the centerpiece.

The second, 108-foot tower at Disney Adventure World debuted in 2002 and has served as the park's icon ever since.

== See also ==
- Warner Bros. Water Tower, historic water tower on the Warner Bros. studio lot in Burbank, California
