= Warner Bros. Water Tower =

Historic water tower in Burbank, California

Coordinates: 34°09′02″N 118°20′19″W

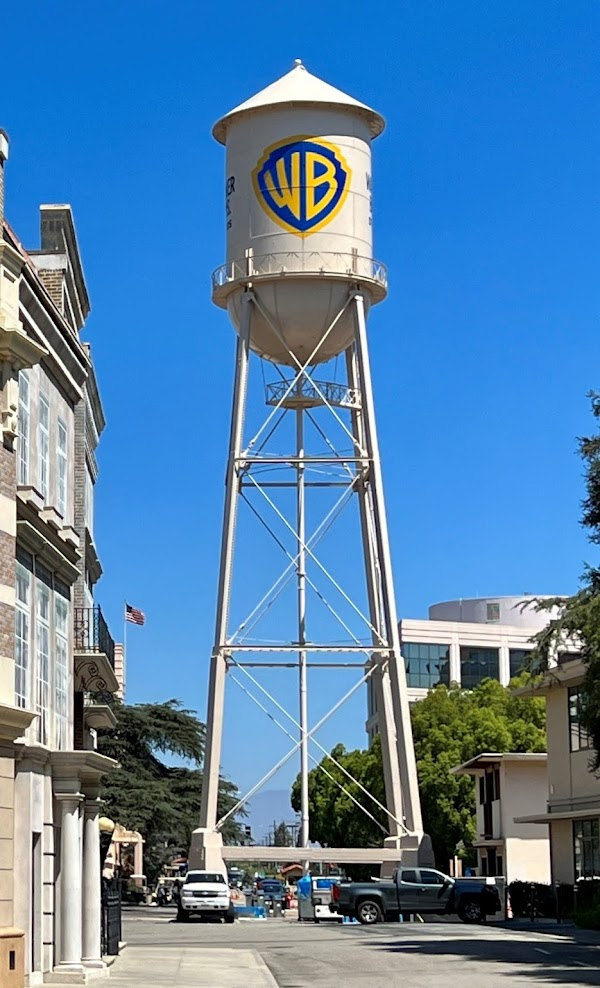
Warner Bros. Water Tower with the Warner Bros. Discovery shield logo in 2022 (since October 6, 2026 it includes "A Skydance Corporation" byline placed below the shield logo)

The Warner Bros. Water Tower is a historic water tower located at the Warner Bros. Studios in Burbank, California. Built in 1927, it stands 133 feet (41 meters) tall. The tank, which had a capacity of 100,000 U.S. gallons (380,000 L), is no longer used to hold water. It is decorated with the WB shield logo on either side and serves as a company icon.

== History ==
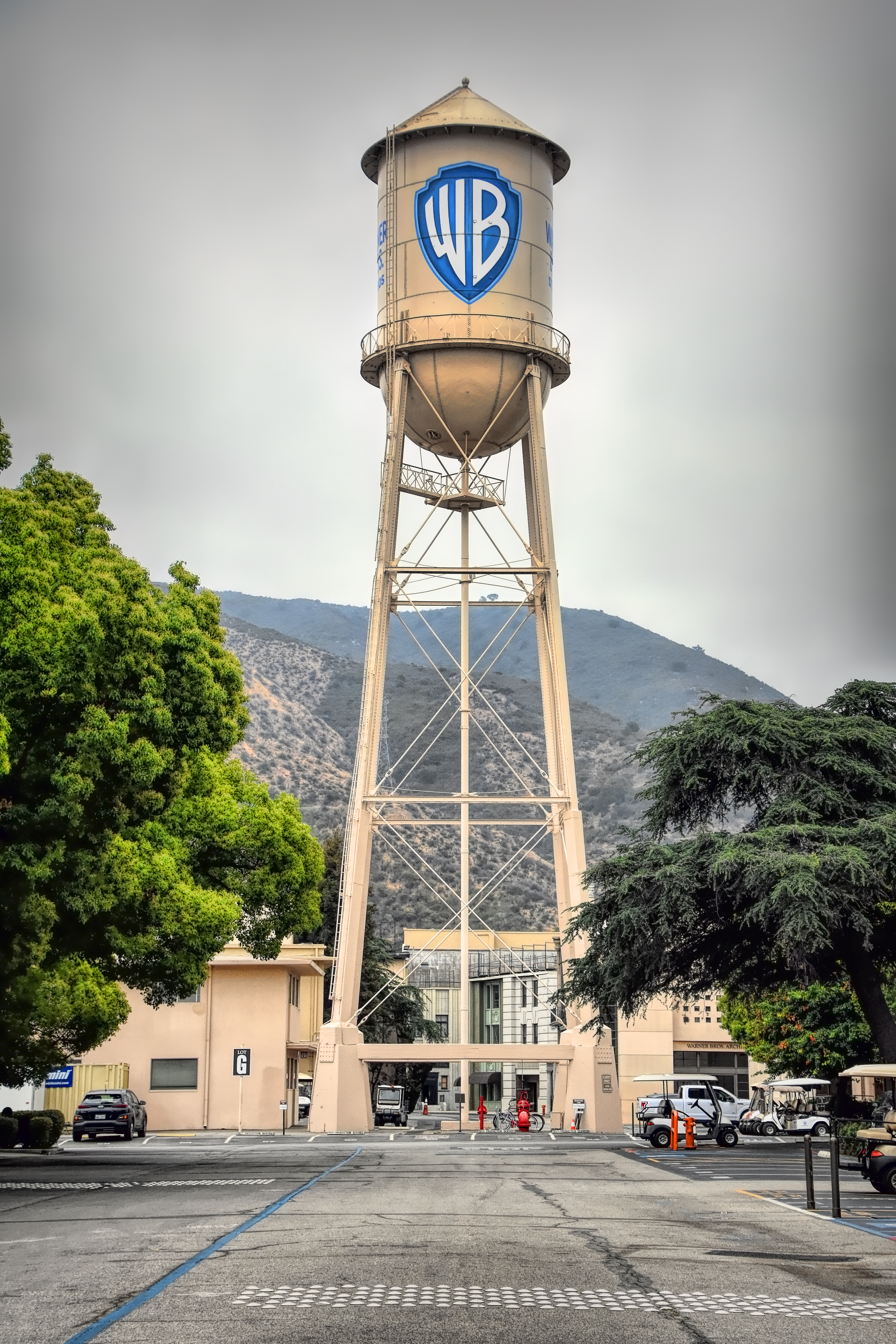
The Warner Bros. Water Tower in 2021, with the 2019 Warner Bros. shield logo that was used in the water tower until its change to the Warner Bros. Discovery shield in 2022, when WarnerMedia merged with Discovery to form WBD.

The tower was previously located next to the Warner Bros. Fire Department, and was moved following the 1933 Long Beach earthquake, when the Warners realized that if the tower fell onto the Fire Department, it would disrupt emergency assistance. Towers such as these were a common feature of Hollywood studios of the era, as they provided an emergency water supply in case of fire. Similar towers can be found at the Walt Disney Studios, Paramount and Sony Pictures Studios (formerly MGM) lots.

== Usage in media ==
The tower has appeared in a number of productions of the company, including any that showed the studio lot, whether live action or animated. For instance, it serves as the home for Yakko, Wakko, and Dot Warner in the Warner Bros. animated series Animaniacs, starting in-universe from the 1930s until their escape in the 1990s, with them moving back into the tower in the 2020 reboot. The tower, as depicted in the Animaniacs reboot, is featured as a stage in MultiVersus.

The water tower, including the Kids' WB logo adorning the tower since 1999, and its studio backdrop were used in interstitials for Kids' WB, a children's programming block that primarily ran from 1995 to 2006 on The WB network, and later on The CW network from 2006 to 2008. The tower is the basis for the name and logo of the company's record label, WaterTower Music.

In 2002, a version was built in Warner Bros. Park Madrid. In 2018, one was built at the front entrance of the Warner Bros. World theme park in Abu Dhabi, UAE.

Occasionally, the water tower has been repainted, e.g. to promote the 90th anniversary of the studio, the release of The Lego Batman Movie and Barbie, and the launch of HBO Max, and again to reflect the formation of Warner Bros. Discovery. The water tower was repainted once again to promote the studio's 100th anniversary.

Starting with the HBO Max original film, Locked Down (2021), the repainted water tower is featured in the then-new Warner Bros. Pictures opening logo for the first time and is now the focal point of the studio lot portion of the sequence, now rendered in photorealistic CGI. The entire opening sequence was rendered as CGI by Devastudios to show the studio lot at magic hour, with the sun rising over the Cahuenga Pass to the south, using Terragen for the sky and clouds, along with the studio's blueprints from the Warner Bros. Studio Facilities and the available photography and videography from Warner Bros. Studio Tour Hollywood and Google Maps, all in order to reconstruct it in CGI, with a new fanfare composed by Ludwig Göransson, starting with Don't Kill Me (2021).

In real life, the sun rises in the east, over the Forest Lawn cemetery and the Walt Disney Studios. Its sequence carried over to the Warner Animation Group logo, starting with Tom & Jerry (2021), while some elements carried over to the New Line Cinema logo, starting with Mortal Kombat (2021), both done by Devastudios and debuted in the same year as variants, as well as the logos of Warner Bros. Television (starting in 2021 and updated in 2023), Warner Bros. International Television Production (starting in 2021), Warner Horizon Unscripted Television (starting in 2024), and Warner Bros. Home Entertainment (starting in 2025), in which Devastudios created Warner Bros. Discovery's rendered logo in 2024 across all Warner Bros. brands, excluding Warner Bros. Pictures Animation, in which Devastudios used for its logo, and Warner Bros. Discovery. Starting with Wonka (2023), the logo was updated once again by Devastudios to feature the redesigned shield with the company name sash and banner. The CG elements were re-rendered using the Academy Color Encoding System (ACES), while the texture for the studio's water tower was updated using Adobe Substance 3D Painter.

At CinemaCon 2026, the logo for Warner Bros. Pictures Animation was revealed, which features a similar sequence to the Warner Bros. Pictures logo, which is done by Devastudios, being shown in sketch, abstract drawing (inspired by Looney Tunes), painting/portrait (inspired by The Iron Giant (1999)) and the familiar photorealistic CGI rendering, which featured an updated look of the studio lot, in which Tweety from Looney Tunes was featured as a "cameo". It featured a brand new fanfare featuring "Merrily We Roll Along" from Looney Tunes and "Classic Reflection" from the Warner Bros. Pictures logo, composed, arranged and conducted by Yoffee, co-conducted by Parnther, orchestrated by Markey, and mixed by LaRocca, which was recorded on October 24, 2025. The logo was later shown to the public following Warner Bros. Pictures Animation's panel at that year's Annecy International Animation Film Festival and is set to debut in The Cat in the Hat (2026).

In October 2026, the water tower was repainted to add "A Skydance Corporation" below the WB shield; it was added the same day Paramount merged with Warner Bros. to form Skydance Corporation.

== Gallery ==
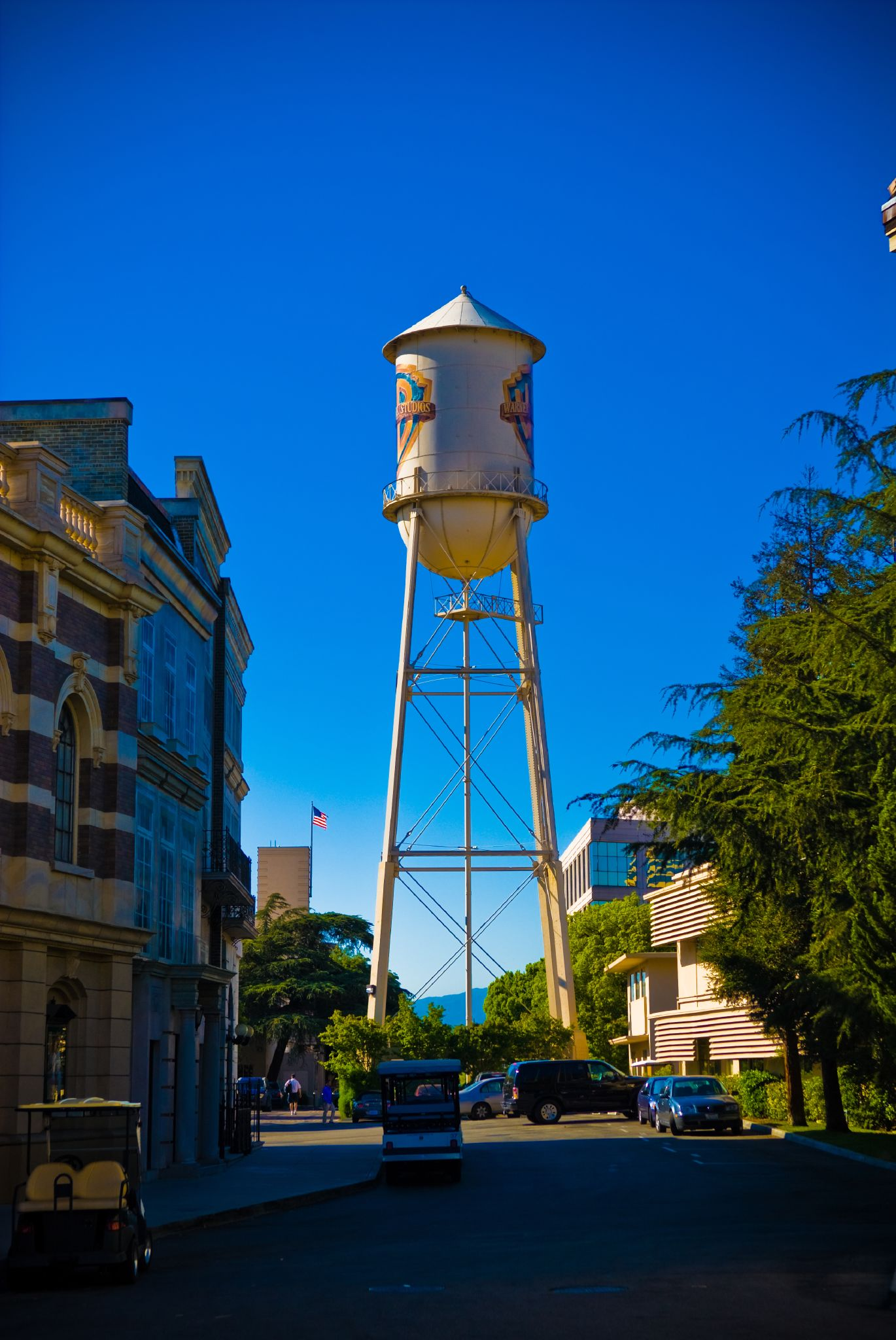
2007

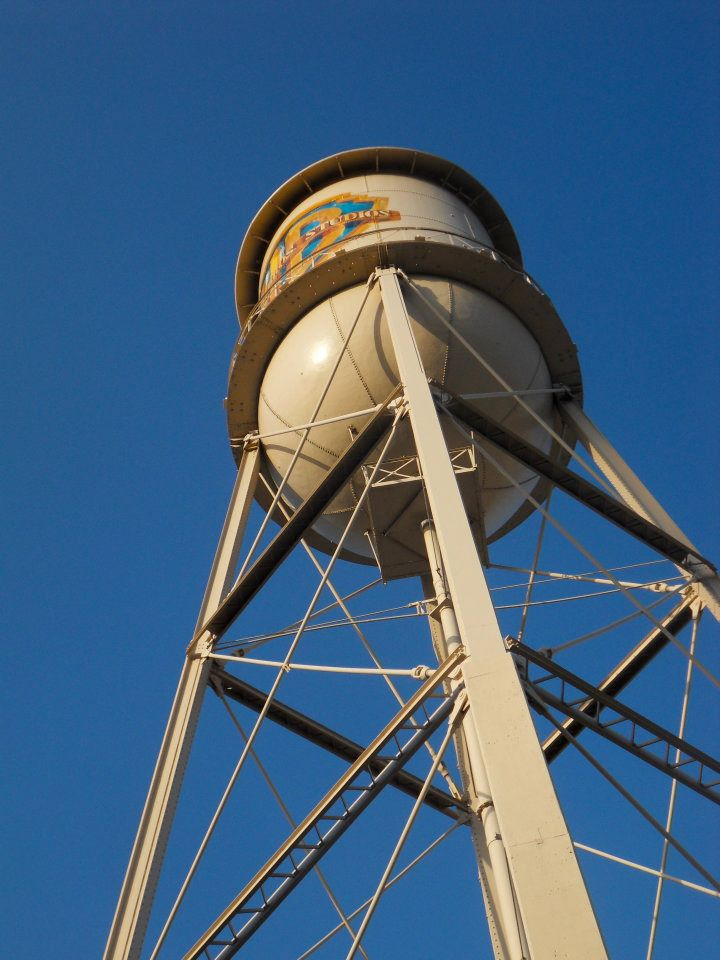
2012

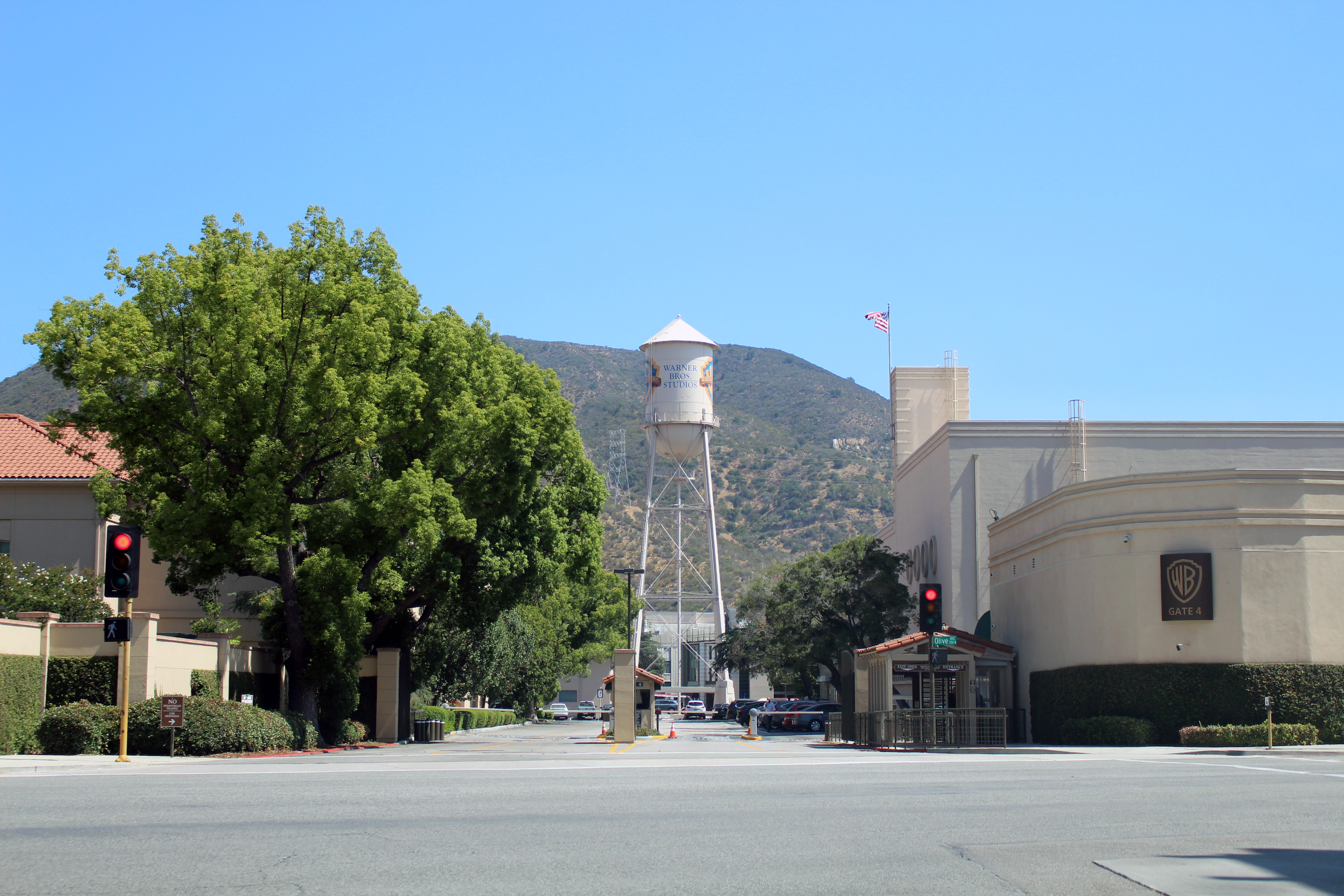
2016

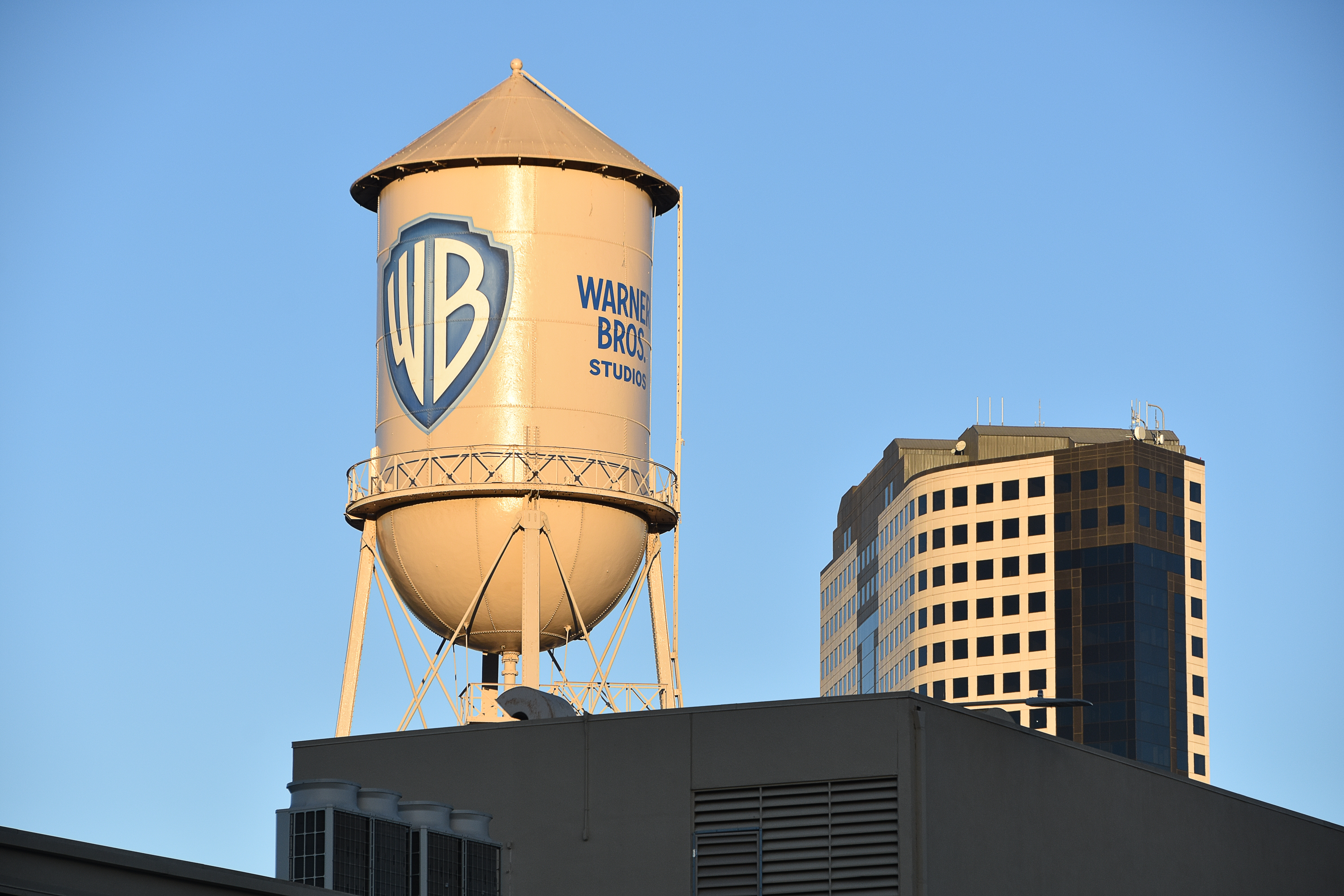
2020

== See also ==
- Earffel Tower, a faux water tower at Disneyland Paris' Walt Disney Studios Park and formerly at Disney's Hollywood Studios in Walt Disney World
