= Mama Melrose's Ristorante Italiano =

Italian-American Restaurant in Florida, United States

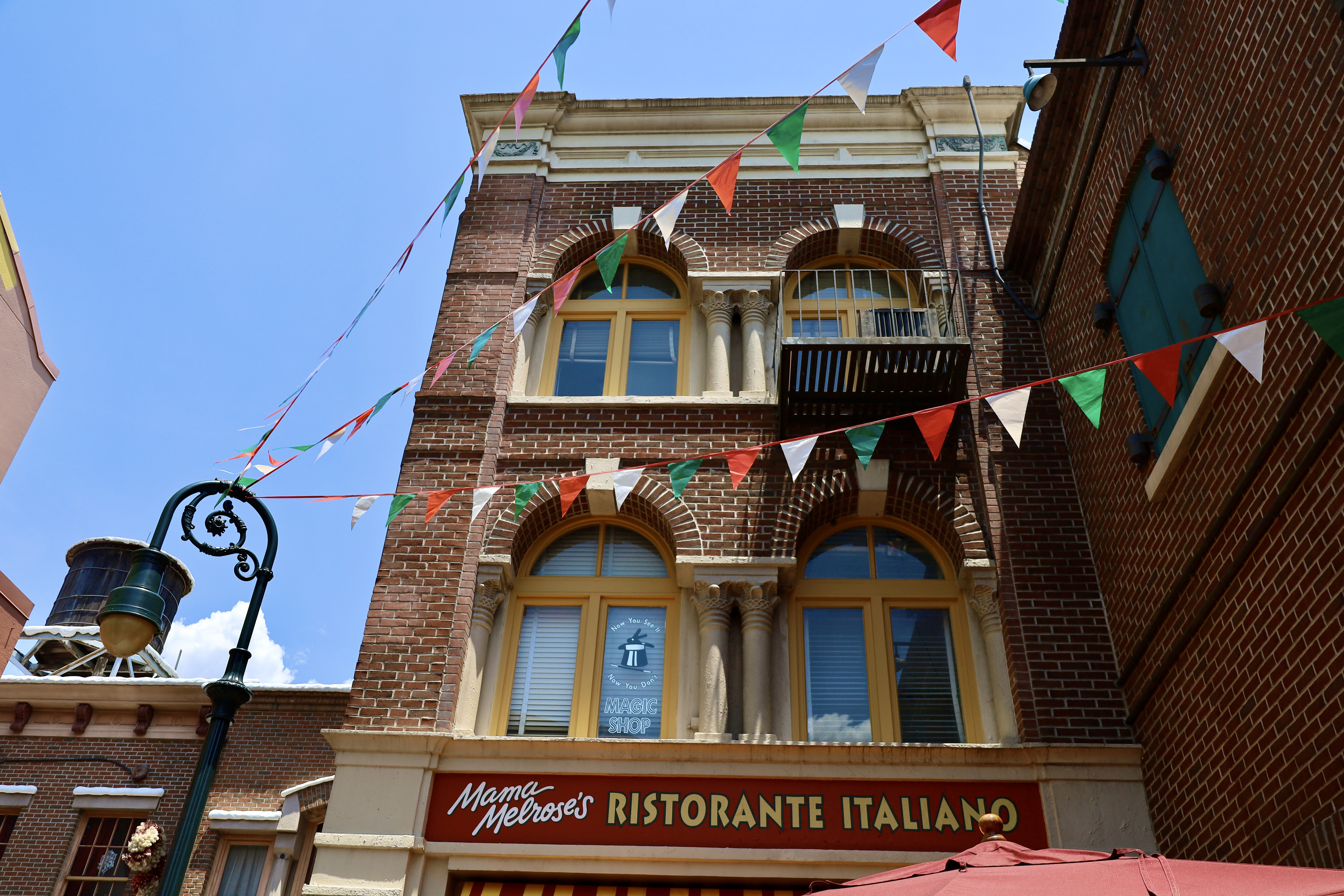
- The exterior of Mama Melrose's Ristorante Italiano
- Interactive map of Mama Melrose's Ristorante Italiano

Restaurant information
- Owner: Walt Disney Parks, Experiences and Consumer Products
- Food type: Italian-American cuisine
- Location: Bay Lake, Orange County, Florida, 32830, United States
- Coordinates: 28.3545657°N 81.5591489°W

Mama Melrose's Ristorante Italiano was an Italian-American restaurant in the Grand Avenue area at Disney's Hollywood Studios. Located near Muppet*Vision 3D and Star Tours, the restaurant specialized in Italian cuisine, and served such dishes as ossobuco, wood-fired flatbread pizza, and grilled salmon and sausage grinders. A Fantasmic! dinner package was available that granted restaurant guests quicker access to this show. This package is also offered at two other restaurants in the park: the Hollywood Brown Derby and Hollywood & Vine. Ron Douglas included the recipe for Mama Melrose's cappuccino crème brûlée in his cookbook America's Most Wanted Recipes: Just Desserts.

Mama Melrose's was decorated with film memorabilia and Italian bric-à-brac. The restaurant's background music consisted of songs sung by such Italian-American singers as Tony Bennett and Frank Sinatra.

Mama Melrose's closed on May 10, 2025 to make way for new restaurants, such as Harryhausen's for the upcoming Monstropolis area for the park.

== Italian-American Restaurant Music ==
"California Dreamin'" - The Mamas and the Papas

Walk of Life - Dire Straits

It Never Rains in Southern California - Albert Hammond

That’s Amore - Dean Martin

Bella Notte - Instrumental

== Bibliography ==
- Douglas, Ron (2012). America's Most Wanted Recipes: Just Desserts. Simon & Schuster. ISBN 978-1451623369.
- Goldsbury, Cara (2005). The Luxury Guide to Walt Disney World Resort: How to Get the Most Out of the Best Disney Has to Offer. Globe Pequot Press. ISBN 0762739576.
- Hess, Jennie (2009). Fodor's 2010 Walt Disney World: Plus Universal Orlando and SeaWorld. Fodor's Travel Publications. ISBN 978-1400008544.
- Ingersoll, Doug (2005). Plan Your Walt Disney World Vacation in No Time. Pearson Education. ISBN 0789734028.
- Miller, Laura Lea (2007). Walt Disney World & Orlando For Dummies 2007 (7 ed.). John Wiley & Sons. ISBN 978-0470112748.
- Sandler, Corey (2007). Walt Disney World Resort: Also Includes Seaworld and Central Florida. Globe Pequot Press. ISBN 978-0762741694.
- Sehlinger, Bob; Menasha Ridge; Len Testa (2012). The Color Companion to Walt Disney World (2 ed.). John Wiley & Sons. ISBN 978-1118225462.
- Shumaker, Susan; Than Saffel (2003). Vegetarian Walt Disney World and Greater Orlando: The Essential Guide for the Health-Conscious Traveler. Globe Pequot Press. ISBN 0762727039.
- Tunstall, Jim; Cynthia Tunstall (2004). Frommer's Walt Disney World & Orlando with Kids. John Wiley & Sons. ISBN 0764569929.
- Veness, Susan; Simon Veness (2012). The Hidden Magic of Walt Disney World Planner: A Complete Organizer, Journal, and Keepsake for Your Unforgettable Vacation. F+W. ISBN 978-1440528101.
