= Sorcerer's Hat =

Former icon of Disney's Hollywood Studios

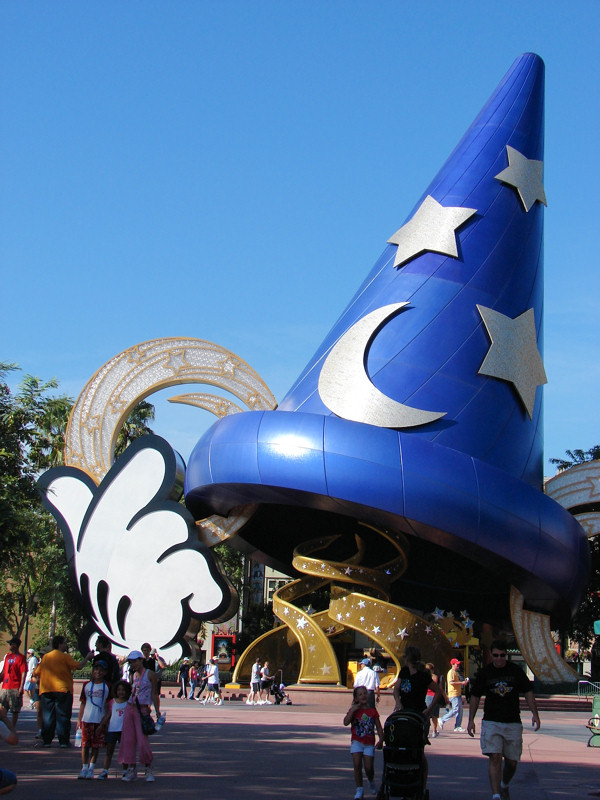
- Front view of The Sorcerer's Hat

Disney's Hollywood Studios
- Area: Hollywood Boulevard
- Coordinates: 28.356944°N 81.560297°W
- Status: Removed
- Opening date: September 28, 2001
- Closing date: January 7, 2015

Ride statistics
- Designer: Walt Disney Imagineering
- Theme: Fantasia
- Height: 122 ft (37 m)

The Sorcerer's Hat was a structure and the thematic icon of Disney's Hollywood Studios, the third of four theme parks built at the Walt Disney World Resort in Bay Lake, Florida, from 2001 to 2015. The structure was inspired by The Sorcerer's Apprentice segment in Walt Disney's 1940 animated film, Fantasia. Mickey Mouse's gloved hand and ears underneath the hat are visible emerging from the ground. With its opening on September 28, 2001, it replaced the Earffel Tower as the park's icon in marketing material. It was used as a venue for pin trading and sales, and also served as a backdrop to many special events and shows. High School Musical Live culminated several dances from various Disney Channel shows, which performed several times daily in front of the hat. Disney characters made meet-and-greet appearances around the hat throughout the day.

== History ==
Built in front of The Great Movie Ride, the Sorcerer's Hat debuted on September 28, 2001 as part of the 100 Years of Magic celebration at Walt Disney World Resort. During the celebration, interactive kiosks were installed underneath the Sorcerer's Hat where guests could learn about Walt Disney's life and career. When the celebration ended in early 2003, the kiosks were removed. On May 20, 2011, the Sorcerer's Hat served as the venue for the grand opening ceremony for Star Tours - The Adventures Continue.

The Sorcerer's Hat originally was going to be built outside of the park, in the space cleared for David Copperfield's Magic Underground Restaurant that ultimately was not built. Originally going to be twice the height, with two Ferris wheels as ears, and Walt Disney: One Man's Dream underneath, the plans were changed when the retail side of the park decided to fund it, reposition it at the center of the park, and repurpose it as a pin trading station.

During the time of the hat's removal, Disney's Hollywood Studios was going through diverse changes to improve their census. For example, The American Idol Experience, the Studio Backlot Tour, and The Legend of Captain Jack Sparrow attractions recently closed during the same few years. Imagineers were also planning to update The Great Movie Ride at the Chinese Theatre due to its new sponsor, Turner Classic Movies.

In October 2014, Disney confirmed that the Sorcerer's Hat would be removed by early 2015. Removing the Sorcerer's Hat was an idea the company thought about when trying to find a way to attract a bigger audience. Although the hat brought together the magical, beneficent energy of Disney itself, several people thought the design and placement was never a good idea. Many fans complained about its obscuring design, hiding the park's replica Chinese Theatre located directly behind the structure.

The structure's removal began on January 7, 2015, and was completed on February 25, 2015. Once the hat was fully taken down, a stage was placed in front of the Chinese Theatre to host incoming Star Wars fireworks and other short shows from 2016 to 2020.

In April 2026, a new smaller version of the Sorcerer's Hat was installed on top of The Magic of Disney Animation in The Walt Disney Studios Lot, which opened on May 26, 2026 at Disney's Hollywood Studios.

== Other versions ==
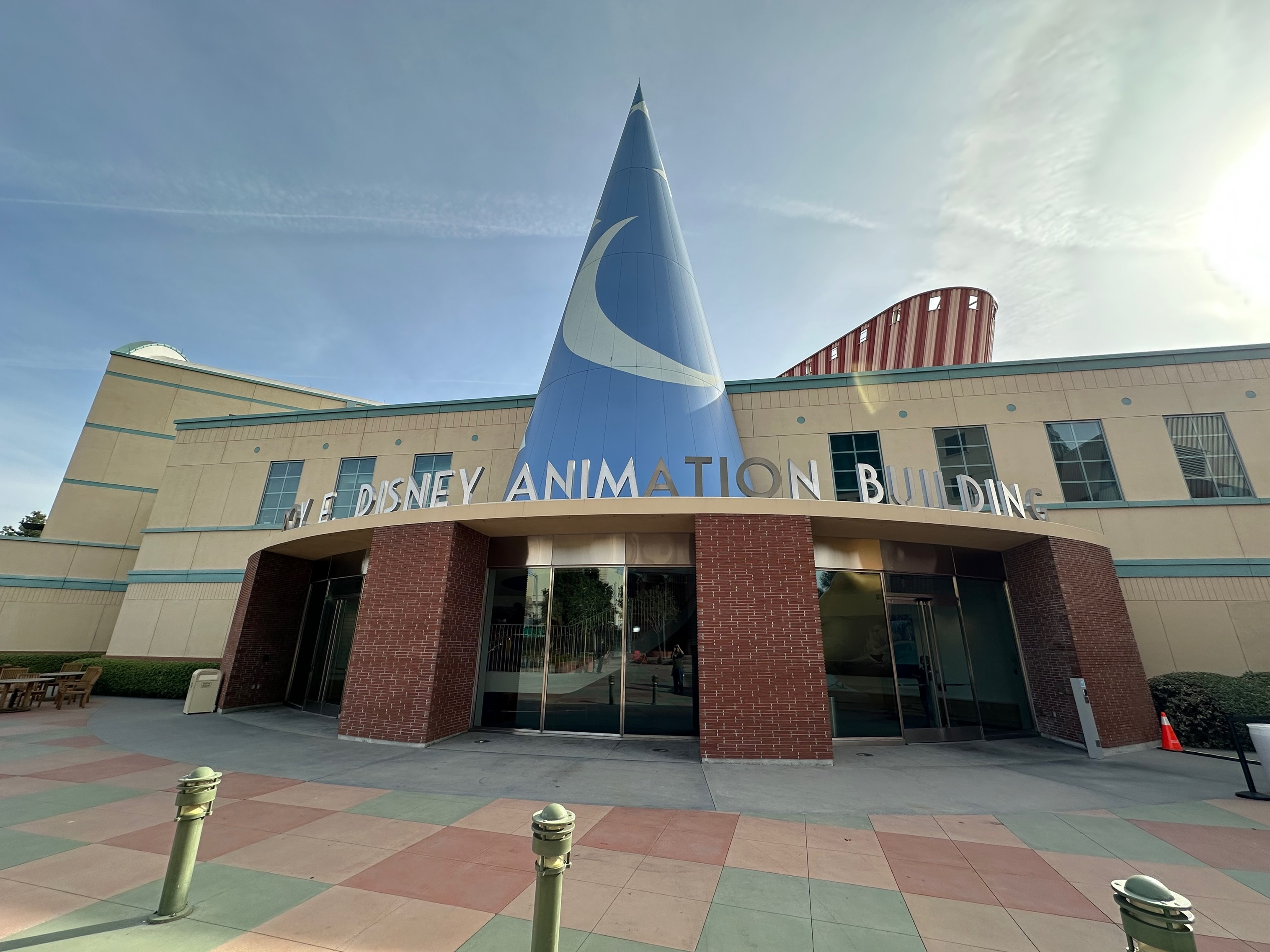
Roy E. Disney Animation Building

Another version of the Hat is part of the Roy E. Disney Animation Building at Walt Disney Studios in Burbank, California, which previously held Roy E. Disney's office.

At Walt Disney Studios Park, the Art of Animation building has a hat resembling the one in Burbank.

The Sorcerer's Hat also appears in one of the longest lasting shows at the park. Fantasmic! debuted October 15, 1998, telling the story of Mickey's dreams and nightmares of his adventurous sleep. The night-time show features assorted Disney clips and films, including The Sorcerer's Apprentice. Through the water projections, Mickey appears with the hat, controlling the brooms to continue the chores his master left for him. He moves around the stage quickly, changing outfits in quick transformations. By his second-to-last outfit, he officially wears his red robe and sparkling Sorcerer's Hat to produce the fireworks for the grand finale. The hat symbolizes a celebration of magic after Mickey defeated the nightmares and dark thoughts in his sleep.

== In fiction ==
The Sorcerer's Hat was originally the hat of Yen Sid in The Sorcerer's Apprentice segment in Walt Disney's 1940 animated film Fantasia. Mickey Mouse, as the Sorcerer's lazy apprentice, puts on the hat to attempt to use magic to perform his chores, but the magic grows out of Mickey's control.

The Sorcerer's Hat appears in the movie The Sorcerer's Apprentice in the post-credits scene, where Horvath retrieves his hat from Balthazar's shop.

The Sorcerer's Hat appears throughout season 4 of the Disney-produced television series Once Upon a Time as a powerful artifact, capable of stealing powers from magic users. Queen Elsa's parents wanted the Hat to take away her ice powers, and Rumpelstiltskin wanted the hat to free himself of the control of his cursed dagger.

== "Piece of Walt Disney World History" ==
Walt Disney World's merchandise later released a black, zip-up hoodie with different icons of each park in silver. Made in the late 2010s, the hoodie held the Sorcerer's Hat in the middle-left of the back. Now, the jacket with the hat can be bought only through online, secondhand stores. The newer jacket displays the same design, but holds the Tower of Terror in replacement of the hat.

Pieces of the hat were sold as part of the pin series "Piece of Walt Disney World History". The pins had a series size of 1,500, cost US$15.95, and were released on January 7, 2016.
