= Disney's Hollywood Studios =

Theme park at Walt Disney World

- Previously known as Disney-MGM Studios (1989–2008)
- Logo used since 2019

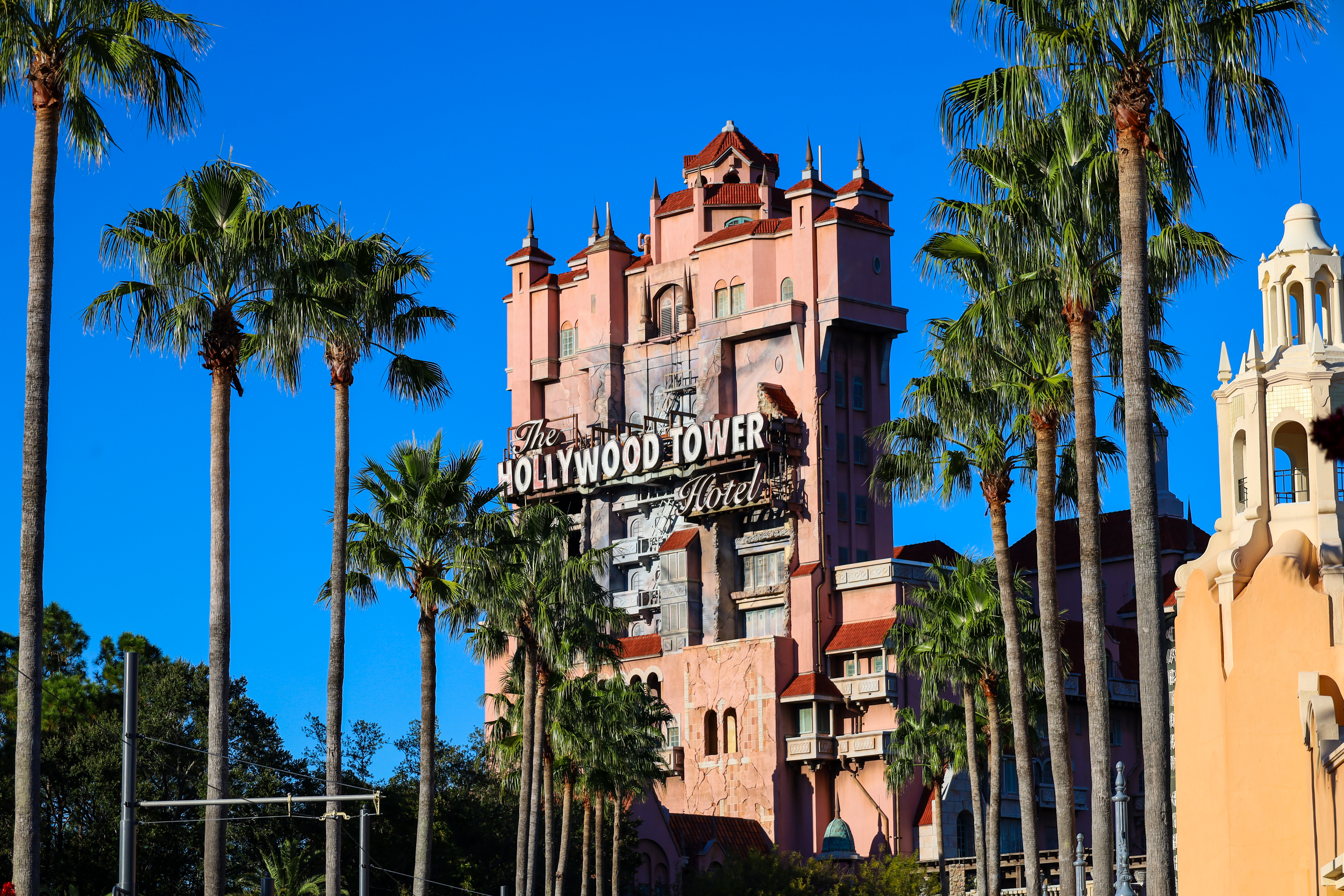
- The Hollywood Tower Hotel, a landmark of the park
- Interactive map of Disney's Hollywood Studios
- Location: Walt Disney World, Bay Lake, Florida, United States
- Coordinates: 28°21′27″N 81°33′36″W
- Status: Operating
- Opened: May 1, 1989
- Owner: Disney Experiences (The Walt Disney Company)
- Operated by: Walt Disney World
- Theme: Golden Age of Hollywood and imagined worlds of cinema
- Operating season: Year-round
- Attendance: 10.333 million (2024)
- Area: 135 acres (55 ha)

Attractions
- Total: 9 (including roller coasters): Alien Swirling Saucers; Mickey & Minnie's Runaway Railway; Millennium Falcon: Smugglers Run; Star Tours – The Adventures Continue; Star Wars: Rise of the Resistance; Toy Story Mania!; The Twilight Zone Tower of Terror
- Roller coasters: 2: Rock ‘n’ Roller Coaster Starring the Muppets; Slinky Dog Dash
- Website: Official website

Disney's Hollywood Studios is a theme park at the Walt Disney World Resort in Bay Lake, Florida, near Orlando. It is owned and operated by the Walt Disney Company through its Experiences division. Based on a concept by Marty Sklar, Randy Bright, and Michael Eisner, the park opened on May 1, 1989, as the Disney-MGM Studios Theme Park, and was the third of four theme parks built at Walt Disney World. Spanning 135 acres (55 ha), the park is themed to an idealized version of Hollywood, California, and is dedicated to the imagined worlds from film, television, music, and theatre, drawing inspiration from the Golden Age of Hollywood.

Disney's Hollywood Studios was initially developed as both a theme park inspired by show business and an operating production studio, with active film and television production services, an animation facility for Walt Disney Animation Studios, and a functioning backlot. Construction on the combined park and studio began in 1987, but was accelerated when the construction of the similarly themed Universal Studios Florida began a few miles away. To increase public interest and the variety of film representation within the park, Disney entered into a licensing agreement with Metro-Goldwyn-Mayer (MGM), from which the park's original name was partially derived. The park's production facilities were removed throughout the 2000s, and many of the park's soundstages were retrofitted for newer attractions and guest use. The park's current name took effect in 2008, with the removal of the MGM-branding throughout the park. In the 2010s, the park began to distance itself from the original studio backlot intention and entered a new direction of immersive theming and attraction development inspired by imagined worlds from Hollywood storytellers.

The park's original landmark was the Earffel Tower, a faux water tower topped with Mickey Mouse ears. In 2001, the Sorcerer's Hat—a stylized version of the magical hat from Disney Animation's 1940 film Fantasia—was erected in the park's central hub and served as the icon until its removal in January 2015. The Earffel Tower was also removed the following year. The Hollywood Tower Hotel has since been the official icon, with the park's replica of Grauman's Chinese Theatre serving as the visual centerpiece. In 2025, the park hosted 10.312 million guests, ranking it the tenth most-visited theme park in the world.

== Dedication ==
The World you have entered was created by The Walt Disney Company and is dedicated to Hollywood—not a place on a map, but a state of mind that exists wherever people dream and wonder and imagine, a place where illusion and reality are fused by technological magic. We welcome you to a Hollywood that never was—and always will be.

— Michael Eisner, May 1, 1989

== History ==
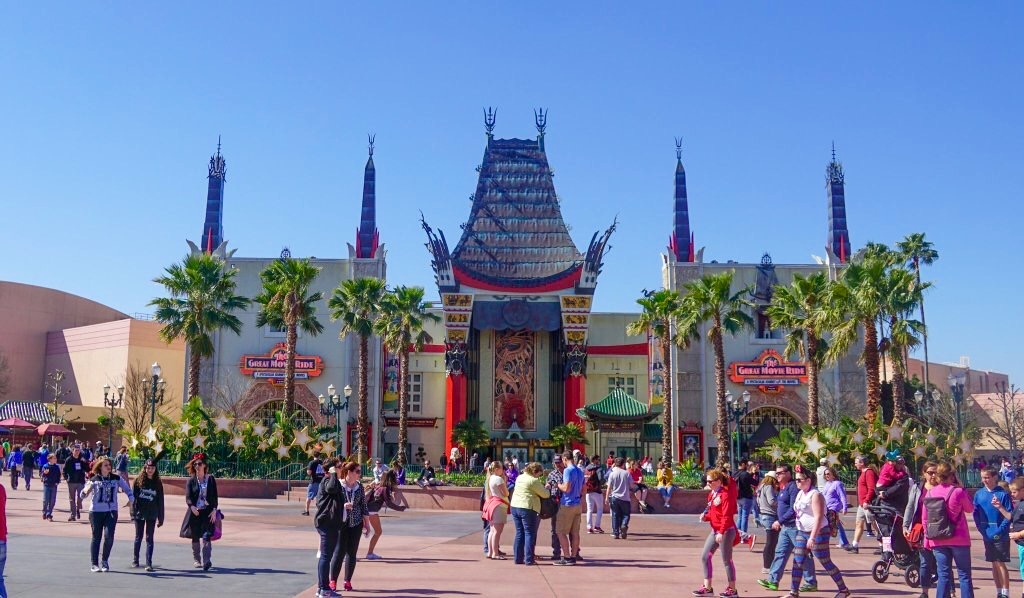
The Chinese Theatre, the visual centerpiece of the park's hub, pictured in 2016. Originally serving as the location for The Great Movie Ride from 1989 to 2017, the building has housed Mickey & Minnie's Runaway Railway since 2020.

A team of Walt Disney Imagineers led by Marty Sklar and Randy Bright was assigned to develop two new pavilions for Epcot's Future World section. The planning resulted in concepts for the Wonders of Life pavillion and a Show Business pavilion, the latter featuring an attraction originally called Great Moments at the Movies. The Show Business pavillion was to have a soundstage-style backdrop and a movie theater-style entrance, and would have sat between the Land and Journey Into Imagination pavilions.

After Michael Eisner became Disney's CEO, he and other Disney executives saw the potential for the Show Business attraction to be the anchor for a new park themed with Hollywood, entertainment, and show business.

As plans for the new park took shape, Disney and Metro-Goldwyn-Mayer (MGM or MGM/UA) entered into a 20-year licensing contract in 1985 that gave Disney rights to use the MGM brand, logo and films for a movie production facility and studio tour called the “Disney-MGM Studio Tour”. MGM would receive royalties for Disney’s use of the logo, but it would not be a co-owner of the attraction.

Plans for the studio tour attraction grew to include working production facilities for films and television shows, a backlot, and a satellite animation studio for Walt Disney Feature Animation, which began operation prior to the park's debut. In 1988, MGM/UA filed a lawsuit that claimed Disney violated its agreement by operating a working movie and television studio at the resort. Disney later filed a countersuit, claiming that MGM/UA and MGM Grand, Inc. had conspired to violate Disney's rights to the MGM name in the theme park business and that MGM/UA would harm Disney's reputation by building the MGM Grand Adventures Theme Park in Las Vegas, Nevada. On October 23, 1992, Los Angeles Superior Court Judge Curtis B. Rappe ruled that Disney had the right to continue using the Disney-MGM Studios name on film product produced at the Florida facility, and that MGM Grand had the right to build a Las Vegas theme park using the MGM name and logo as long as it did not share the same studio backlot theme as Disney's property. The 33-acre (130,000 m^{2}) MGM Grand Adventures Theme Park opened in 1993 at the Las Vegas site and closed permanently in 2000. Disney was contractually prohibited from using the Disney-MGM Studios name in certain marketing contexts, such as content distribution like home videos.. In those instances, the park was called Disney Studios or Disney Studios Florida.

On May 1, 1989, the theme park opened adjacent to the production facilities, with the only two operating attractions were the Studio Backlot Tour and the Great Movie Ride. Several months after park opening, the "Streetmosphere" improvisational troupe was added to the park. The Streetmosphere performers, now named the Citizens of Hollywood, are the longest-running attraction at the park.

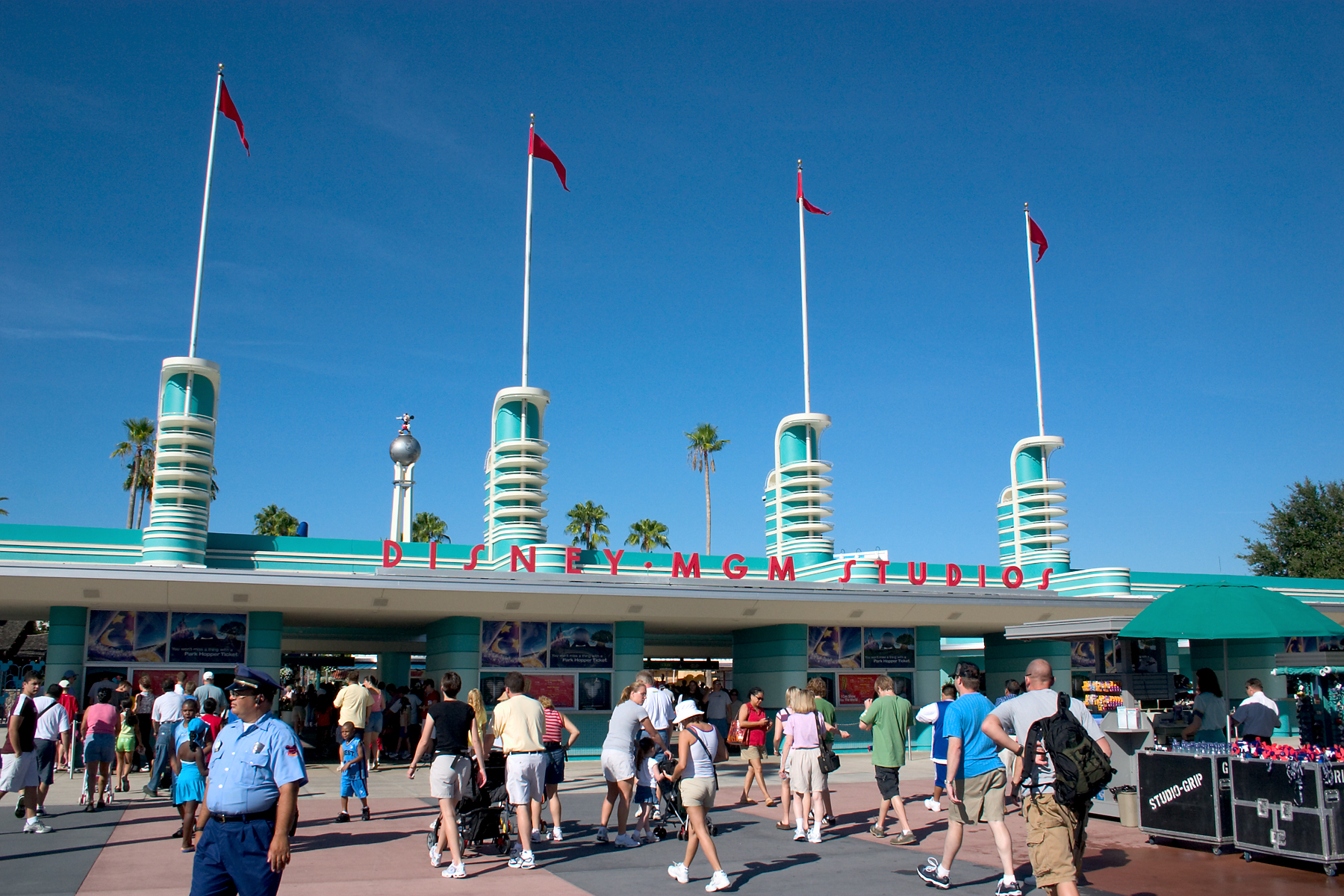
The park's entrance gate bearing the original name in its signage.

In the 1990s, as the park's popularity and attendance grew, the park saw its first expansion in 1994, with the addition of Sunset Boulevard and The Twilight Zone Tower of Terror attraction. The backlot's New York streets were opened to guest access to relieve traffic and renamed as Streets of America. During that same decade, Walt Disney Feature Animation's on-site satellite studio assisted in the production of Beauty and the Beast, Aladdin, and The Lion King, with Mulan and Lilo & Stitch being completed entirely at the park's studio. The Sunset Boulevard area would receive an expansion in the late 1990s, starting with the installation of Fantasmic!, a nighttime show that opened in 1998, six years after the debut of its predecessor at Disneyland. The next year in 1999, an indoor darkened roller coaster, Rock 'n' Roller Coaster Starring Aerosmith, officially opened to the public. It was the first Walt Disney World coaster to feature inversions.

In 2001, the Sorcerer's Hat—a stylized version of the magical hat from Fantasia—was erected in front of the park's Chinese Theater and began to serve as the park's icon from then onwards, displacing the Earffel Tower in that role. In 2004, Disney shuttered the Florida animation unit. The previous summer, the backlot's Residential Street was demolished to accommodate the new location for Lights, Motors, Action!: Extreme Stunt Show, an American adaptation of Moteurs ... Action!: Stunt Show Spectacular at Walt Disney Studios Park. The stunt show would open along with Soarin' at Epcot in 2005 to coincide the Happiest Celebration on Earth festival. On August 9, 2007, Disney announced that Disney-MGM Studios would be rebranded as Disney's Hollywood Studios, effective January 7, 2008. That same year, the former Stage 1 soundstage became home to Toy Story Mania! and the surrounding area was rethemed as Pixar Place.

In the 2010s, Disney began phasing out the park's "studio-like" attractions that headlined the park during its early years of operation. This included the closure of the park's Studio Backlot Tour, American Idol Experience, and the Legend of Captain Jack Sparrow attractions in 2014. The following year, the Sorcerer's Hat was removed and the original sightlines from Hollywood Boulevard to the park's Chinese Theatre were restored. In March 2015, during an annual shareholders meeting, Disney CEO Bob Iger hinted at another possible name change for the park due to the changes coming in the near future. However, the company denied the rumors of a name change in February 2018. The park continued to close more studio-themed attraction; in April 2016, the majority of Streets of America—including the backlot street facades, the Lights, Motors, Action! Extreme Stunt Show, the Earffel Tower, and the remaining backstage areas—was closed and demolished in preparation for Star Wars: Galaxy's Edge and Toy Story Land. In 2017, the Great Movie Ride closed as the final remaining opening-day attraction and was replaced by Mickey & Minnie's Runaway Railway in 2020.

The park was closed from March 16 to July 15, 2020, due to the COVID-19 pandemic in Florida. In 2025, Muppet*Vision 3D and the surrounding Muppet-themed courtyard was closed. The area is expected to be re-themed to Pixar's Monsters, Inc. franchise, including Disney's first suspended roller coaster. Also, in 2025, the Florida version of Star Wars Launch Bay and the entire Animation Courtyard closed and make way for a new land as The Walt Disney Studios Lot, which is the named after the real-life studio campus in California, in the summer of 2026. On March 2, 2026, Rock 'n' Roller Coaster Starring Aerosmith closed and was rethemed as Rock 'n' Roller Coaster Starring The Muppets, which reopened on May 26.

== Park layout and attractions ==
Disney's Hollywood Studios is divided into seven themed areas, each inspired by either romanticized versions of real locations in Hollywood and greater Los Angeles or imagined worlds drawn from Hollywood-born stories. The park’s original layout once formed a large Hidden Mickey, visible in early guide maps and aerial photographs, though subsequent construction and redesigns have removed most traces of it. Several themed areas feature prominent façades and buildings modeled after both existing and defunct structures from across Los Angeles, including those found in Hollywood, Pasadena, Inglewood, and Burbank.

=== Hollywood Boulevard ===
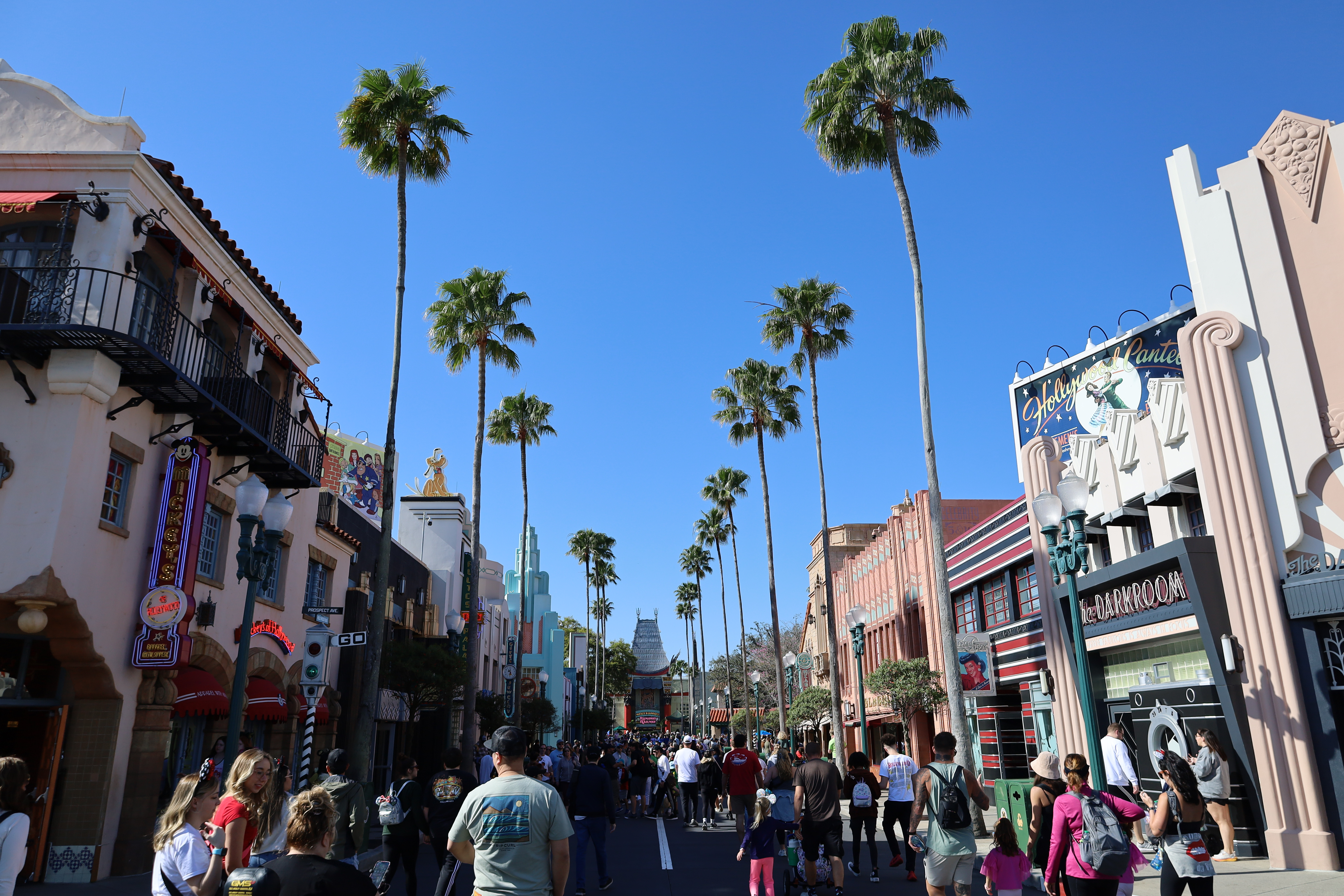
Hollywood Boulevard

Hollywood Boulevard, inspired by the real street of the same name, serves as the park's main entrance and operates in the same vein as Main Street, U.S.A. at Magic Kingdom. It is lined with themed streetscape facades and venues selling Disney merchandise and park services. Guests enter through the main entrance gate, which resembles the Pan-Pacific Auditorium. Near the park's gate is a recreation of the Crossroads of the World tower. Live street entertainment and seasonal parades travel down the main street throughout the day. At the far end of Hollywood Boulevard stands an exact replica of Grauman's Chinese Theatre, which houses Mickey & Minnie's Runaway Railway, a dark ride themed to the world of Mickey Mouse animated shorts. Near the entrance of the Walt Disney Studios Lot—resides The Hollywood Brown Derby restaurant, a themed replica of the original Brown Derby restaurant in Hollywood, California.

=== Echo Lake ===
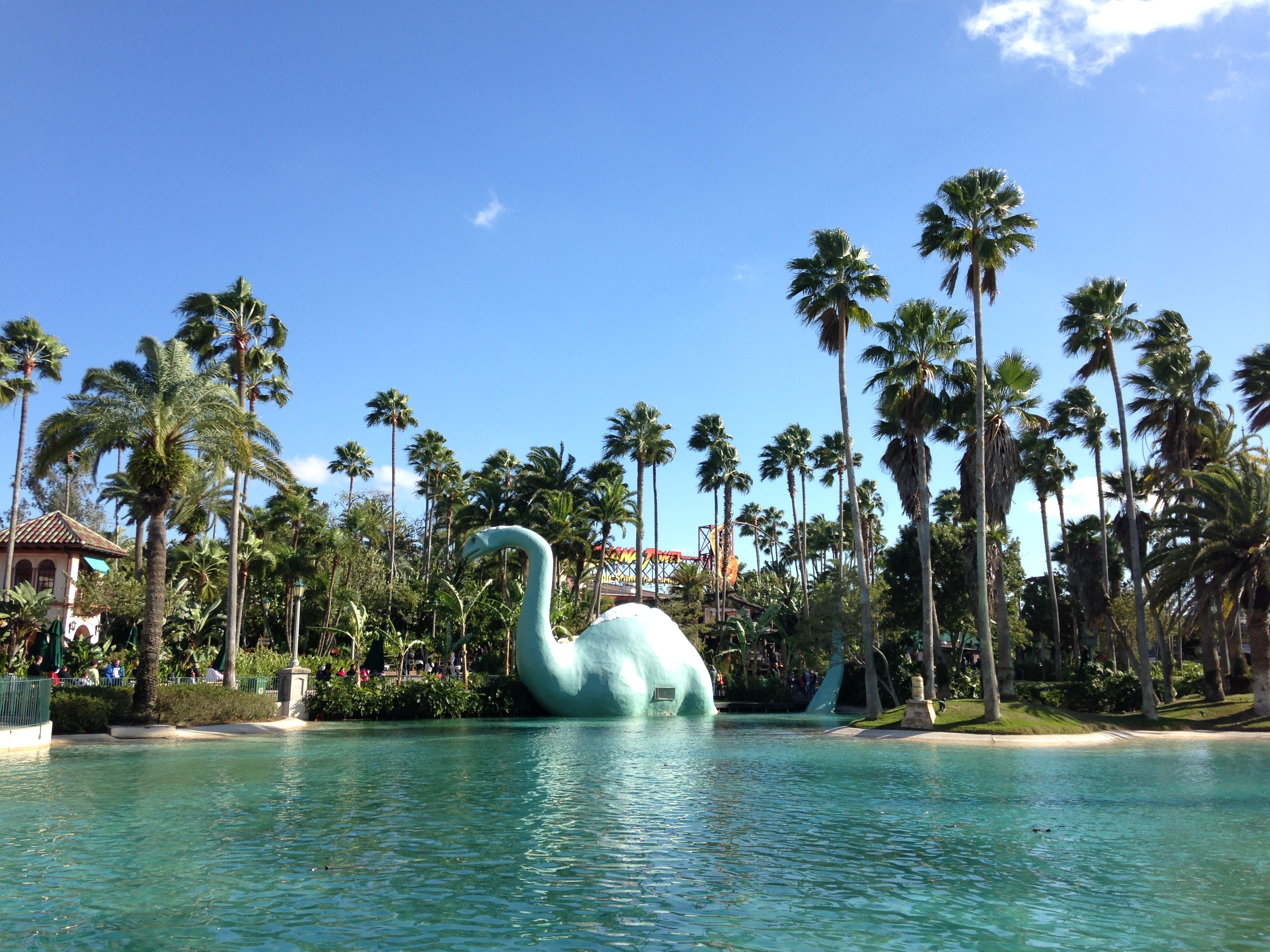
Echo Lake

Echo Lake, inspired by the similarly named neighborhood in Los Angeles, is designed to mimic the suburban "California Crazy" form of architecture from Hollywood's Golden Age and is anchored around the area's namesake lake.

Echo Lake features two major attractions based on characters and films created by George Lucas and produced by Lucasfilm. Star Tours – The Adventures Continue is a 3-D motion simulator ride set in the Star Wars universe. In the open-air Epic Theater, the live-action Indiana Jones Epic Stunt Spectacular! re-enacts various action scenes from Steven Spielberg's Raiders of the Lost Ark, with professional film stunt actors performing as Indiana Jones and Marion Ravenwood.

The Hyperion Theater houses For the First Time in Forever: A Frozen Sing-Along Celebration, a musical show based on Disney's Frozen. Behind this building lies a subsection named Commissary Lane, that connects Hollywood Boulevard directly to Grand Avenue and bypasses Echo Lake altogether. In this area, resides two eateries: ABC Commissary, a quick-service restaurant themed to ABC television programs and the Sci-Fi Dine-In Theater Restaurant, a dinner theater with a retro-style theme featuring vintage car themed tables and a large movie screen featuring continuous clips of science-fiction films from the 1950s.

=== Grand Avenue ===
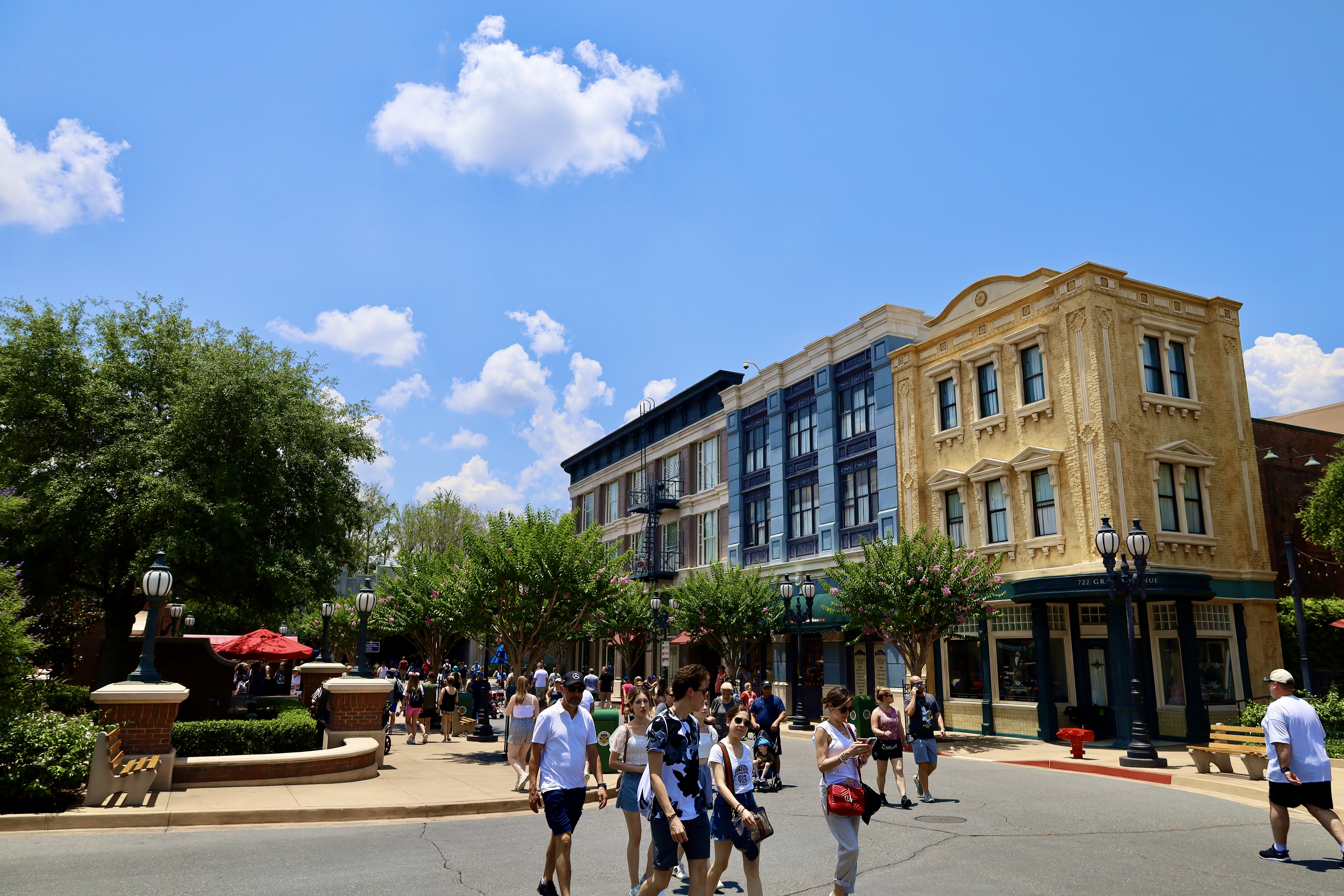
Grand Avenue

Grand Avenue is themed as a gentrified historic district inspired by the real location of the same name in downtown Los Angeles. The area features BaseLine Tap House, a modern California-styled pub. The main street of Grand Avenue leads into a recreation of a Figueroa Street Tunnel which connects Grand Avenue to the adjacent Star Wars: Galaxy's Edge.

Grand Avenue was originally planned in the 1980s as a themed area called Muppet Studios, centered around the Muppets from Jim Henson's The Muppet Show, following Disney's intended acquisition of the Jim Henson Company. The area's design included Muppet*Vision 3D, a 4D film attraction, as well as a themed restaurant and a Muppet dark ride parody of The Great Movie Ride. The deal fell through after Henson's death in 1990, and only Muppet*Vision 3D was developed and later opened in 1991. The Muppet-themed restaurant was reworked into Mama Melrose's Ristorante Italiano.

The realized Muppet-themed section became a part of the park's former Streets of America area, which encompassed several attractions, including an urban street amalgamation of New York City and San Francisco. The area's namesake street facades were formerly the park's working backlot set, which was originally a component of the park's inaugural Studio Backlot Tour, and opened to pedestrian park traffic in the mid-1990s; this area closed on April 2, 2016, to accommodate the construction of Galaxy's Edge. PizzeRizzo, a New York-style pizzeria owned by Rizzo the Rat, opened in 2016. The Muppet-themed areas and a single remaining New York block of the Streets of America facades were repurposed into Muppets Courtyard, which served as a placeholder designation until Grand Avenue was completed in September 2017. The entirety of the Muppet-themed areas—including Muppet*Vision 3D and PizzeRizzo—as well as Mama Melrose's, closed in 2025, to make way for a new area as Monstropolis, which is inspired by Pixar's Monsters, Inc. franchise. This new area will open in phases, with the first phase expected to open in 2027.

=== Star Wars: Galaxy's Edge ===
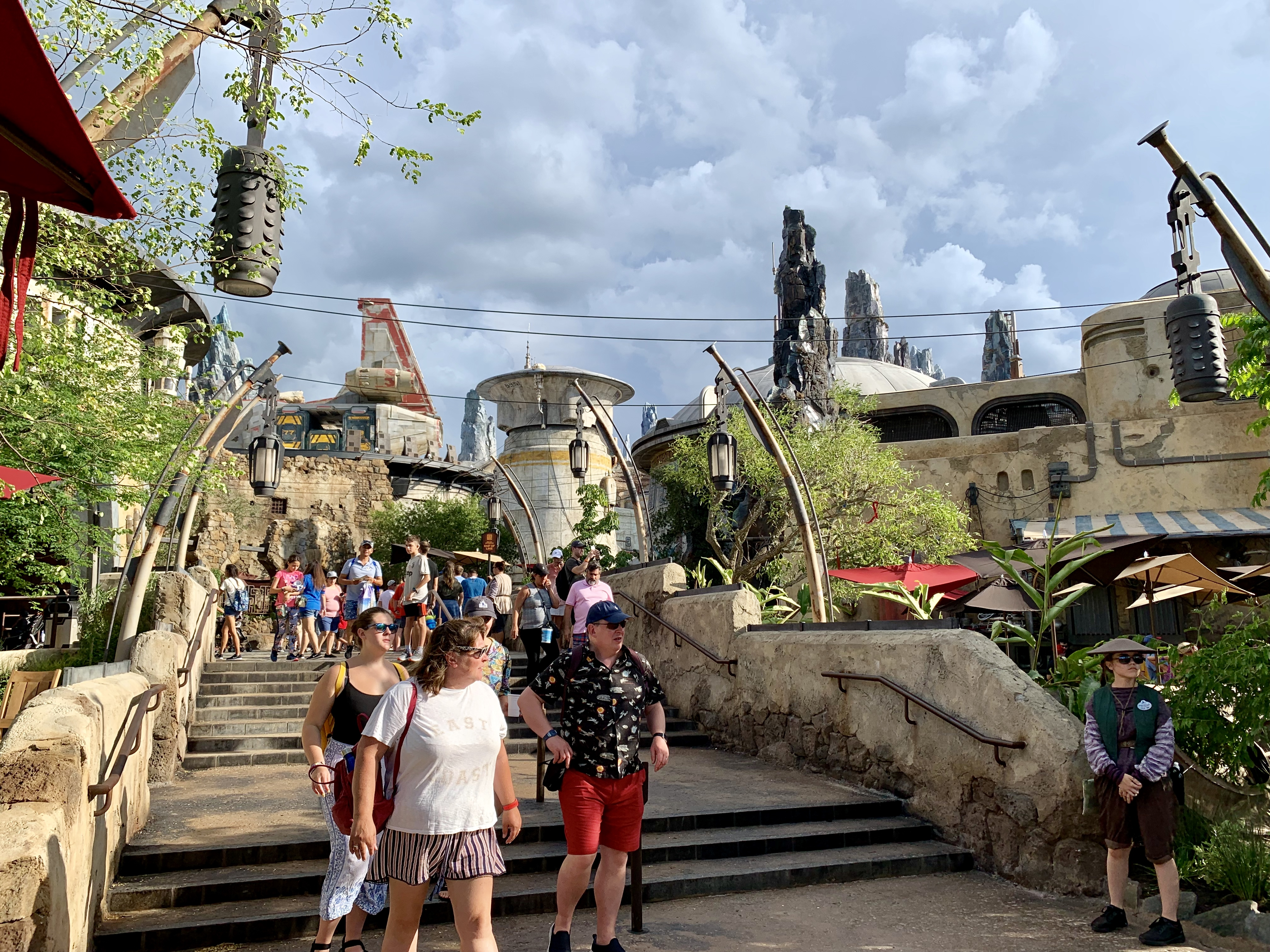
Star Wars: Galaxy's Edge

Star Wars: Galaxy's Edge is set within the Star Wars universe, at the Black Spire Outpost village on the remote frontier planet of Batuu. Attractions include Star Wars: Rise of the Resistance, a dark ride that places guests in a climactic battle between the First Order and the Resistance; and Millennium Falcon: Smugglers Run, a flying simulator attraction that allows guests to pilot the Millennium Falcon through a customized secret mission on behalf of Hondo Ohnaka and Chewbacca. Restaurants and shops include Oga's Cantina, Savi's Workshop, and the Droid Depot. The land opened in 2019, replacing the park's Streets of America section. The 14-acre (5.7 ha) area cost an estimated $1 billion.

=== Toy Story Land ===
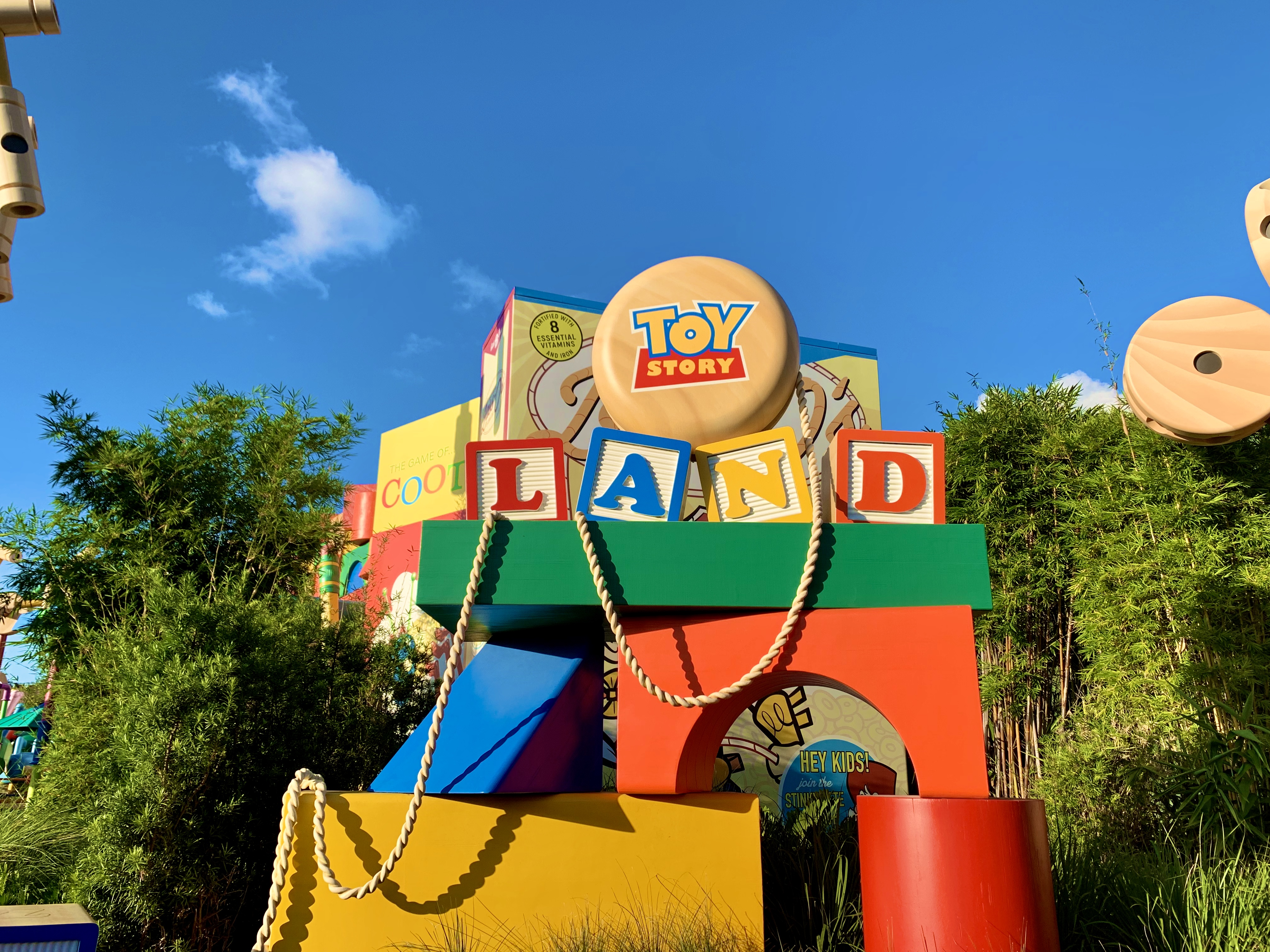
Toy Story Land

Toy Story Land is inspired by Pixar's Toy Story series. The 11-acre (4.5 ha) area is themed to Andy's backyard with three attractions, each hosted by characters from the series. The attractions include Toy Story Mania!, an interactive 4D attraction inspired by classic carnival midway games; Slinky Dog Dash, an outdoor roller coaster; and Alien Swirling Saucers, a Whip ride. The land opened on June 30, 2018.

Toy Story Mania! was originally a standalone attraction within Pixar Place, an area dedicated to films and characters created by Pixar, resembling the animation studio's Emeryville, California campus. Pixar Place was also the home of Luxo Jr., a six-foot-tall audio-animatronic version of Pixar's desk-lamp mascot. The moving character performed periodic shows throughout the day and evening across from Toy Story Midway Mania.

=== The Walt Disney Studios Lot ===
The Walt Disney Studios Lot

The Walt Disney Studios Lot is a recreation of the Walt Disney Studios campus in Burbank and features attractions based on characters and films produced by Walt Disney Animation Studios. Inspired by the 2023 animated short Once Upon a Studio, the lot includes static figures of Disney animated characters designed to appear as though they have come to life throughout the area.

The Magic of Disney Animation is a live walk-through tour depicting an "open house" of the studio hosted by the studio's characters. Inside the Studio Theater is The Little Mermaid – A Musical Adventure, a musical stage show production based on the 1989 animated film The Little Mermaid. Walt Disney Presents is a walk-through exhibit that explores the life and legacy of Walt Disney through photos, models, artifacts, and a short biographical film Walt Disney: One Man's Dream, narrated by Julie Andrews in the Walt Disney Theater.

This section of the park originally was the starting point for the Studio Backlot Tour, with its entrance being marked by a traditional "studio arch". From 1989 to 2004, the site was the operations for Walt Disney Feature Animation Florida, with the Magic of Disney Animation operating as a walk-through tour. The original incarnation of the Magic of Disney Animation closed in 2015 and was replaced with Star Wars Launch Bay, a Star Wars exhibit that featured behind-the-scenes props and character meet-and-greets with Darth Vader, Chewbacca, and BB-8. The exhibit, along with a majority of Animation Courtyard closed on September 25, 2025, and was redeveloped and reopened on May 26, 2026 as The Walt Disney Studios Lot, with the Magic of Disney Animation returning.

=== Sunset Boulevard ===
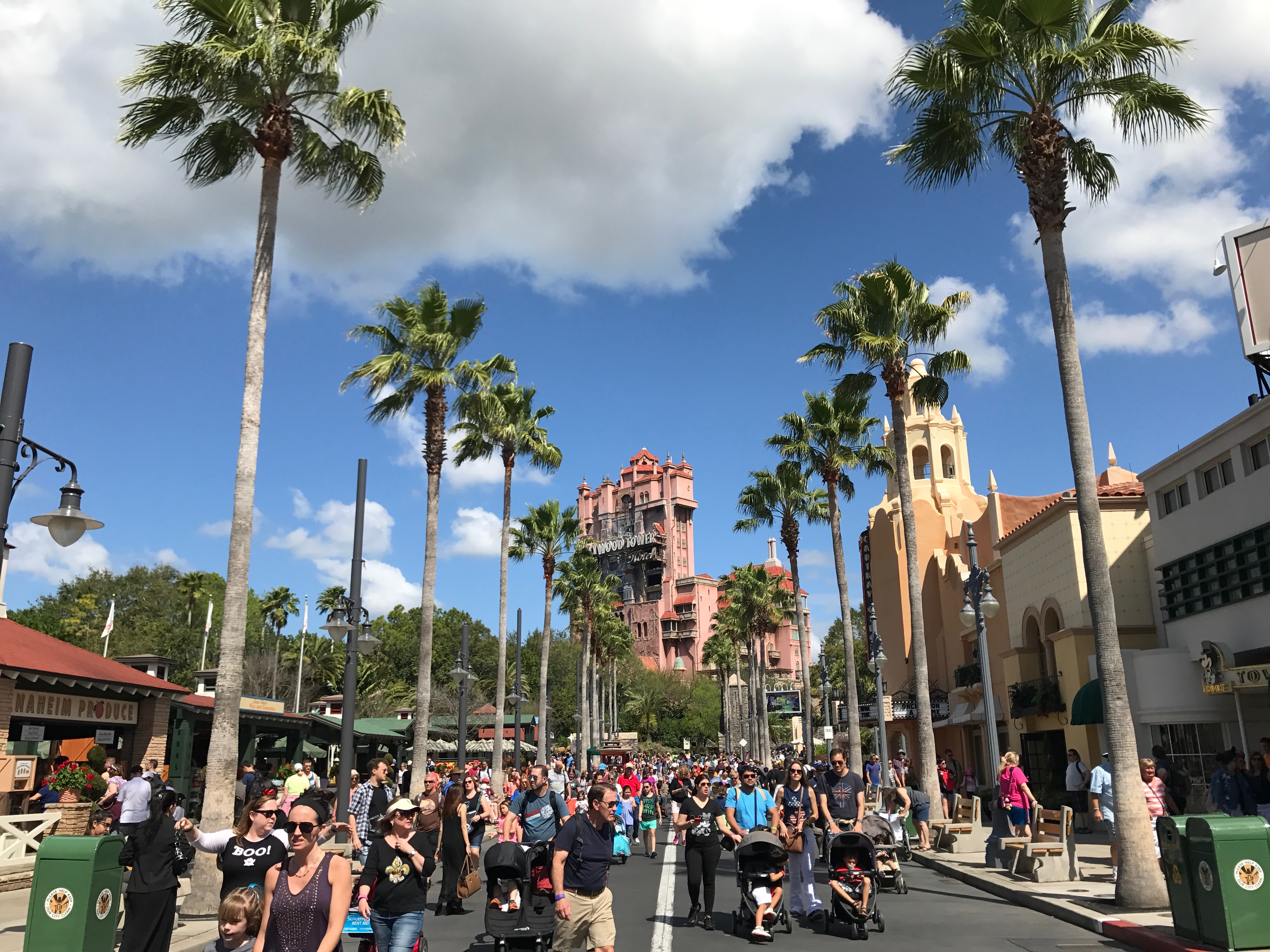
Sunset Boulevard

Sunset Boulevard, named after the real thoroughfare of the same name, features theaters, boutique shops, and marketplaces, as well as recreations of the Cathay Circle Theatre, Academy Theatre, and The Original Farmers Market. The focal point of Sunset Boulevard is the Hollywood Tower Hotel which houses The Twilight Zone Tower of Terror, a drop tower thrill ride themed to an abandoned hotel and inspired by Rod Serling's The Twilight Zone. Located nearby is Rock 'n' Roller Coaster Starring The Muppets, an indoor darkened roller coaster in G-Force Records Studio featuring the Muppets from Jim Henson's The Muppet Show, with three inversions and a high-speed launch. Sunset Boulevard was the first expansion of the park, opening in July 1994.

Sunset Boulevard is the park's theater district with two outdoor amphitheaters, and one indoor black box-style theater. The covered Theater of the Stars hosts Beauty and the Beast Live on Stage, a stage show featuring highlights from the 1991 animated film. The larger open-air Hollywood Hills Amphitheater is the home of Fantasmic!, a nighttime show featuring Mickey Mouse and other Disney heroes and villains in a story with fireworks, lasers and water effects. The indoor Sunset Showcase Theater hosts the Disney Villains: Unfairly Ever After, a stage show hosted by Disney Villains.

== Live entertainment ==
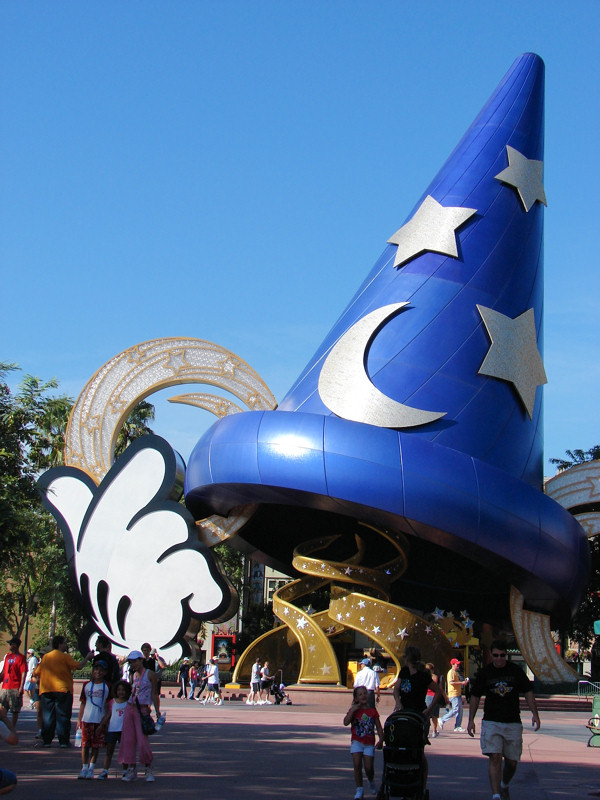
The Sorcerer's Hat stood at the park's hub between 2001 and 2015.

Disney's Hollywood Studios has featured numerous forms of in-park entertainment throughout its history. During its early years, the park featured the "Star Today" program, with a daily celebrity guest. The celebrity would often be featured in a motorcade along Hollywood Boulevard or would take part in a handprint ceremony at the Great Movie Ride's entrance, or participate in an interview session.

At other times, Disney has licensed characters and intellectual properties that were not part of its own original library of films and television shows. In addition to MGM properties, some of these characters have included the Teenage Mutant Ninja Turtles, Ace Ventura: Pet Detective, and characters from the Goosebumps series by author R. L. Stine. The Mighty Morphin Power Rangers made appearances in the park during the first seasons of the television series but then vanished. Disney had ownership of the Power Rangers franchise through its purchase of Saban Entertainment until May 2010 when Saban purchased the franchise back and were regular members of the park's cast of characters during that time. Live musical acts, such as the cover band Mulch, Sweat and Shears and the a cappella quartet Four For a Dollar, used to perform on the park streets or as pre-show entertainment at the larger shows.

Like Disney's Animal Kingdom, Disney's Hollywood Studios also used to run daily parades down Hollywood Boulevard. The Disney Stars and Motor Cars Parade and the Block Party Bash featured film characters performing in a street party along Hollywood Boulevard and near Echo Lake. Several times each day, the "High School Musical 3: Senior Year: Right Here Right Now" show used to travel Hollywood Boulevard before performing a live street show in front of the Sorcerer's Hat.

Streetmosphere performers have been present at Disney's Hollywood Studios since 1989. They are the only opening day attraction left in the park. The improv troupe was originally called Streetmosphere, but later renamed to the Citizens of Hollywood. They perform magic, skits, and interact with guests multiple times a day on Sunset Boulevard and Hollywood Boulevard.

== Annual events ==
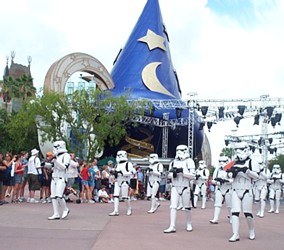
Imperial Stormtroopers parade near the Sorcerer's Hat during Star Wars Weekends.

Disney's Hollywood Studios has hosted several events during the years that often draw thousands of fans to the park.

- ESPN The Weekend (late winter) featured commentators from the Disney-owned cable sports channels as well as sports celebrities. The event was started in 2004 and permanently cancelled in July 2011.
- Star Wars Weekends (May–June) brought Star Wars fans and celebrities together for special park events. Running Fridays-Sundays throughout June, they featured the 501st Legion (a worldwide Star Wars costuming group) parading through the park in costumes that include Stormtroopers, TIE fighter pilots, biker scouts and Rebel soldiers. Several Star Wars actors appear each weekend for photos and autographs, appearing in a variety of shows hosted in the various theatres around the park, larger Jedi Training Academy classes for younger guests, and other activities. Star Wars Weekends ended its run in 2015.
- ABC Super Soap Weekend was scheduled in November, the event paid tribute to the legions of fans of soap operas from ABC. Guests could meet stars from All My Children, One Life to Live, and General Hospital. The event's final presentation was in November 2008, with ABC instead planning to schedule multiple, smaller regional events around the country for its fans.
- The Osborne Family Spectacle of Dancing Lights (November–January) took over the Streets of America during the Christmas season. The display featured over five million Christmas lights on more than 350 miles (560 km) of wire. The event ended its run in 2015 preceding the demolition of Streets of America.
- Disney Jollywood Nights: A separate-admission seasonal Christmas event introduced in 2023, hosted on selected evenings from 7:30 pm to 12:30 am in November and December.

== Production history ==
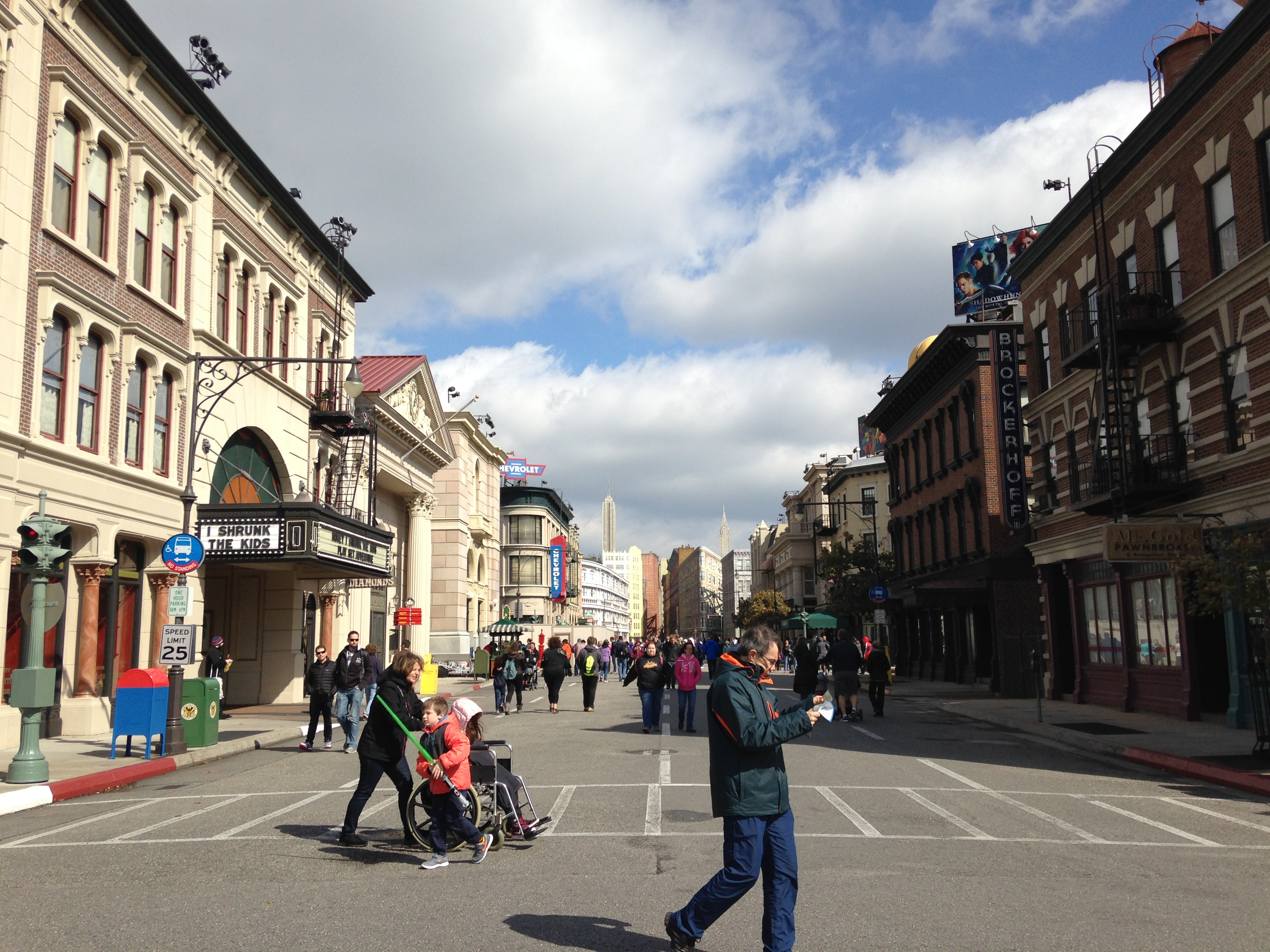
The former Streets of America area was originally a working backlot set with New York City facades and was used in several film productions. A majority of the sets were demolished in 2016.

The Walt Disney Company's original concept of the Disney-MGM Studios was to operate it as a television and motion picture production facility, as well as a theme park. In 1988, among the first feature-length movies filmed at the facility, prior to its completion and opening as a theme park, were Ernest Saves Christmas and Newsies.

When the park opened in 1989, the studio/production facilities housed two major components, the first of which was Walt Disney Feature Animation Florida, where Disney produced projects including Mulan, Lilo & Stitch, Brother Bear, and sequences from other 1990s-early 2000s Disney animated features. The second, larger component was Walt Disney Studios Florida, which consisted of three sound stages used for Disney projects including The Disney Channel's Mickey Mouse Club, Teen Win, Lose or Draw and Adventures in Wonderland. Several third party productions also used the Studios, including Superboy (first season only, from 1988–1989), the 1988–89 season of MTV's Remote Control, Thunder in Paradise, a revival of Let's Make a Deal, special broadcasts of Wheel of Fortune, airplane interior sequences for the feature film Passenger 57, and The Dooley and Pals Show. Music videos, several tapings for World Championship Wrestling (WCW), and live broadcasts of WCW Monday Nitro were also shot there; see WCW Disney tapings. The Post Group had a Florida-based post-production facility located on the Studio lot throughout the 1990s. All these production and post-production facilities were constructed to be an integral part of the theme park's Backstage Studio Tour as well.

A working broadcast radio studio, used by Radio Disney and invited local broadcasters, was also located at the park, behind Sounds Dangerous!

In 2004, Disney management (including CEO Michael Eisner) downsized Disney's Florida operations by closing the animation studio, laying off personnel and then moving the operations to the main animation studio in Burbank, California.

== Attendance ==
Year	Attendance
2011	9,699,000
2012	9,912,000
2013	10,110,000
2014	10,312,000
2015	10,828,000
2016	10,776,000
2017	10,772,000
2018	11,258,000
2019	11,483,000
2020	3,675,000
2021	8,589,000
2022	10,900,000
2023	10,300,000
2024	10,333,000
2025	10,312,000

In 2025, Hollywood Studios was the tenth-most-attended theme park in the world.

== See also ==
- Incidents at Walt Disney World Resort
- Disney Adventure World, similar theme park at Disneyland Paris
- Film industry in Florida
