= The Great Movie Ride =

Former ride at Disney's Hollywood Studios

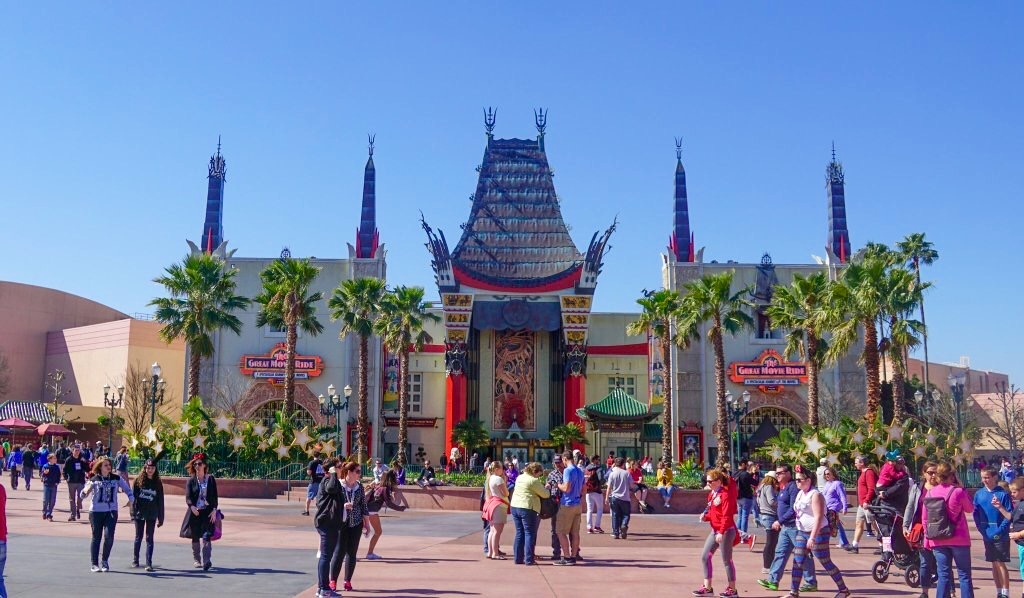

Disney's Hollywood Studios
- Area: Hollywood Boulevard
- Coordinates: 28.356232°N 81.560483°W
- Status: Removed
- Opening date: May 1, 1989
- Closing date: August 13, 2017
- Replaced by: Mickey & Minnie's Runaway Railway

Ride statistics
- Attraction type: Backlot tour dark ride
- Designer: Walt Disney Imagineering
- Theme: Motion picture history
- Music: "Hooray for Hollywood" by Richard A. Whiting (load area only)
- Length: 587 m (1,926 ft)
- Vehicle type: Automated guided vehicles (AGV)
- Vehicles: 2 cars per ride vehicle
- Riders per vehicle: 70
- Rows: 6 per car
- Duration: 22 minutes
- Audio-animatronics: 59
- Sponsors: Coca-Cola (1989–1998); Turner Classic Movies (2015–2017)
- Pre-show host: Robert Osborne (2015–2017)
- FastPass+ was available
- Must transfer from wheelchair
- Assistive listening available

The Great Movie Ride was a dark ride located at Disney's Hollywood Studios at the Walt Disney World Resort in Bay Lake, Florida, United States. Designed by Walt Disney Imagineering, the attraction employed the use of Audio-Animatronic figures, practical sets, live actors, special effects, and projections to recreate iconic scenes from twelve classic films throughout motion picture history. The attraction—which debuted with the park on May 1, 1989—was located inside the park's replica of Grauman's Chinese Theatre, one of Hollywood's most famous movie palaces.

The Great Movie Ride was originally developed by Disney as a cinema-themed pavilion for the Future World section of Epcot. Under the direction of Michael Eisner and Marty Sklar, the concept was expanded into a new theme park devoted to motion pictures that included the dark ride as its centerpiece. To accurately represent a broad spectrum of American film, Disney also incorporated films from outside of its own library, mainly through its licensing agreement with Metro-Goldwyn-Mayer, and later Turner Entertainment. Turner subsidiary, Turner Classic Movies (TCM) sponsored the attraction for the final two years of its operation, with TCM film historian Robert Osborne serving as the attraction's host during that time.

The Great Movie Ride closed on August 13, 2017, becoming the park's last opening-day attraction to permanently close. The attraction was replaced by Mickey & Minnie's Runaway Railway, which still uses the Chinese Theatre replica.

== History ==
The Great Movie Ride directly inspired the creation of Disney's Hollywood Studios. In a Walt Disney Imagineering book, it was revealed that The Great Movie Ride was originally planned as the main attraction in a show business themed pavilion at Epcot, which was to be called "Great Moments at the Movies". However, the newly hired Disney CEO Michael Eisner and WDI president Marty Sklar decided the idea was strong enough to lead an entire new theme park. The idea for the ride was expanded, and the Disney-MGM Studios went into official development. The attraction used the likenesses of numerous living and deceased actors to be recreated as audio-animatronics. Chad Everett provided the voice for John Wayne's figure at the behest of Wayne's family. Lee Marvin's inebriated character of Kid Shelleen from Cat Ballou was planned to be included in the Western segment but was replaced with one of Clint Eastwood, as Marvin's family believed that particular portrayal was inappropriate to showcase.

An early concept was supposed to be called Great Moments at the Movies, presented by Sears Roebuck & Co. The Walt Disney Company and the retailer (then the largest in the world) announced a 10-year joint marketing and licensing agreement on November 19, 1987. Sears would sponsor the park's signature attraction and a Hollywood Showcase Store. However, these plans were scrapped before the park's opening. Coca-Cola stepped in as the attraction's sponsor, and it became The Great Movie Ride to reflect it was a ride, not a movie, despite being housed in a replica of a famous movie theater.

On the park's opening day, Mickey Mouse, Donald Duck, Minnie Mouse, Goofy, Roger Rabbit and other Disney characters placed their signatures, footprints, and handprints in front of the façade of the Great Movie Ride.

Unlike many Disney dark rides that feature separate embarkation and debarkation areas, the Great Movie Ride had only a single combined unloading and loading area. The last people to exit the vehicles often passed the next group of guests waiting to board the vehicles. At the time the ride was designed (the mid to late 1980s), it was common throughout the theme park industry to have all major rides exit into a store selling merchandise associated with the attraction. The Great Movie Ride, however, did not exit directly into a store and instead allowed guests to directly exit back outside into the park.

In 2014, as part of an exclusive programming deal with Disney, Turner Classic Movies agreed to become the sponsor of the attraction. The attraction underwent a refurbishment in 2015, with the addition of a new pre-show and post-show hosted by Robert Osborne, who also provided onboard narration to the ride. The changes were unveiled on May 29, 2015.

On July 15, 2017, it was announced that The Great Movie Ride would be permanently closed in order to make room for its replacement, Mickey & Minnie's Runaway Railway. The attraction had become outdated over the years as the animatronics were starting to age, in addition to Disney's Hollywood Studios changing its theme from show business to popular Hollywood movies. Last rides were given at 9:30 PM on August 13. By the next morning, the signs were taken down and a photo opportunity of Mickey & Minnie's Runaway Railway was installed near the former exit.

There are three references in Mickey & Minnie's Runaway Railway that pay tribute to The Great Movie Ride. A poster that says The Great Moving Ride can be found in the carnival scene between Horace's popcorn stand and Donald's hot dog stand. The tornado scene contains a mailbox with the iconic No Place Like Home quote. Prior to the factory scene, an alley cat sound effect can be heard in the back alley which was also used in The Great Movie Ride.

=== Unrealized plans and proposed attractions ===
Plans called for The Great Movie Ride to be the main attraction for the Disney-MGM Studios Europe theme park, which was scrapped due to the early financial difficulties of the Euro Disneyland Resort. Years later when the resort began turning profits, a show business themed theme park went into development again, and the Walt Disney Studios Park opened in 2002 at the Disneyland Resort Paris, although minus The Great Movie Ride. A show called CinéMagique was built in lieu of the ride.

Three separate attempts were made by Walt Disney Imagineering to bring The Great Movie Ride to California. First were plans to incorporate the attraction into the proposed “Disney-MGM Studio Backlot” project, a 40-acre (160,000 m^{2}) film studio themed retail and entertainment district that was planned (but ultimately never built) for downtown Burbank, California during the late 1980s. Several years later, plans called for the ride to serve as the centerpiece of the proposed Hollywoodland at Disneyland, which would have been added to the park during the planned Disney Decade in the 1990s. For various reasons, however, Hollywoodland was never built. Later, plans called for the ride to be built as part of the Hollywood Pictures Backlot area of the Disney California Adventure theme park at the Disneyland Resort. But budget cuts in the park's original development planning forced the ride's projected cost to be spent on smaller, original and less expensive attractions.

In the late 1980s and early 1990s, Disney was interested in purchasing Jim Henson's Muppets. Walt Disney Imagineering developed a Muppet-themed land for Disney-MGM Studios called Muppet Studios. The land was to feature two main attractions; one was Muppet*Vision 3D and the other was The Great Muppet Movie Ride, a parody of The Great Movie Ride featuring Muppet characters such as Kermit the Frog, Miss Piggy, Fozzie Bear, and Gonzo re-enacting scenes from famous films such as Frankenstein and Peter Pan. However, after Henson died, the deal fell apart and Disney cut back on the Muppet-themed area to just Muppet*Vision 3D.

=== Modifications ===
==== Footlight Parade ====
The first sequence of the ride, Footlight Parade, was plagued with engineering and technical problems from the beginning. When the ride was newly opened, the Footlight Parade segment was different from what it later became. The entire portion following the neon lighted entrance was fleshed out. All the walls leading up to, around, and beyond the "cake" were painted in art deco style patterns as seen in "By a Waterfall". Approximately three "diving boards" with three mannequin "dancers" wearing capes were perched on the right-hand side of the wall as you enter the ride segment. The five-tiered "cake" was prominently displayed at a left-hand turn. It was in the open air illuminated with an array of animated lights. During this pass through the Footlight Parade segment, riders would hear a "loop" of "By a Waterfall" (a song featured in Footlight Parade) lasting approximately 40 seconds as bubbles fall from the ceiling.

For approximately the first year, the "cake" actually rotated and was adorned with water jets as seen in the film. Allegedly, the rotating "cake" mechanism was constantly breaking down, causing frequent repairs and downtime. In addition, the water pumps would constantly fail, flooding the ride path. Park operations believed it was much cheaper and less problematic to leave the "cake" in place with lighting effects used to provide what Imagineers term as "kinetics" to the segment.

When it closed, this segment was still the "opening act" of The Great Movie Ride, but significantly toned down. The guests entered a segment with its lighting significantly diminished. The outer walls were dark with practically no art deco recreations from the film set. The "diving boards" had been replaced with art deco style wall sconces. Instead, guests passed through a deco inspired archway to find themselves facing a large scrim-lined proscenium decorated with gray/blue clouds and remnants of the art deco set designs. Throughout the segment, three large rotating projections of Busby Berkeley-style kaleidoscope dance sequences appeared on the scrim (from By a Waterfall, Dames, and Shadow Waltz). These disappeared to expose the "cake," which was behind the scrim and was simultaneously illuminated with washes of light and reflective water effects. The caped dancers on diving boards were located to the far left of the "cake" behind the scrim. The art deco style wall panels still resided behind the "cake". The looping song segment and bubbles remained.

==== The Wizard of Oz ====
The Wizard of Oz scene did not have major structural changes, but Imagineering replaced the original A-100 Wicked Witch audio-animatronic character with a newer-design figure utilizing Sarcos technology. The Sarcos-equipped audio-animatronics are capable of a great deal more movement possibilities than the original "limited animation" figure designs and can move much more quickly. As a result, they were made much more lifelike.

== Attraction ==
=== Theater facade ===
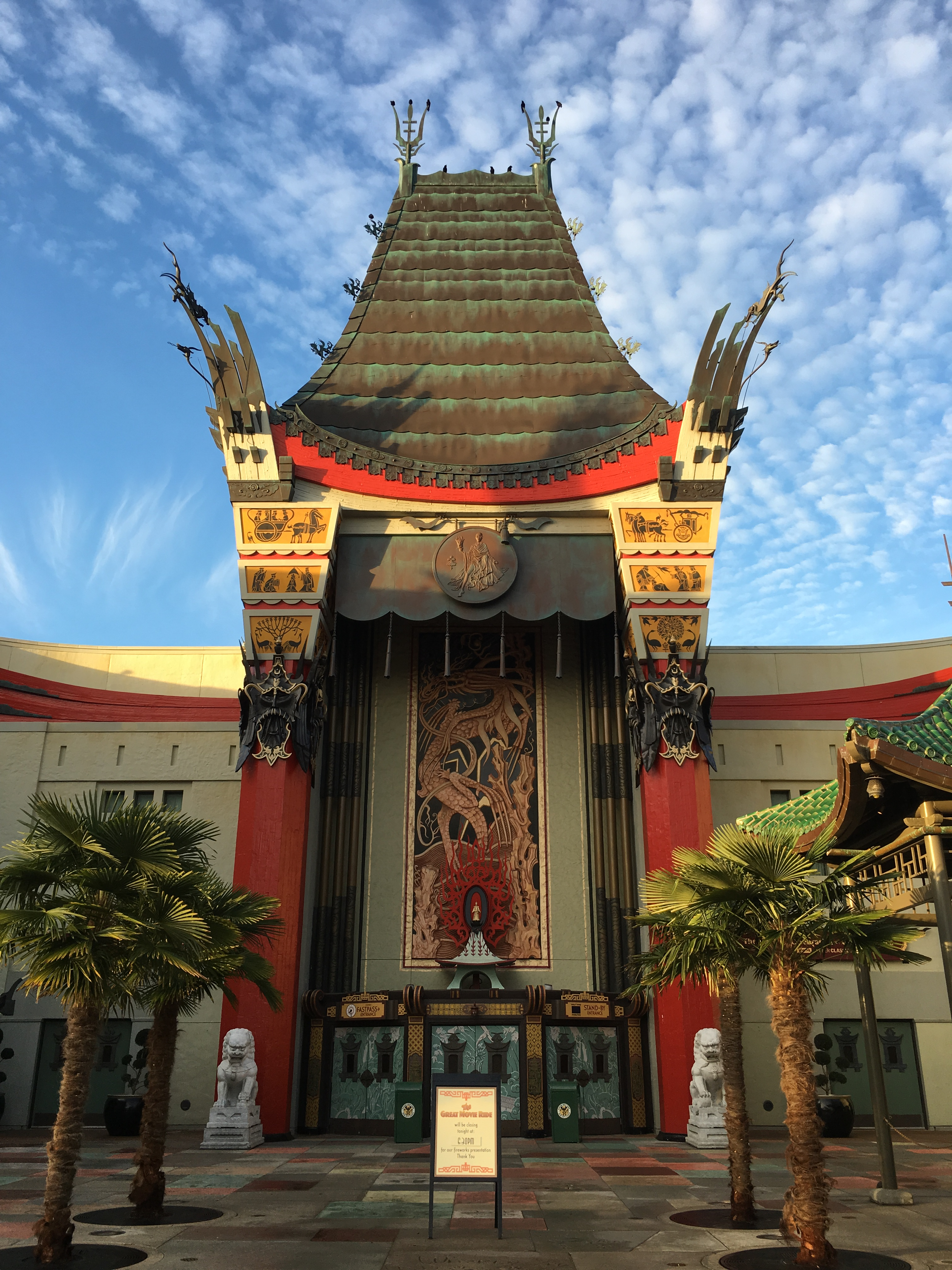
Recreation of the Chinese Theatre

The Great Movie Ride was located inside a recreation of the famous Hollywood landmark, Grauman's Chinese Theatre. The park's Chinese Theatre is a full-scale replica of the original building; Imagineers used the original building's 1927 blueprints in the construction of the park's theatre. At the time the attraction opened, the actual theater's name was "Grauman's Chinese Theatre" and later "Mann's Chinese Theatre", however, the park's proper name for this version of the building is simply "The Chinese Theater". From 2001 to 2015, the theatre façade was obscured from view (when looking from the park's entrance), when the Sorcerer's Hat was situated directly in front of the attraction. The Chinese Theatre facade and courtyard remained after the attraction's closure and was retained for Mickey & Minnie's Runaway Railway.

=== Queue ===
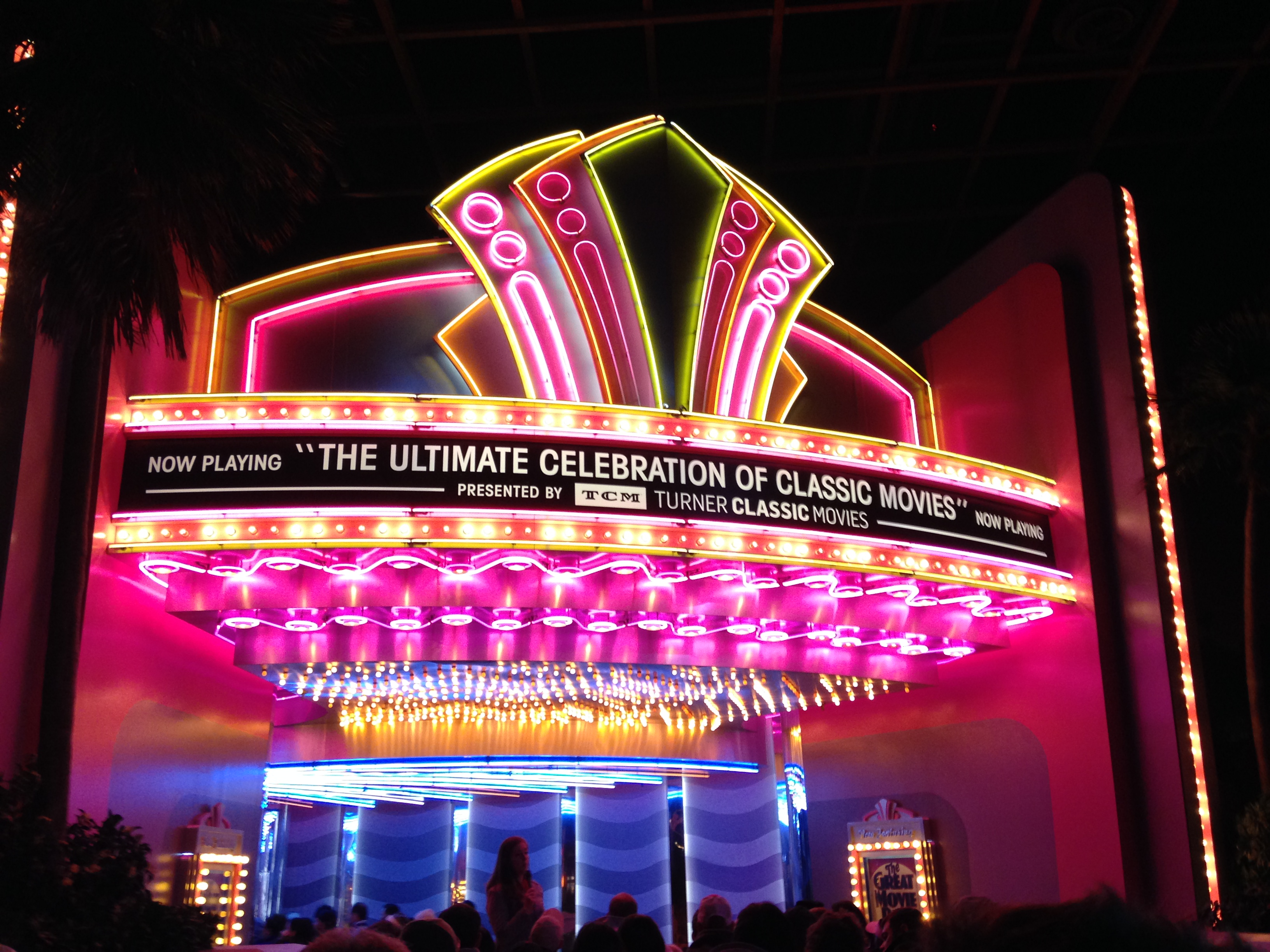
The neon theatre marquee inside of the 1930s-era Hollywood soundstage at the beginning of the ride.

The line wound through a recreation of the Chinese Theatre lobby past glass display cases containing actual costumes, props, and set pieces from various films. The lobby also featured digital posters of various motion pictures. The line then took guests into a small pre-show theatre where Turner Classic Movies host Robert Osborne provided insight and commentary about various motion pictures and film genres—such as musicals, adventure, science-fiction, westerns, romance, and gangster films— including those films that were featured within the ride. The queue line ended at a pair of automatic doors at the front of the theatre that lead into a 1930s era Hollywood soundstage where guests were loaded onto waiting ride vehicles.

=== Ride experience ===
As the guests reach the end of the queue, they entered a 1930s-era Hollywood sound stage where they become loaded by cast members into one of two pairs of open, theatre-style seating ride vehicles. The ride vehicles utilize a "traveling theatre"-style automated guided vehicle ride system similar to the former Universe of Energy attraction at Epcot. However, here the ride vehicles are much smaller in size, are grouped together in pairs of two, and feature an open cab in the first row of the front vehicle for a live tour guide to stand, provide narration, and operate the ride vehicle. Earlier and later in the day, only the second pair of ride vehicles (#2B) are used as the first pair of ride vehicles (#1A) are only used during the busier times of day.

The film set within the soundstage features a large neon theatre marquee and a cyclorama of the 1930s-era Hollywood Hills complete with the original Hollywoodland Sign. As the ride begins, the song "Hooray for Hollywood" plays overhead as the vehicles' tour guide welcomes the guests and introduces Osborne, who informs them (via onboard narration) that they will be taken through scenes from different classic films throughout history.

The first genre of films introduced are musicals, which begins with a cake of starlets from By a Waterfall from Busby Berkeley's Footlight Parade. The next musical scenes include audio-animatronic figures of Don Lockwood (Gene Kelly) swinging from a lamp post from Singin' in the Rain, followed by Mary Poppins (Julie Andrews) and Bert (Dick Van Dyke) singing on the rooftops of London from Mary Poppins.

The next scene is a tribute to gangster films. The ride vehicle passes through the dark and seedy backstreets of a 1930s Chicago and past an audio-animatronic Tom Powers (James Cagney) in a scene from The Public Enemy. When both pairs of ride vehicles are in use, the #1A ride vehicle continues on to the next show scene past a green traffic light above a tunnel entrance while the #2B ride vehicle is stopped when the traffic light changes to red. While stopped, a live gangster named Mugsy (Boy) or Mugsi (Girl) and their audio-animatronic companions Squid and Beans show up and get involved in a shoot-out with rival mobsters (Brains, Legs, and Weasel) in a car on the opposite side of the street where the ride vehicle is stopped. During the shootout, the live gangster then chases the tour guide and hijacks the ride vehicle.

Next, the ride vehicle enters into a tribute to the Western genre. Here, the guests encounter audio-animatronics of the Man with No Name (Clint Eastwood) standing outside of a saloon and Ethan Edwards (John Wayne) sitting atop his horse. A sign on one building facade reads “Ransom Stoddard Attorney-at-Law” (James Stewart). The #2B ride vehicle (which is already being driven by the gangster) continues past a shootout between the town sheriff and an audio-animatronic bank robber named Snake. The gangster ignores the shootout and continues on to the next scene. However, the #1A ride vehicle (which is still being driven by the tour guide) stops in front of the town bank while a bank robbery is in progress. Suddenly, a live bank robber named Kate Durango (Girl) or Kid Carson (Boy) appears from inside the bank. After getting into a shoot-out with the town sheriff and chasing the tour guide into the bank, the bandit sets the town bank ablaze with dynamite and hijacks the ride vehicle. Following this scene, the remainder of the attraction is the same for both the #1A and #2B ride vehicles.

Next, the ride vehicle continues into a darkened corridor of a seemingly abandoned spaceship, revealing itself to be the Nostromo, the doomed vessel from Alien. The ride vehicle passes an audio-animatronic Ellen Ripley (Sigourney Weaver) holding a flamethrower as she prepares to confront a creature lurking within the ship. Guests could also hear Jones, Ripley's pet cat, meowing in the darkness, as well as the Nostromo's "Mother" computer warning of an imminent ship self-destruction countdown. Hearing this, the gangster or the bandit becomes nervous and speeds the ride vehicle through the ship, but not before a Xenomorph appears and attacks the guests, popping out from both the ceiling and the wall.

The ride vehicle next enters a scene set in an ancient Egyptian tomb filled with snakes. Osborne informs the guests that they are in a scene from Raiders of the Lost Ark as audio-animatronic figures of Indiana Jones (Harrison Ford) and Sallah (John Rhys-Davies) struggle to lift the Ark of the Covenant. A second room within the temple features a large altar in the form of the ancient Egyptian god Anubis. Near the top of the altar, a large priceless jewel is being watched over by a cloaked temple guard. The gangster or the bandit sees the jewel, stops the ride vehicle, and disembarkes to take it. Before touching the jewel, the temple guard gives a warning that those who disturb the treasure of the gods must pay with their life. Ignoring the warning, the gangster or the bandit reaches to grab the jewel. Suddenly, a plume of fiery smoke shoots from the ground engulfing the temple altar (as the temple guard leaves, undressing to reveal that the temple guard is the original tour guide while doing so before reappearing from the shadows). When the smoke clears out, the skeletal corpse of the Gangster or Bandit is revealed and the tour guide reboards the ride vehicle and continues on with the show.

The next film genre introduced are horror films as the ride vehicle goes through an ancient burial chamber full of mummies, some of which have come to life. The ride vehicle soon departs the tomb and enters a dense jungle. Here, audio-animatronic figures of Tarzan (Johnny Weissmuller) swinging on a vine, Jane (Maureen O'Sullivan) sitting atop Timba the elephant, and Cheeta the chimpanzee can be seen. The ride vehicle then moves past the final scene from Casablanca, featuring audio-animatronics of Rick Blaine (Humphrey Bogart) and Ilsa Lund (Ingrid Bergman) as they stand in front of a waiting airplane. Next, the ride vehicle passes a film projection of Mickey Mouse in his role as the Sorcerer's Apprentice from the 1940 Walt Disney's animated film, Fantasia.

The ride vehicle then enters into the Munchkinland scene from The Wizard of Oz, where Dorothy's house has landed on the Wicked Witch of the East. When both the #1A and #2B ride vehicles are in use, they meet up here and come to a stop in the middle of the scene. Audio-Animatronic Munchkins begin to appear from various places and sing as they welcome guests to their home. However, a plume of smoke suddenly rises from the ground as an audio-animatronic Wicked Witch of the West (Margaret Hamilton) appears and asks who is responsible for killing the Wicked Witch of the East. The tour guide aboard the #1A ride vehicle briefly interacts with her before she disappears in another puff of smoke. The Munchkins reappear from their hiding places and begin to sing again as both ride vehicles follow the Yellow Brick Road out of Munchkinland past audio-animatronic figures of Dorothy (Judy Garland), Scarecrow (Ray Bolger), Tin Man (Jack Haley), Cowardly Lion (Bert Lahr) and Toto (Terry) standing in front of the Emerald City, and onto the ride's grand finale.

For the grand finale, when both the #1A and #2B ride vehicles are in use, they both enter a dark theatre where they line up side by side and come to a stop in front of a large movie screen. There, Osborne or the tour guide concludes the tour with a three-minute film montage of classic film moments. At the conclusion of the film, the tour guide, who is applauded by the guests, declares the tour a success, and both ride vehicles exit the theater in single file to return to the 1930s soundstage, where the ride concludes.

== Films represented ==
- Film: Studio
Footlight Parade	Warner Bros.
Singin' in the Rain	MGM
Mary Poppins	Disney
The Public Enemy	Warner Bros.
The Good, the Bad and the Ugly	United Artists
The Searchers	Warner Bros.
Alien	20th Century Fox
Raiders of the Lost Ark	Paramount / Lucasfilm
Tarzan and His Mate	MGM
Casablanca	Warner Bros.
Fantasia	Disney
The Wizard of Oz	MGM

=== Licensing rights ===
Disney arranged separate licensing deals with various studios to represent the different characters and settings featured in the attraction. Most of the non-Disney films represented in The Great Movie Ride were produced by and/or owned by Metro-Goldwyn-Mayer when the ride's operation began. In 1985, Disney and MGM entered into a licensing contract that gave Disney worldwide rights to use the MGM name and logo for what would become Disney-MGM Studios (now known as Disney's Hollywood Studios), while separate contracts were used for The Wizard of Oz, Casablanca, Singin' in the Rain, The Good, the Bad and the Ugly, The Public Enemy, Tarzan and His Mate and Footlight Parade to give these films representation in The Great Movie Ride. Disney's license for the aforementioned films continued with Turner Entertainment until the attraction's closure.

The Great Movie Ride also included Alien, owned by 20th Century Fox, as Disney originally acquired the licensing rights to the film for a different attraction, which was ultimately cancelled. Disney, however, retained the rights to use Alien and decided to incorporate it into the Great Movie Ride. In addition to Fox, scenes from almost all of the major film studios were presented in the film montage with one notable exception; there was no reference to any motion picture released by Universal Pictures, whose parent company operates the rival Universal Orlando Resort, although Shakespeare in Love, which was produced by Miramax and distributed by Universal internationally, was featured in the montage.

=== Final set of films in finale ===
In alphabetical order:

- 10
- 2001: A Space Odyssey
- 42nd Street
- The Absent-Minded Professor
- Adam's Rib
- The Adventures of Robin Hood
- Airplane!
- Aladdin
- Alien
- All About Eve
- Amadeus
- An American in Paris
- Anchors Aweigh
- Armageddon
- Arsenic and Old Lace
- Arthur
- Babes in Arms
- The Band Wagon
- Behind the Screen
- Ben-Hur
- Beverly Hills Cop
- Big
- The Birth of a Nation
- The Black Pirate
- Blazing Saddles
- Braveheart
- The Bridge on the River Kwai
- Bright Eyes
- Broadcast News
- Butch Cassidy and the Sundance Kid
- Cabaret
- Cabin in the Sky
- Camille
- Casablanca
- Chariots of Fire
- Chicago
- The Chronicles of Narnia: The Lion, the Witch and the Wardrobe
- Citizen Kane
- Cocktail
- Cocoon
- Cops
- Crocodile Dundee
- The Cure
- David Copperfield
- The Defiant Ones
- The Dentist
- Dirty Dancing
- Doctor Zhivago
- Down and Out in Beverly Hills
- Fantasia
- Fatal Attraction
- Finding Nemo
- Follow the Fleet
- Footlight Parade
- Forbidden Paradise
- Forrest Gump
- The French Connection
- From Here to Eternity
- Frozen
- Funny Girl
- Gentlemen Prefer Blondes
- Giant
- Gilda
- The Godfather
- The Godfather Part II
- The Gold Rush
- Good Morning, Vietnam
- The Great Train Robbery
- Grease
- The Great Escape
- Gone with the Wind
- Grand Hotel
- The Grapes of Wrath
- Guardians of the Galaxy
- High Noon
- High Society
- Honey, I Shrunk the Kids
- Hud
- The Incredibles
- Independence Day
- It Happened One Night
- It's a Wonderful Life
- Jailhouse Rock
- The Jazz Singer
- The Karate Kid
- King Kong
- The Kiss
- Klute
- Lady and the Tramp
- Lassie Come Home
- The Last Emperor
- Lawrence of Arabia
- Lethal Weapon
- The Lion King
- The Live Ghost
- Malcolm X
- Marathon Man
- Mary Poppins
- The Matrix
- Million Dollar Mermaid
- Mission: Impossible
- Never Say Never Again
- A Night at the Opera
- A Nightmare on Elm Street
- North by Northwest
- Notorious
- Our Dancing Daughters
- Pal Joey
- Patton
- Pearl Harbor
- Pirates of the Caribbean: The Curse of the Black Pearl
- A Place in the Sun
- Platoon
- A Plumbing We Will Go
- Poltergeist
- Pretty Woman
- The Public Enemy
- Queen Christina
- Raiders of the Lost Ark
- Rambo: First Blood Part II
- Return of the Jedi
- The Rink
- Risky Business
- Roman Holiday
- Royal Wedding
- San Francisco
- Saturday Night Fever
- The Searchers
- The Seven Year Itch
- Shakespeare in Love
- Shampoo
- Shanghai Knights
- The Sheik
- Shine
- Show Boat
- Silkwood
- Singin' in the Rain
- Sister Act
- Snow White and the Seven Dwarfs
- Some Like It Hot
- The Sound of Music
- Stagecoach
- Star Trek II: The Wrath of Khan
- Star Trek VI: The Undiscovered Country
- Star Wars
- Star Wars: The Force Awakens
- Steamboat Willie
- A Streetcar Named Desire
- Sunset Boulevard
- Swing Time
- Take the Money and Run
- Tangled
- Taxi Driver
- The Ten Commandments
- The Ten Commandments
- The Terminator
- Terms of Endearment
- Thelma & Louise
- Three Men and a Baby
- The Three Musketeers
- Top Gun
- Tootsie
- Toy Story
- Trading Places
- True Grit
- Unforgiven
- The Way We Were
- Who Framed Roger Rabbit
- Wings
- The Wizard of Oz
- Wuthering Heights
- Yankee Doodle Dandy
- Young Frankenstein

== Props ==
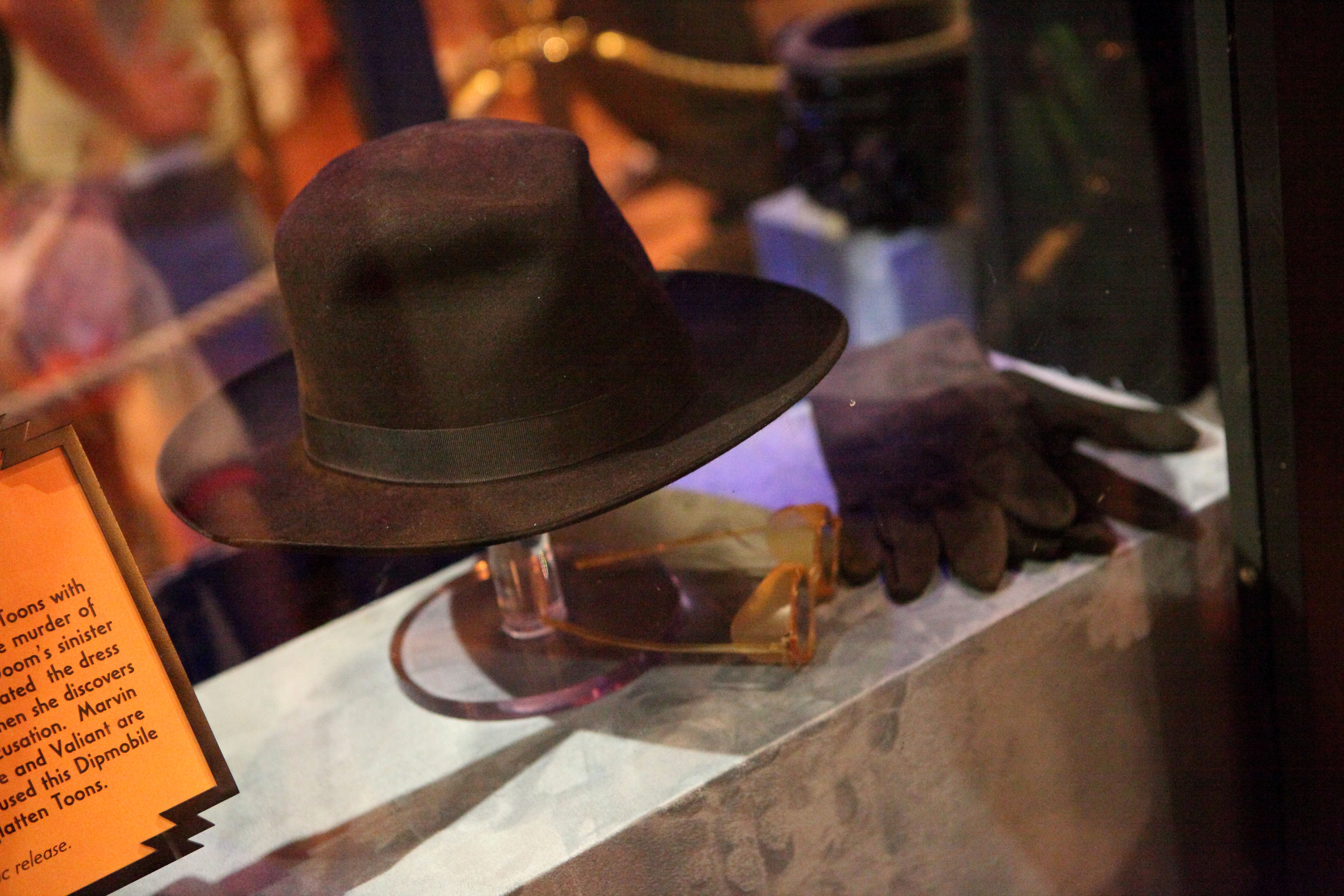
Judge Doom hat, gloves and glasses from the film Who Framed Roger Rabbit.

The Lockheed Model 12 Electra Junior plane, is often claimed to be the actual plane used during the filming of Casablanca, but no full-size plane was actually used during the filming of Casablanca. The back half of this plane was cut off and can be found resting along the shoreline of the Jungle Cruise attraction at the Magic Kingdom.

=== Notable props most recently residing in the queue ===
- Wardrobe pieces and miniature scale props from Who Framed Roger Rabbit.
- The Dejarik board used aboard the Millennium Falcon in the original Star Wars.
- Freddy Krueger's red and green striped sweater from A Nightmare on Elm Street 2: Freddy's Revenge.
- Alex Delarge's hat from A Clockwork Orange.
- Rose's dress from Titanic.
- Veronica's (played by Judy Garland) dress from In the Good Old Summertime.
- The Ark of the Covenant from Raiders of the Lost Ark.

=== Props that formerly resided in the queue ===
- Indiana Jones' machete and monkey heads from Indiana Jones and the Temple of Doom.
- The ruby slippers from The Wizard of Oz (Another pair is in the National Museum of American History administered by the Smithsonian).
- The dip machine model and bullet case from Who Framed Roger Rabbit (from 1988).
- Spacesuit and various props from the films Alien and Armageddon.
- Sam's piano from Casablanca.
- A dress worn by Maria in The Sound of Music.
- The title object from Cocoon.
- The model Nautilus submarine and a dive suit from Disney's 20,000 Leagues Under the Sea.
- Susan's costume from The Chronicles of Narnia: The Lion, the Witch and the Wardrobe.
- A green peacock Elizabethan dress worn by Judi Dench in Shakespeare in Love.
- Mary Poppins' carousel horse from the film of the same name.
- Fiona's (played by Cyd Charisse) dress from Brigadoon.

== List of imprints in forecourt ==
Much like the real one in Hollywood, the Chinese Theatre located inside Disney's Hollywood Studios features handprints, shoe prints and signatures of actors, musicians and film characters that still remain today, after Mickey & Minnie's Runaway Railway replaced The Great Movie Ride.

- Ann-Margret (August 31, 1994)
- Eddie Albert (September 21, 1990)
- Alan Alda (1988)
- June Allyson (August 21, 1989)
- Harry Anderson (April 29, 1989)
- Lauren Bacall (April 29, 1989)
- Warren Beatty (August 19, 1990)
- Robby Benson (December 29, 1991)
- Pat Boone (November 3, 1989)
- Carol Burnett (June 25, 1988)
- George Burns (May 1, 1989)
- LeVar Burton (May 1999)
- C-3PO and R2-D2 (December 20, 1989)
- Carol Channing (February 9, 1993)
- Cyd Charisse (May 10, 1989)
- Chevy Chase (March 24, 1990)
- Dick Clark (June 1, 1990)
- Jackie Cooper (November 21, 1988)
- David Copperfield (January 4, 1994)
- Tom Cruise (April 9, 1989)
- Macaulay Culkin (February 22, 1991)
- Tony Curtis (March 27, 1992)
- Geena Davis (June 10, 1992)
- Rebecca De Mornay (1991)
- Danny DeVito (June 17, 1990)
- Gérard Depardieu (December 10, 1996)
- Neil Diamond (February 1993)
- Phyllis Diller (1989)
- Donald Duck (May 1, 1989)
- Patty Duke (March 28, 1993)
- Douglas Fairbanks Jr. (October 10, 1990)
- Jamie Farr (May 25, 1996)
- Harrison Ford (January 9, 1991)
- John Forsythe
- Michael J. Fox (May 29, 1999)
- Annette Funicello (May 1, 1989)
- Dorothy Gale's ruby slippers (worn by Judy Garland)
- Estelle Getty (April 17, 1989)
- Bobcat Goldthwait (December 28, 1990)
- Goofy (May 1, 1989)
- Louis Gossett Jr. (April 6, 1989)
- Elliott Gould (December 29, 1989)
- Mark Hamill (January 13, 1990)
- Daryl Hannah (February 13, 1989)
- Glenne Headly (June 14, 1990)
- Jim Henson and Kermit the Frog (August 28, 1989)
- Audrey Hepburn (April 29, 1989) (Note: Hepburn's handprints are exclusive to the theme park's Chinese Theatre; she declined a request from the original Grauman's Chinese Theatre after she created her handprints for the park.)
- Pee-Wee Herman (February 13, 1989)
- Charlton Heston (December 7, 1995)
- Dustin Hoffman (June 14, 1990)
- Hulk Hogan (November 9, 1993)
- Bob Hope (May 1, 1989)
- Ernie Hudson (1998)
- Kate Jackson (April 16, 1989)
- Michael Jackson (January 13, 1990)
- Samuel L. Jackson (March 3, 1995)
- Billy Joel and Christie Brinkley (March 20, 1990)
- Van Johnson (October 26, 1995)
- George Kennedy (December 23, 1991)
- Charlie Korsmo (June 19, 1990)
- Dorothy Lamour (September 12, 1990)
- Michael Landon (July 13, 1988)
- Angela Lansbury (November 2, 1991)
- Jerry Lewis (April 10, 1996)
- Ray Liotta (February 18, 1995)
- George Lucas (August 26, 1989)
- Steve Martin (1991)
- Rue McClanahan (April 17, 1989)
- Ed McMahon (June 15, 1992)
- Bette Midler (1989)
- Ann Miller (August 8, 1991)
- Liza Minnelli (March 20, 1990)
- Mary Tyler Moore (May 8, 1993)
- Rick Moranis (April 30, 1989)
- Pat Morita (August 23, 1991)
- Mickey Mouse (May 1, 1989)
- Minnie Mouse (May 1, 1989)
- Leonard Nimoy (1989)
- Donald O'Connor (November 18, 1991)
- Maureen O'Sullivan (February 21, 1992)
- Jack Palance (January 15, 1997)
- Regis Philbin and Kathie Lee Gifford (October 2, 1991)
- Jane Powell (August 30, 1989)
- Jason Priestley (June 22, 1991)
- Roger Rabbit (May 1, 1989)
- Tony Randall (April 16, 1989)
- Burt Reynolds (June 23, 1988)
- John Ritter
- The Rocketeer (June 21, 1991)
- Jane Russell (February 8, 1992)
- Susan Sarandon (March 21, 1999)
- Charlie Sheen (September 17, 1994)
- Martin Short (November 1, 1991)
- Suzanne Somers (April 15, 1989)
- Sally Jo Sousa (October 22, 1996)
- Sissy Spacek
- Sylvester Stallone (December 13, 1990)
- Sally Struthers
- Lily Tomlin (December 3, 1994)
- John Travolta (June 18, 1989)
- Cicely Tyson (April 29, 1989)
- Dick Van Dyke (April 14, 1989)
- Jim Varney
- Patrick Wayne (April 29, 1989)
- Betty White (February 24, 1990)
- Cindy Williams (June 25, 1988)
- Robin Williams (December 28, 1990)

== See also ==
- List of films considered the best
