= List of Disney's Hollywood Studios attractions =

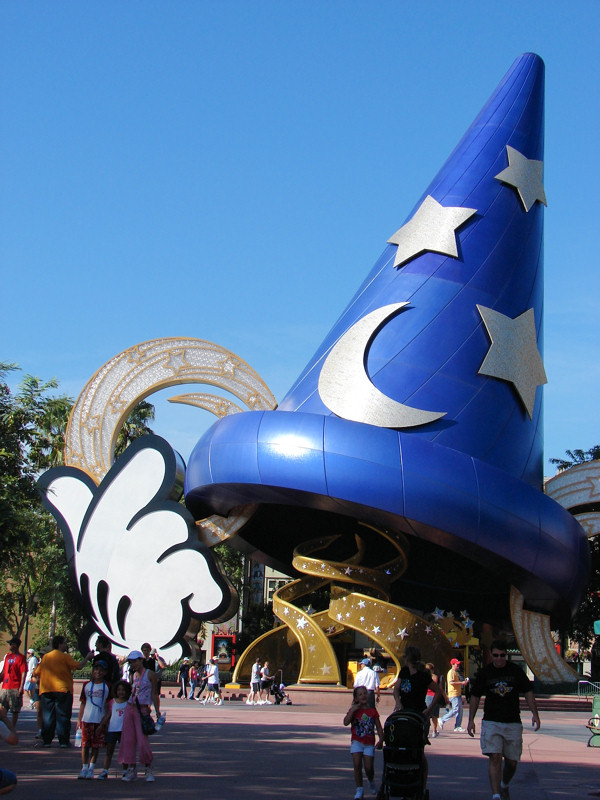
The Sorcerer's Hat, the former icon of Disney's Hollywood Studios, at the end of Hollywood Boulevard

Disney's Hollywood Studios is a theme park located at the Walt Disney World Resort. Major attractions are listed below.

== Hollywood Boulevard ==
Hollywood Boulevard is lined with shops selling Disney merchandise and food. While parades are a major attraction today, the area was not originally built to handle parades, and an appropriate sound system and other facilities had to be retrofitted after initial construction. Michael Eisner, who had a major part in the park's creation ever since the earliest development, wanted the opening land to operate on the same principle as Main Street, U.S.A. — a street lined with shops and food, but in a style more fitting to Hollywood.

- Mickey & Minnie's Runaway Railway, a trackless dark ride, which inside the park's Chinese Theatre, based on the Mickey Mouse animated shorts, as well as the first Mickey Mouse-themed ride-through attraction in the history of Disney theme parks.

== Echo Lake ==
- Star Tours – The Adventures Continue, a 3D motion simulator ride, set in the Star Wars universe. It is the refurbished successor to the park's original attraction.
- Indiana Jones Epic Stunt Spectacular!, a live-action movie stunt performance re-enacting various scenes from the film, Raiders of the Lost Ark, in the Stunt Theater.
- For the First Time in Forever: A Frozen Sing-Along Celebration, a musical stage show retelling the story of the film in Hyperion Theater.
- Vacation Fun: An Original Animated Short with Mickey & Minnie, a short film shown in a Mickey Mouse themed venue, followed by a photo-op post-show.

== Monstropolis (Opening in 2027) ==
- Monster, Inc. Door Coaster, an indoor suspended roller coaster themed around into the Door Vault.
- Welcome to Monstropolis, a live performance in The Glob Theater, based on Monsters, Inc..

== Star Wars: Galaxy's Edge ==
- Star Wars: Millennium Falcon – Smugglers Run
- Star Wars: Rise of the Resistance

== Toy Story Land ==
- Toy Story Mania!, an interactive 3D shooting gallery featuring characters from the Toy Story films.
- Slinky Dog Dash, a family-friendly rollercoaster themed around Slinky Dog. The story goes that Andy used his "Mega Coaster Play Kit" to build around his backyard, and then put Slinky Dog on the track.
- Alien Swirling Saucers: Lilypad's Jams, an attraction similar to Mater's Junkyard Jamboree at Disney California Adventure, themed around the Claw and Little Green Aliens.

== The Walt Disney Studios Lot ==
- The Little Mermaid – A Musical Adventure, a live performance in Animation Courtyard theater until the renamed Studio Theater, featuring The Little Mermaid.
- Walt Disney Presents, a museum-like walk-through attraction that explores Walt Disney's life and legacy through photos, models, rare artifacts, and a short biographical film narrated by Julie Andrews.
- The Magic of Disney Animation, a short presentation showing how animated films are made. At Animation Academy, guests could take drawing classes from one of the Disney artists and learn to draw Disney characters such as Mickey, Donald, Goofy, Pluto, Winnie the Pooh, Stitch and Jiminy Cricket. In July 2025, it was announced the attraction would reopen on September 14, 2026 with new renovations.
- Disney Jr. Mickey Mouse Clubhouse Live!, a live performance in Stage 1 Theater, inspired by Mickey Mouse Clubhouse and the revival.

== Sunset Boulevard ==
- The Twilight Zone Tower of Terror is a thrill ride which drops guests in an elevator in a randomized set of four sequences, each involving multiple high speed drops and ascents.
- Rock 'n' Roller Coaster Starring The Muppets is an indoor roller coaster with three inversions and a high-speed launch in the fictional G-Force Records.
- Beauty and the Beast – Live on Stage, a simplified version of the film. Appeared on Hollywood Boulevard until the Theater of the Stars moved to Sunset Boulevard in July 1994.
- Fantasmic! – held in the Hollywood Hills Amphitheater, this live show serves as the park's nighttime spectacular; however, due to inclement weather and other scheduling situations, it is not held every night.

== Entertainment ==
The park's original logo and name from 1989 to 2008.

=== Theater of the Stars ===
Originally located off Hollywood Boulevard (1989-1993) and relocated to Sunset Boulevard (1994-present)

- Hollywood! Hollywood! A Star-Studded Spectacular (May 1 – August 31, 1989)
- Dick Tracy starring in Diamond Double-Cross (May 21, 1990 – February 16, 1991)
- Hollywood's Pretty Woman (September 24 – November 3, 1991)
- Beauty and the Beast – Live on Stage (1991 – 1993; July 15, 1994 – March 15, 2020; August 15, 2021 – present)
- Used for seasonal special events:
  - Star Wars Weekends, etc. (2015)
  - The Music of Pixar Live! (May 26 – August 27, 2017)
  - Disney Socienty Orchestra and Friends (August 2 – October 3, 2020)
  - Disney Holidays in Hollywood (November 11 – present; seasonals)

The theater is also used for occasional corporate, seasonal, promotional and internal events, and presentations.

=== Hyperion Theater (Soundstage 10) ===
Formerly known as SuperStar Television Theater (1989–1998; 2009–2014) and ABC TV Theater (1999–2008)

- SuperStar Television (May 1, 1989 – September 26, 1998)
- Doug Live! (March 15, 1999 – May 12, 2001)
- Get Happy...With ABC! (July 1 – October 5, 2002)
- The American Idol Experience (February 14, 2009 – August 30, 2014)
- For the First Time in Forever: A Frozen Sing-Along Celebration (June 17, 2015 – present)
- What’s This? Tim Burton’s The Nightmare Before Christmas Sing-Along (November 11 – present; seasonals)

=== Mickey Shorts Theater (Soundstage 11) ===
Formerly known as Monster Sound Studio (1989–1997) and ABC Sound Studio (1997–2012)

- The Monster Sound Show (May 1, 1989 – June 30, 1997)
- One Saturday Morning Sound Show (July 1, 1997 – February 20, 1999)
- Sounds Dangerous! (April 22, 1999 – January 4, 2009, seasonally until May 18, 2012)
- Jedi Training Academy Sign-Up/Carbon Freeze Me (2012–2015)
- Star Wars: Path of the Jedi (December 4, 2015 – May 14, 2018)
- Mickey & Minnie in Vacation Fun (March 4, 2020 – present)

=== Epic Theater ===
- Indiana Jones Epic Stunt Spectacular! (August 25, 1989 – March 12, 2020; December 19, 2021 – present)

=== Grand Arts Theatre ===
This entertainment venue is no longer operating as it has been demolished for Monstropolis.

- Muppet*Vision 3D (May 16, 1991 – June 7, 2025)

=== The Glob Theater (Opening in 2027) ===
- Welcome to Monstropolis

=== Hollywood Boulevard ===
- High School Musical Pep Rally (January 22 – September 14, 2007)
- High School Musical 2: School's Out (September 23, 2007 – September 13, 2008)
- High School Musical 3: Right Here! Right Now! (October 24, 2008 – October 2, 2010)
- Disney Channel Rocks! (October 22, 2010 – April 6, 2013)
- March of the First Order (May 4, 2016 – July 6, 2019)
- Glisten! (November 9, 2024 – present; seasonal)

=== New York Street ===
This entertainment venue is no longer operating as it has been demolished for Star Wars: Galaxy's Edge

- Teenage Mutant Ninja Turtles (July 1, 1990 – May 31, 1995)
- Muppets on Location: The Days of Swine & Roses (September 16, 1991 – January 23, 1994)
- Ace Ventura: Pet Detective – Live in Action (November 10, 1995 – ? 1996)
- Goosebumps HorrorLand Fright Show and Funhouse (October 8, 1997 – November 1, 1998)
- Mulch! Sweat and Shears! (2004–15)

=== Premier Theater ===
Formerly known as Backlot Theater (1993-2002). This entertainment venue is no longer operating as it has been demolished for Star Wars: Galaxy's Edge

- Beauty and the Beast – Live on Stage (1993–1994; built on a temporary basis while Theater of the Stars was being constructed)
- The Spirit of Pocahontas (June 23, 1995 – February 24, 1996)
- The Hunchback of Notre Dame – A Musical Adventure (June 21, 1996 – September 28, 2002)
- Used for seasonal special events: Star Wars Weekends, etc. (January 2008 – July 5, 2014)
- For the First Time in Forever: A Frozen Sing-Along Celebration (July 5, 2014 – June 16, 2015)

=== Soundstages 2 & 3 ===
Originally a portion of the Disney-MGM Studios Backstage Studio Tour (1989-1990), Inside the Magic (1990-1996), Backstage Pass (1996-2000). This entertainment venue is no longer operating as it closed to make room for Toy Story Mania!, which became part of Toy Story Land

- Who Wants to Be a Millionaire – Play It! (April 7, 2001 – August 19, 2006)

=== Soundstage 4 ===
Originally a portion of the Disney-MGM Studios Backstage Studio Tour (1989-1990), Inside the Magic (1990-1996). This entertainment venue is no longer operating as it has been demolished to make room for the entrance of Toy Story Land

- The Haunted Mansion (October 8, 2003 – May 1, 2004)
- Journey into Narnia: Creating The Lion, the Witch, and the Wardrobe (December 9, 2005 – January 1, 2008)
- Journey into Narnia: Prince Caspian (June 27, 2008 – September 10, 2011)
- The Legend Of Captain Jack Sparrow (December 6, 2012 – November 6, 2014)

=== Walt Disney Theatre ===
Originally a portion of the Disney-MGM Studios Backstage Studio Tour (1989-1990), Inside the Magic (1990-1994)

- Making of:
  - The Lion King (1994–1995)
  - Pocahontas: A Legend Comes to Life (June 23, 1995)
  - Toy Story (November 22, 1995 – June 22, 1996)
  - The Hunchback of Notre Dame (premiered 1996)
  - Evita (January 10 – July 13, 1997)
  - George of the Jungle (July 14 – November 20, 1997)
  - Flubber (November 21, 1997 – January 1998)
  - Armageddon (July 1, 1998 – June 1999)
- Walt Disney: One Man's Dream / Walt Disney Presents (Oct 1, 2001 – present)

=== Animation Courtyard Theater (Soundstage 16) ===
Formerly known as Walt Disney Theater and was originally the final portion of the Disney-MGM Studios Backstage Studio Tour (1989-1990). This building was originally soundstage 15 until Rock 'n' Roller Coaster opened with its show building labeled as soundstage 15. The Animation Courtyard Theater then became soundstage 16 around 1999. This entertainment venue is no longer operating as it closed to make room for The Little Mermaid – A Musical Adventure, which became part of The Walt Disney Studios.

- Here Come the Muppets (May 25, 1990 – September 2, 1991)
- Voyage of the Little Mermaid (January 7, 1992 – March 15, 2020)

=== Studio Theater ===
- The Little Mermaid – A Musical Adventure (May 27, 2025 – present)

=== Soundstage Theater (Soundstage 5) ===
This entertainment venue is no longer operating as it closed to make room for Disney Jr. Mickey Mouse Clubhouse Live!, which became part of The Walt Disney Studios.

- Soundstage Restaurant (May 1, 1989 – November 14, 1998; featured sets over the years from Big Business, Beauty and the Beast and Aladdin)
- Bear in the Big Blue House – Live on Stage (June 7, 1999 – August 4, 2001)
- Playhouse Disney – Live on Stage!
  - (October 1, 2001 – April 3, 2005; consisted of Bear in the Big Blue House, Rolie Polie Olie, Stanley, and The Book of Pooh)
  - (April 11, 2005 – January 1, 2008; consisted of Bear in the Big Blue House, JoJo's Circus, Stanley, and The Book of Pooh)
  - (February 1, 2008 – January 29, 2011; consisted of Mickey Mouse Clubhouse, Handy Manny, Little Einsteins, and My Friends Tigger & Pooh)
- Disney Jr. – Live on Stage!
  - (March 4, 2011 – January 13, 2013; consisted of Mickey Mouse Clubhouse, Handy Manny, Little Einsteins, and Jake and the Never Land Pirates)
  - (February 15, 2013 – September 1, 2018; consisted of Mickey Mouse Clubhouse, Sofia the First, Doc McStuffins, and Jake and the Never Land Pirates)
- Disney Jr. Play and Dance!
  - (December 22, 2018 – May 25, 2025; September 2, – September 25, 2025; consisted of Mickey and the Roadster Racers, Vampirina, Doc McStuffins, and The Lion Guard)
- Get Animated!
  - (May 27 – September 1, 2025)

=== Stage 1 Theater ===
- Disney Jr. Mickey Mouse Clubhouse Live! (May 26, 2026 – present)

=== Once Upon a Studio Theater ===
- Once Upon a Studio (September 14, 2026 – present)

=== Sunset Showcase Theater ===
- Club Disney (December 5, 2015 – February 6, 2016)
  - Club Villain (January 16, 2016 – October 31, 2017; seasonals)
- Lightning McQueen's Racing Academy (March 31, 2019 – October 7, 2024)
- Disney Villains: Unfairly Ever After (May 27, 2025 – present)

=== Hollywood Hills Amphitheater ===
- Fantasmic! (October 15, 1998 – March 15, 2020; November 3, 2022 – present)

=== Nighttime entertainment ===
==== Current ====
- Fantasmic! (October 15, 1998 – March 15, 2020; November 3, 2022 – present) – This nighttime spectacle with mist projection screens, fireworks, water fountains, pyrotechnics, and Disney characters has drawn record numbers of guests to the park. The show was updated with new animation and live-action sequences when it returned on November 3, 2022.
- Jingle Bell, Jingle BAM! (November 14, 2016 – January 5, 2020; November 11, 2023 – present) – A seasonal holiday-themed fireworks and projection mapping display featuring fireworks, projection mapping, lasers, artificial snow, and searchlights, with a story based on the Prep & Landing franchise. On June 15, 2023, Disney's Hollywood Studios announced that the revamped version of the holiday shows will return in a new holiday event, Disney Jollywood Nights at Walt Disney World Resort, as part of the Disney 100 Years of Wonder celebration.
- Disney Movie Magic (2017–19; 2021–present) – A projection mapping show themed to Walt Disney Studios' live-action films, including Beauty and the Beast, Mary Poppins, The Jungle Book, Pirates of the Caribbean, Indiana Jones, Tron: Legacy, Doctor Strange, and Guardians of the Galaxy.
- Wonderful World of Animation (May 1, 2019 – March 15, 2020; August 1, 2021 – present) – The show will kickoff with a tribute to the beginning of Disney animation, Mickey Mouse, and be followed by segments highlighting a number of animated feature film. Concept art currently confirms Snow White and the Seven Dwarfs, Sleeping Beauty, The Little Mermaid, Beauty and the Beast, Aladdin, Lilo & Stitch, Finding Nemo, The Incredibles, Frozen, Big Hero 6, Zootopia, Cars 3, Coco, and Ralph Breaks the Internet. Chris Diamantopoulos voices the 2013 edition of Mickey Mouse in a cameo appearance.

==== Former ====
- Sorcery in the Sky (May 29, 1990 – October 15, 1998) – This fireworks show debuted in 1990 when the film Fantasia was celebrating its 50th anniversary, and featured music score from such films as Puttin' on the Ritz, The Wizard of Oz, Singin' in the Rain, The Bridge on the River Kwai, Mary Poppins, Close Encounters of the Third Kind, Star Wars, Chariots of Fire, Raiders of the Lost Ark, and Fantasia. The show was cancelled in 1998, and its park replacement was Fantasmic!, debuting later that same year. The show was brought back from 2001 to 2003 for performances on July 4 and New Year's Eve before being replaced with new shows in 2004. While Sorcery in the Sky is no longer performed, a Hollywood-themed fireworks show is still occasionally presented during corporate functions and on special evenings such as New Year's Eve and Independence Day.
- Lights, Camera, Happy New Year! (2004–07) – This show debuted in 2004 as the New Year's Eve fireworks display for Disney's Hollywood Studios. A visually similar display was shown on Independence Day until 2011 when it was replaced by a new show.
- Rock the Night Fireworks (2008–15) – This was the New Year's Eve fireworks display. The show starred the park's in-house band Mulch, Sweat and Shears, and the fireworks were set to the band's live music performance. Occasionally, the show was performed outside of the New Year's holiday.
- Rockin' Fourth of July Celebration (2011–2017) – This is the former Independence Day fireworks display. It starred Mulch, Sweat and Shears, and was a similar set up to the New Year's show.
- Frozen Fireworks Spectacular (2014–15; seasonal)
- Symphony in the Stars: A Galactic Spectacular (2014–15; seasonal, 2015–16) – A Star Wars-themed fireworks show featuring John Williams' music. This fireworks show was first presented at a private showing on December 17, 2015 during an opening night event for The Force Awakens, and had been a nightly fireworks show until 2016.
- Star Wars: A Galactic Spectacular (June 17, 2016 – March 15, 2020) – A "second-generation" version of Symphony in the Stars and the largest fireworks display in the park's history. The show featured fireworks, projection mapping, fire effects, lasers, fog effects, and searchlights.

=== Parades ===
==== Former ====
- Dinosaurs Live (September 26, 1991 – August 29, 1992)
- Aladdin's Royal Caravan (December 21, 1992 – August 27, 1995)
- Toy Story Parade (November 22, 1995 – June 8, 1997)
- Hercules "Zero to Hero" Victory Parade (June 27, 1997 – April 18, 1998)
- Mulan Parade (June 19, 1998 – March 11, 2001)
- Disney Stars and Motor Cars Parade (October 1, 2001 – March 8, 2008)
- Block Party Bash (March 14, 2008 – January 1, 2011)
- Pixar Pals Countdown To Fun! (January 16, 2011 – April 6, 2013)
- 25th Anniversary Parade (May 1, 2014)
- Frozen Royal Welcome Ceremony (Summer 2014–2015; seasonal)

== Former attractions ==
Name	Attraction Type	Description
SuperStar Television	Interactive stage show	Here, guests could re-enact famous scenes from television history. Using chroma-key technology, the on-stage guests would be shown on TV monitors in the theatre appearing opposite famous celebrities. For example, a female guest would play Ethel Mertz alongside Lucille Ball's Lucy Ricardo in the famous candy factory scene from I Love Lucy. In another example, a guest would appear on the set of The Tonight Show being interviewed by Johnny Carson. It originally opened on May 1, 1989. It closed on September 26, 1998 and was replaced by Doug Live! The theatre was renovated to host a new live-action show, The American Idol Experience, inspired by the hit television series of the same name, which opened on February 14, 2009.
The Monster Sound Show	Interactive stage show	Guests could become volunteer Foley artists and add various sound effects to a short comedy film starring Chevy Chase and Martin Short. Sounds Dangerous! used this theatre. It originally opened on May 1, 1989, and was closed on February 20, 1999.
Who Wants to Be a Millionaire – Play It!	Interactive stage show	One of the first attractions to make use of the former production soundstages. During Star Wars Weekends, a Star Wars Edition of the game would be played. The game began with Greedo answering questions and a Gamorrean guard in the audience cheering him on, followed by a typically played game featuring all Star Wars questions. The attraction was closed in 2006, and its soundstages were renovated for Toy Story Mania!, which opened in May 2008.
Soundstage Restaurant	Quick service restaurant	Formerly located in the theatre which currently houses Disney Jr. Dance Party! Designed to look like a "live set" for animated feature films such as Beauty and the Beast and Aladdin, and before that, the live-action film Big Business.
Catwalk Bar	Bar	Cocktail bar located on catwalks above the seating and service areas for the Soundstage Restaurant. It was reached by a stairway and elevator between the Soundstage Restaurant and the Brown Derby.
Aladdin's Royal Caravan	Parade	Promoted with the release of film of the same name. It featured spitting camels that are now outside The Magic Carpets of Aladdin at the Magic Kingdom.
The Hunchback of Notre Dame – A Musical Adventure	Musical stage show	Based upon the 1996 animated musical film of the same name, was performed in the Backlot Theatre, which was renovated into the Premiere Theater, currently used for special events.
The Spirit of Pocahontas	Musical stage show	Based upon the 1995 animated film of the same name, was another performance located in the Backlot Theatre.
Here Come the Muppets	Stage show	The Muppet characters were portrayed in life-size costumes and performed songs in a concert form. The attraction was replaced by Voyage of the Little Mermaid in 1992.
Doug Live!	Stage show	Here, Doug and his friends performed daily. Guests were selected to play some of the other roles in the show.
Disney Stars and Motor Cars	Parade	Featured cars decorated to resemble various park characters, including those from Disney films.
Star Tours	Walk-Through and Ride-Through Attraction	Based upon the Star Wars saga, this attraction was replaced with the prequel version Star Tours – The Adventures Continue on May 20, 2011.
Journey into Narnia: Prince Caspian	Walk-through attraction	Guests could view props and set pieces on display from The Chronicles of Narnia film series, as well as meet the namesake of the second film in the series, Prince Caspian. This attraction was located in Animation Courtyard, and was closed on September 10, 2011. It was replaced by The Legend of Captain Jack Sparrow, which opened on December 6, 2012.
Sounds Dangerous!	Audio show	A show following Drew Carey through a day as an undercover detective when his video camera fails and the audience is left in the dark wearing earphones, following his adventure through sound cues.
Star Wars: Path of the Jedi	Audio show	A film retelling of Star Wars, located at ABC Sound Studio.
The American Idol Experience	Live stage show	A live show where guests audition in front of live audiences to vote for their favorite singers. Inspired by the television series of the same name.
Studio Backlot Tour	Tram tour	A walking-tram tour showing how film special effects are produced. Guests saw a scene from Pearl Harbor recreated on the Special Effects Water Tank with volunteers from the audience. After that, guests boarded studio trams and were taken through Catastrophe Canyon, to see fire and water effects, are driven past large-scale movie props, the Earffel Tower and are shown Creative Costuming department along with lighting and grip and the carpentry shop. The Earffel Tower was removed in April 2016.
The Legend of Captain Jack Sparrow	Interactive special effects show	An immersive walk-through special effects attraction based on the Pirates of the Caribbean series.
Lights, Motors, Action!: Extreme Stunt Show	Show	A car/motorcycle stunt show that debuted at the Walt Disney Studios Park. It was added to Hollywood Studios in 2005 and closed in April 2016.
Honey, I Shrunk the Kids: Movie Set Adventure	Playground	A playground area where kids can have fun in based on the film Honey, I Shrunk the Kids.
The Great Movie Ride	Dark ride	A dark ride paying homage to several classic films within the park's Chinese Theater. This attraction closed on August 13, 2017, and was replaced by Mickey & Minnie's Runaway Railway.
Disney Junior – Live on Stage!	Live Stage Show	Disney Junior – Live on Stage! closed on September 1, 2018. It was replaced by Disney Junior Dance Party! on December 22, 2018.
Jedi Training: Trials of the Temple	Live Stage Show	A live show based on the teachings and practices of the fictional Jedi Knights from the Star Wars films, depends heavily on audience participation, focusing on children. Each participant is given a lightsaber and Jedi robes and is taught a routine set of sword fighting moves.
Voyage of the Little Mermaid	Stage show	A live performance that recreated the animated musical film of the same name, in an abbreviated form using puppets, lasers, movies, human actors, and water (mist) in the Animation Courtyard Theater. The show closed in March 2020 alongside the resort's temporary closure from the COVID-19 pandemic. In January 2023, a mold infestation was reported in the attraction's building and the show's puppets were sold, which confirmed the permanent closure of the attraction.
Lightning McQueen's Racing Academy	Stage show	Based on the Cars franchise, this stage show featured an animatronic Lightning McQueen who took the stage teaching guests, dubbed “rookie racers”, how to be a racer on the racetrack using the simulator and also demonstrated how to work as a team with the help of. His friends in a simulated race against Chick Hicks.
Muppet*Vision 3D	4D film	In the Grand Arts Theatre, starring The Muppets. It was announced that Florida version of the final performance was permanently closed on June 7, 2025.
Disney Jr. Play and Dance!	Stage show	A live performance in Soundstage Theater, featuring television characters from Mickey Mouse Clubhouse+ Spidey and His Amazing Friends, Firebuds, SuperKitties, Star Wars: Young Jedi Adventures, Pupstruction, Ariel, Kindergarten: The Musical, RoboGobo, and Iron Man and His Awesome Friends.
Star Wars Launch Bay	Interactive theater show	An interactive walkthrough attraction featuring Star Wars character meet-and-greets, memorabilia, games and a gift shop.
Rock 'n' Roller Coaster Starring Aerosmith	Indoor roller coaster	An indoor roller coaster in the dark with three inversions and a high-speed launch in the fictional G-Force Records. In August 2025, it was announced that the roller coaster will be closed in March 1, 2026 to receive a retheme as Rock 'n' Roller Coaster Starring The Muppets. The re-themed ride opened on May 26, 2026.

== Characters ==
=== Current Characters ===
==== Seen in Hollywood Boulevard ====
- Pinocchio and Jiminy Cricket
- Mary Poppins, Bert and Penguin Waiters

==== Seen in Echo Lake ====
- Donald Duck and Daisy Duck
- Chip 'n' Dale
- Max Goof
- Pinocchio and Jiminy Cricket
- Baloo and King Louie
- Stitch
- Phineas Flynn and Ferb Fletcher
- Olaf
- Darth Vader
- Stormtroopers
- Indiana Jones and Marion Ravenwood
- Doc McStuffins
- Vampirina
- Fancy Nancy

==== Seen in Grand Avenue ====
- Goofy and Max Goof
- Pluto
- Scrooge McDuck
- Mary Poppins and Bert
- Duffy the Disney Bear

==== Seen in Star Wars: Galaxy's Edge ====
- Kylo Ren
- First Order Stormtroopers
- C-3PO
- R2-D2
- Rey
- Chewbacca
- BB-8
- Vi Moradi
- The Mandalorian
- Fennec Shand

==== Seen in Toy Story Land ====
- Woody
- Buzz Lightyear
- Bo Peep
- Jessie
- Rex
- Green Army Men
- Lots-O’-Hugging Bear from Toy Story 3

==== Seen in Pixar Plaza ====
- Mike Wazowski, James P. Sullivan and Boo from Monsters, Inc.
- Mr. Incredible, Elastigirl, Frozone and Edna Mode from The Incredibles
- Joy, Sadness, Anger and Bing Bong from Inside Out

==== Seen in Commissary Lane ====
- Mickey Mouse and Minnie Mouse
- Sofia the First
- Bitsy from SuperKitties

==== Seen in The Walt Disney Studios Lot ====
- Donald Duck and Daisy Duck
- Goofy
- Pluto
- Chip 'n' Dale
- Ariel from The Little Mermaid
- Mulan from Mulan
- Stitch
- Rapunzel from Tangled

==== Seen in Sunset Boulevard ====
- Evie Starlight
- Ginny Vermouth
- Phoebe Bizarre
- Cloe Canard
- Betty Shambles
- Flora Fiera
- Ace Victory
- Stone Granite
- Officer Pat Friskem
- Officer William Club
- Officer Percival Peabody
- Oscar Mayer Weiner
- Juan Scenario
- Jack Diamond
- Mayor Sonny Burbank
- Beau Wrangler
- Buddy Flowers

=== Former characters ===
- Ace Ventura (Note: The intellectual property rights are owned by Skydance Corporation.)
- Dick Tracy Mobsters
- Animal, Dr. Teeth, Floyd Pepper, Janice, Zoot and Bean Bunny
- Roger Rabbit
- Earl Sinclair, Fran Sinclair, Robbie Sinclair, Charlene Sinclair, Baby Sinclair and Ethyl Phillips from Jim Henson's Dinosaurs
- Leonardo, Donatello, Raphael, Michelangelo and April O'Neil
- Tom Cat and Jerry Mouse
- Special Agent Oso
- Handy Manny
- Leo, June, Quincy and Annie from Little Einsteins
- Jake from Jake and the Never Land Pirates
- Olie Polie and Zowie Polie from Rolie Polie Olie
- Stanley
- JoJo and Goliath the Lion from JoJo's Circus
- Jawas
- Star-Lord and Baby Groot
- Moana
- Queen of Narnia and Prince Caspian from The Chronicles of Narnia
- Kuzco and Kronk from The Emperor's New Groove
- Milo Thatch, Princess Kida, Vinny Santorini and Gaetan Molière from Atlantis
- Chicken Little and Abby Mallard
- Lewis Robinson, Wilbur Robinson and Bowler Hat Guy from Meet the Robinsons
- Remy and Emile from Ratatouille
- Bolt, Mittens and Rhino
- Carl Fredricksen, Russell and Dug from Up
- Winnie the Pooh
- Wreck-It Ralph and Vanellope Von Schweetz
- Hiro Hamada and Baymax
- Doug Funnie and Patti Mayonnaise from Doug
- Bear from Bear in the Big Blue House
- Power Rangers (Note: The intellectual property rights are owned by Hasbro.) characters
  - Pink Ranger (Power Rangers: Time Force), Lunar Wolf Ranger (Power Rangers: Wild Force), Green Ranger (Power Rangers: Ninja Storm), White Dino Ranger (Power Rangers: Dino Thunder), Red Ranger (Power Rangers: SPD), Pink Ranger (Power Rangers: Mystic Force), Yellow Ranger (Power Rangers: Operation Overdrive), Blue Ranger (Power Rangers: Jungle Fury) and Green Ranger (Power Rangers RPM)
- Kim Possible and Ron Stoppable
- Lightning McQueen, Tow Mater, Cruz Ramirez and DJ from Cars
- Rockhopper and Bambadee
- Constantine from Muppets Most Wanted

== See also ==
- List of Disney theme park attractions
- List of lands at Disney theme parks
- List of Magic Kingdom attractions
- List of Epcot attractions
- List of Disney's Animal Kingdom attractions
