= The Lion, the Witch and the Wardrobe (disambiguation) =

The Lion, the Witch and the Wardrobe is a 1950 novel by C. S. Lewis.

The Lion, the Witch and the Wardrobe may also refer to:

== Adaptations ==
- Adaptations of The Chronicles of Narnia, various adaptations of the story, including:

=== Film ===
- The Chronicles of Narnia: The Lion, the Witch and the Wardrobe, 2005 feature film adaptation of the novel
  - The Chronicles of Narnia: The Lion, the Witch and the Wardrobe (video game), 2005 video game based on the film
  - The Chronicles of Narnia: The Lion, the Witch and the Wardrobe (soundtrack), soundtrack of the 2005 film

=== Television ===
- The Lion, the Witch and the Wardrobe (1967 TV serial), ten-part serial broadcast on ITV
- The Lion, the Witch and the Wardrobe (1979 film), animated two-part television film produced by Bill Melendez Productions for the Children's Television Workshop
- The Lion, the Witch and the Wardrobe (1988 TV serial), children’s drama, first in a series of BBC adaptations of The Chronicles of Narnia
- "The Lion, the Witch and the Wardrobe", 1996 episode of the British sitcom 2point4 children

=== Theatre ===
- The Lion, the Witch and the Wardrobe (play), various adaptations for stage, including:
  - The Lion, the Witch and the Wardrobe (1989 play), dramatisation of the novel by American writer le Clanché du Rand
  - The Lion, the Witch, and the Wardrobe (2017 play)

== Other uses ==
- Journey into Narnia: Creating The Lion, the Witch, and the Wardrobe, theme park show that operated at Disney's Hollywood Studios from 9 December 2005 to 1 January 2008
- Music Inspired by The Chronicles of Narnia: The Lion, the Witch and the Wardrobe, 2005 collection of songs by various Christian artists with common theme The Chronicles of Narnia

== See also ==
- The Lyin', the Watch and the Wardrobe, a 2006 episode from the dramedy series Ugly Betty
- "The Doctor, the Widow and the Wardrobe", 2011 Doctor Who Christmas Special partly inspired by the novel
