= Toy Story Mania! =

Attraction type at Disney theme parks

- The entrance to Toy Story Mania! at Disney's Hollywood Studios

Disney's Hollywood Studios
- Name: Toy Story Mania!
- Area: Pixar Place (2008–2018); Toy Story Land (2018–present)
- Coordinates: 28.355991°N 81.561285°W
- Status: Operating
- Opening date: May 31, 2008 (Pixar Place); June 30, 2018 (Toy Story Land)
- Replaced: Who Wants to Be a Millionaire – Play It! (Animation Courtyard)
- Lightning Lane available

Disney California Adventure
- Name: Toy Story Midway Mania!
- Area: Paradise Pier (2008–2018); Pixar Pier (2018–present)
- Coordinates: 33.8045901°N 117.9238468°W
- Status: Operating
- Opening date: June 17, 2008
- Replaced: Malibu-Ritos; Pacific Ocean Photos; Boardwalk Betsy's Strips, Dips 'n' Chips (Paradise Pier)
- Lightning Lane available

Tokyo DisneySea
- Name: Toy Story Mania!
- Area: American Waterfront
- Coordinates: 35.6245305°N 139.8869587°E
- Status: Operating
- Opening date: July 9, 2012
- Disney Premier Access available

Ride statistics
- Attraction type: Shooting dark ride
- Manufacturer: Sansei Technologies
- Designer: Walt Disney Imagineering
- Theme: Toy Story; Midway carnival games
- Music: Randy Newman; Jennifer Hammond
- Vehicle type: Game Tram
- Riders per vehicle: 8
- Rows: 4
- Riders per row: 2
- Duration: 5-6 minutes
- Queue host: Mr. Potato Head
- Ride hosts: Woody; Buzz Lightyear
- Sponsor: Kao Corporation (Tokyo DisneySea)
- Wheelchair accessible
- Assistive listening available
- Closed captioning available

Toy Story Midway Mania! (also known as Toy Story Mania!) is an interactive 4-D dark ride attraction, located at three Disney theme parks: Disney's Hollywood Studios, Disney California Adventure and Tokyo DisneySea.

Designed by Walt Disney Imagineering and inspired by Pixar's Toy Story franchise, the attraction was first unveiled during a press conference at Walt Disney World in January 2007. The Florida version officially opened on May 31, 2008, while the California version officially opened on June 17, 2008. The Japan version of the attraction opened on July 9, 2012.

== Concept ==
Park guests wear 3-D glasses aboard spinning vehicles that travel through virtual environments based on classic carnival midway games. Ride vehicles seat up to eight in four back-to-back pairs.

=== Games ===
The attraction features five games after a practice round, where the player can hit targets from 100 to 5,000 points. Each game includes at least one "Easter egg" that can trigger additional targets or gameplay changes. The games are:

1. Pie Throw Practice Booth (pie toss target practice game, a no points introduction)
2. Hamm & Eggs (egg throw game featuring Hamm and Buttercup)
3. Rex and Trixie's Dino Darts (dart throw game)
4. Green Army Men Shoot Camp (baseball throw / plate breaking game)
5. Buzz Lightyear's Flying Tossers (ring toss game)
6. Woody's Rootin' Tootin' Shootin' Gallery (suction cup shooting game)

Each guest's score is recorded by an onboard display screen as points are acquired with individual toy cannons firing simulated projectiles at virtual targets. Toy Story characters including Woody, Hamm, Buzz Lightyear, Rex, Trixie and many more characters appear during the attraction's different games.

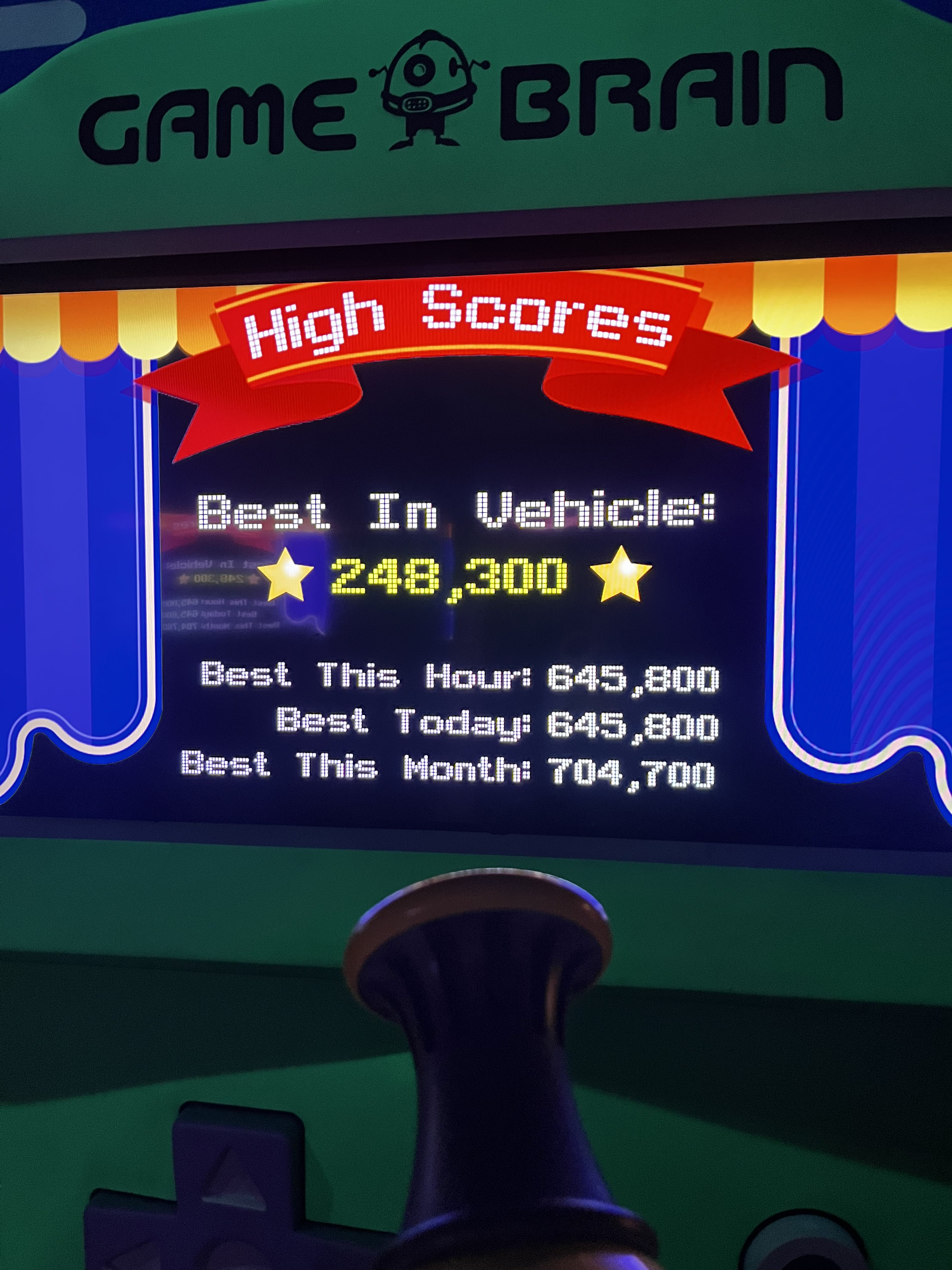
High Scores Screen at Toy Story Midway Mania! shown just at the end of the ride.

Similar technology had been used in Disney attractions such as Pirates of the Caribbean: Battle for Buccaneer Gold at DisneyQuest and several Buzz Lightyear attractions. According to Disney, it is the first attraction created simultaneously by Walt Disney Imagineering for two theme parks.

The attraction features a Mr. Potato Head Audio-Animatronics figure that interacts with guests through pre-recorded dialogue performed by Don Rickles, who voiced the character in the Toy Story films. The figure identifies people in the audience, sings and tells jokes.

=== Former games ===
In May 2010, the original dart throwing game, Bo Peep's Baaa-loon Pop, was replaced with "Rex and Trixie's Dino Darts" (updated with the release of Toy Story 3).

== Technology ==
At its debut, Toy Story Midway Mania! was one of the most technologically sophisticated attractions yet developed by Walt Disney Imagineering, costing an estimated $80 million to design and build. It marked the company's first use of industrial Ethernet for a ride's control system. Many of the parts for the attraction's control system came from two of Disney's corporate sponsors, Siemens AG (from Spaceship Earth) and Hewlett-Packard (from Mission: Space). The ride was the biggest system that had been built at the time and ran on one of Disney's most advanced automation systems to date.

The control system is divided into three components: one for the ride vehicles, one for the games and one more for the attraction's special effects. Programmable logic controllers in the vehicles alert the control system wirelessly via ProfiNET RT to the vehicle's speed and location. The central controller then sends its instructions back to the vehicles using a hard-wired network within the track. The one-way communications flow adds a factor of safety, even though the wireless network is protected against outside interference, such as a denial-of-service attack.

The attraction features more than 150 PCs, which includes one HP Windows XP PC for each of Midway Mania's 56 game screens, as well as others that control the special effects at each game. At the game screens, two tracking systems provide the game control system with the vehicle's exact location, making sure that gameplay is not affected by even minor differences in vehicle position. According to Jody Gerstner, executive director of show and ride controls, "The game doesn't care if the car parks in the same spot every time. It just needs to know where each car has actually parked, and it can compensate." Additional sensors in the spring-action shooter provide information on its orientation, which is fine-tuned using data on the position of the ride vehicle at the screen and the rotation of the seats on the vehicle base.

All three sub-systems work together to handle any contingency. For example, if a delay or other vehicle stoppage is detected (such as might occur if the loading and unloading of the ride vehicles is taking longer than expected), the control system can command the affected game screens to launch a non-scoring practice round, so that guests may continue to shoot targets while they wait. Similarly, it can instruct the show control system to play an audio spiel telling guests about the delay.

As the games are software-based, changes can be made to the attraction's lineup of games without significant effort. In April 2010, Disney Parks announced plans to replace Bo Peep's Baaa-loon Pop with Rex and Trixie's Dino Darts. The change took place on May 21, 2010. The new game includes one of the new characters from the Toy Story 3 feature film, which was released in June 2010.

== Locations ==
Attraction logo at Disney California Adventure

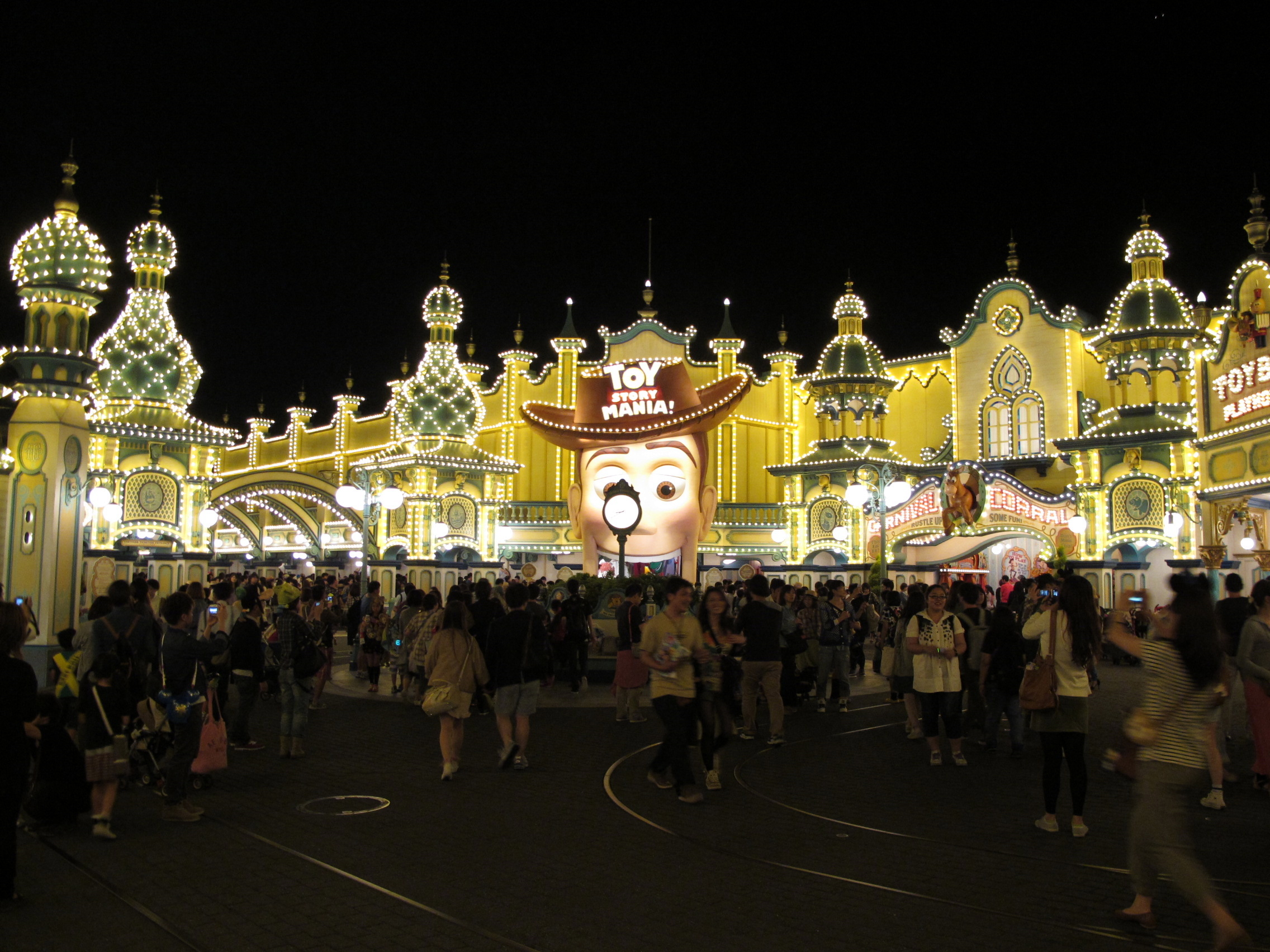
Toy Story Mania at Tokyo DisneySea at night

- Disney California Adventure: Pixar Pier, beneath the Incredicoaster roller coaster, a space formerly occupied by themed midway games and food service locations. The area is designed to resemble a Victorian-era seaside carnival. Pixar Pier replaced Paradise Pier on June 23, 2018, and the attraction located in California is the main attraction of the Toy Story Boardwalk area in the land.
- Disney's Hollywood Studios: Toy Story Land, inside the studios' former soundstages, which were most recently used for the park's Who Wants to Be a Millionaire – Play It! attraction. The original facade, as well as the original surrounding area, resembles Pixar Animation Studios' campus in Emeryville, California. The attraction's entrance was relocated to Toy Story Land on June 30, 2018, with the Pixar Place area closing.
- Tokyo DisneySea: Located in the New York area of the American Waterfront in a new area called Toyville Trolley Park.

== Operational changes ==
In October 2014, Disney's Hollywood Studios began testing a new procedure that would require all riders to have FastPass reservations for the attraction. The test, scheduled to last for a few days, eliminated the standby line that is used by visitors who have not already obtained a FastPass ticket for the ride, either because they had all been claimed or they were holding FastPasses for other attractions.

In May 2016, a third track of the ride was opened to further increase ride capacity.

== Name variation ==
The attraction is being referred to as both Toy Story Midway Mania! and Toy Story Mania!. While the attraction marquees and some in-park signage read the former, the latter has been used in press releases to the news media, used in both resorts' advertisements, and on the Disneyland.com, Disney World.com, and official promotional website for the attraction, along with attraction merchandise. Websites for both Disneyland and Walt Disney World both identified the attraction with the registered trademark "Toy Story Midway Mania!" as of September 2014. As of February 2019, the attraction is known as "Toy Story Mania!", except for the Disney California Adventure version which is still known as "Toy Story Midway Mania!"

== Voice cast ==
- Don Rickles as Mr. Potato Head
- Jim Hanks as Woody
- Tim Allen as Buzz Lightyear
- Kat Cressida as Jessie
- Annie Potts as Bo Peep
- Wallace Shawn as Rex
- John Ratzenberger as Hamm
- Jeff Garlin as Buttercup
- Kristen Schaal as Trixie
- R. Lee Ermey as Sarge
- Jeff Pidgeon as Little Green Men
- Stephen Stanton as Stinky Pete the Prospector

== Music ==
Music for the queue area was arranged and recorded by Jennifer Hammond at Capitol Studios with a live orchestra. More than an hour of music was recorded, all based on the first two Toy Story scores composed by Randy Newman.

== Merchandising ==
Disney Interactive Studios released a Toy Story Mania! video game in September 2009 exclusively for the Nintendo Wii console. The game features gameplay and levels similar to those in the theme park attractions, along with original levels and features. Jakks Pacific also released their "Plug It In & Play TV Game" version of Toy Story Mania! in 2010 featuring the original levels & Infini-D technology (Infini-D glasses are included). A version for Xbox 360 and PlayStation 3 was released on October 30, 2012, and developed by High Voltage Software.

== See also ==
- 2012 in amusement parks
- List of Disney California Adventure attractions
- List of Disney's Hollywood Studios attractions
- Toy Story Land
- Buzz Lightyear attractions
