= Disney Wonder =

Cruise ship operated by Disney Cruise Line

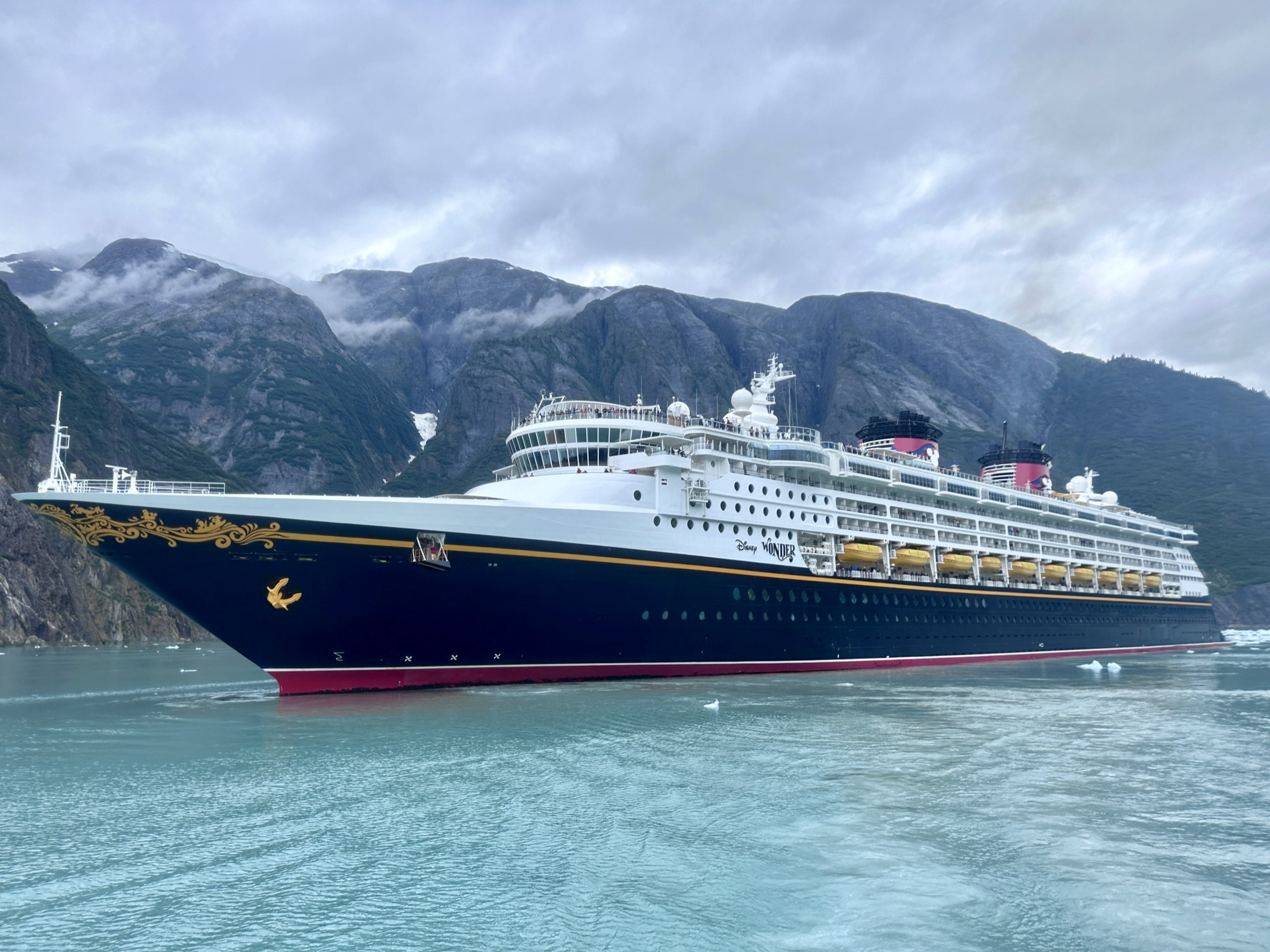
- Disney Wonder in 2023

History

Bahamas
- Name: Disney Wonder
- Owner: The Walt Disney Company
- Operator: Disney Cruise Line
- Port of registry: Nassau, Bahamas
- Ordered: April 27, 1995
- Builder: Fincantieri (Marghera, Italy)
- Cost: US$400 million (equivalent to $773 million in 2025)
- Yard number: 5990
- Laid down: May 15, 1997
- Launched: February 23, 1998
- Sponsored by: Tinker Bell
- Christened: October 1, 1999
- Completed: June 17, 1999
- Maiden voyage: August 15, 1999
- In service: 1999–present
- Identification: IMO number: 9126819; MMSI number: 308457000; Call sign: C6QM8
- Status: In service

General characteristics
- Class & type: Magic-class cruise ship
- Tonnage: 84,130 GT
- Length: 294 m (964 ft)
- Beam: 32.25 m (105 ft 10 in)
- Height: 52.3 m (171 ft 7 in)
- Draft: 8.15 m (26 ft 9 in)
- Decks: 11
- Installed power: 5 × 16-cylinder Sulzer diesel engines turning Ansaldo generators producing 11,520 kW (15,450 hp) each
- Propulsion: 2 × 19 MW (25,000 hp) GE motors turning propellers; 3 × 1,800 kW (2,400 hp) Fincantieri bow thrusters; 2 × 1,800 kW (2,400 hp) Fincantieri stern thrusters
- Speed: Service: 21.5 kn (39.8 km/h; 24.7 mph); Maximum: 24.7 kn (45.7 km/h; 28.4 mph)
- Capacity: 2,713
- Crew: 950
- Notes: Bow character: Steamboat Willie; Atrium character: Ariel; Stern characters: Donald Duck and Huey

Disney Wonder is a cruise ship owned and operated by Disney Cruise Line, a subsidiary of the Walt Disney Company. She is the second ship in the Disney Cruise Line fleet and the second vessel of the Magic class, following Disney Magic (1998).

The Magic class was ordered on April 27, 1995, and built by Fincantieri at its shipyard in Marghera, Italy. Construction of the vessel began with the keel laying on May 15, 1997, and the ship was launched on February 23, 1998. She was completed on June 17, 1999, and entered service with her maiden voyage on August 15, 1999. She was officially christened on October 1, 1999. The ship reportedly cost approximately US$400 million (equivalent to $773 million in 2025).

Disney Wonder contains 11 public decks, can accommodate 2,700 passengers in 875 staterooms, and has a crew of approximately 950. The ship features an Art Nouveau design, incorporating stylistic references to ocean liners of the early 20th-century, including a long, low profile and a black hull with red accents, which also reflect the colors associated with Mickey Mouse.

== History ==
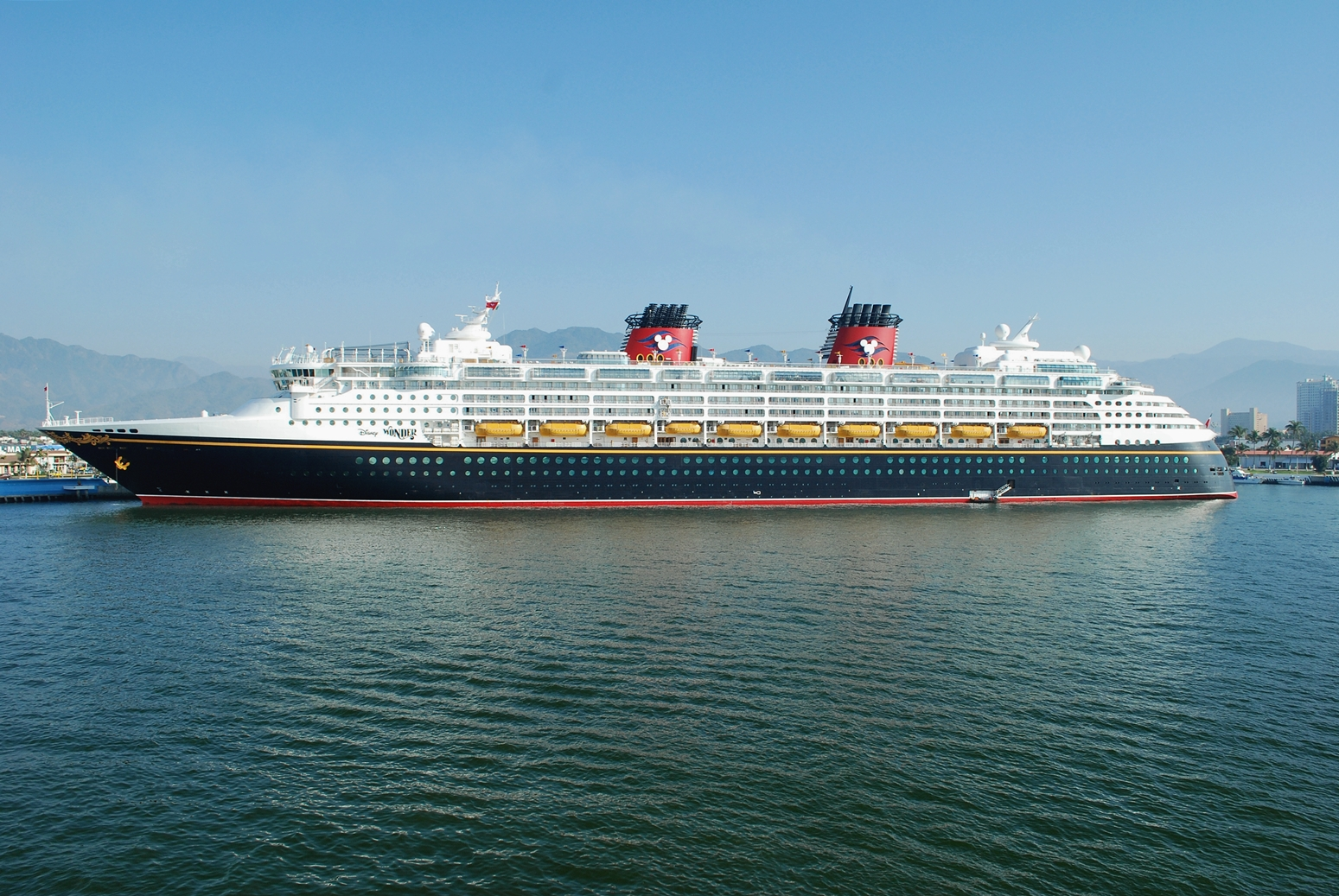
Disney Wonder at Puerto Vallarta

Disney had cruise ship designs drawn up by February 1994. In 1995, Disney Cruise Line commissioned the construction of Disney Magic and Disney Wonder in Fincantieri, Italy. She was laid down on May 5, 1997, launched on February 23, 1998, and completed on June 18, 1999. The ship's godmother was Disney character Tinkerbell (who only spoke with bell sounds), and Mickey Mouse (voiced by Wayne Allwine) gave the ship's blessing in English. Wonder entered into service in August 1999.

Disney Wonder originally sailed three and four-night cruises to the Bahamas. In 2011, Disney Dream took over these itineraries. Since then, the Disney Wonder has been sailing a variety of itineraries that include stops in Alaska, the Mexican Riviera, Hawaii, the Caribbean, and passages through the Panama Canal.

With the arrival of Disney Dream in 2011, Disney Wonder was relocated to Los Angeles under a two-year contract with a three-year extension with the port.

On January 10, 2013, Disney Wonder made her first-call ceremony in Miami, Florida. Cruises while stationed in Miami would consist of four- and five-night itineraries to the Bahamas and Western Caribbean with stops in Cozumel, Mexico; Disney's private island, Castaway Cay; Grand Cayman; Key West and Nassau, Bahamas. The ship returned in April 2013 to Vancouver, British Columbia, for Alaskan cruises.

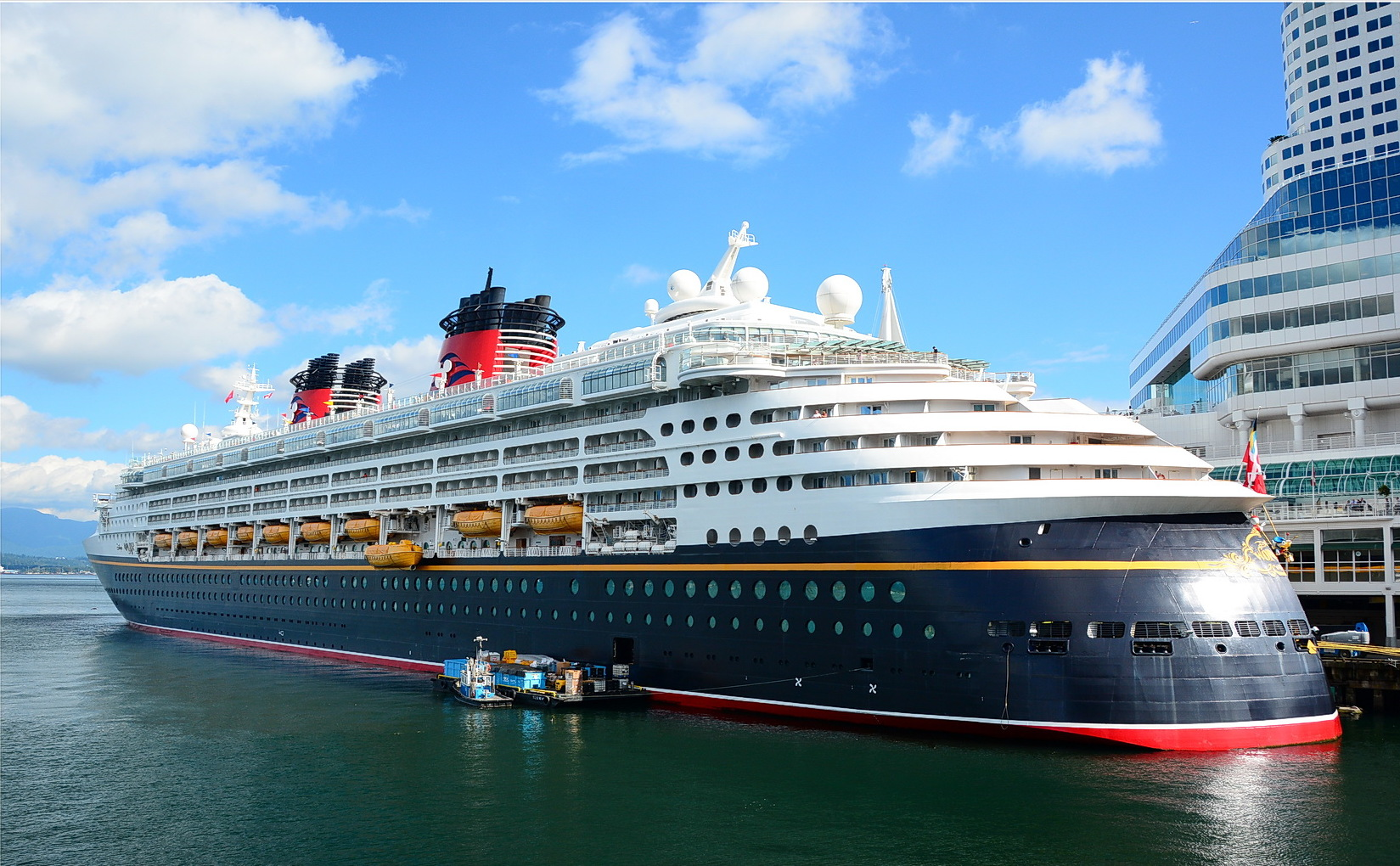
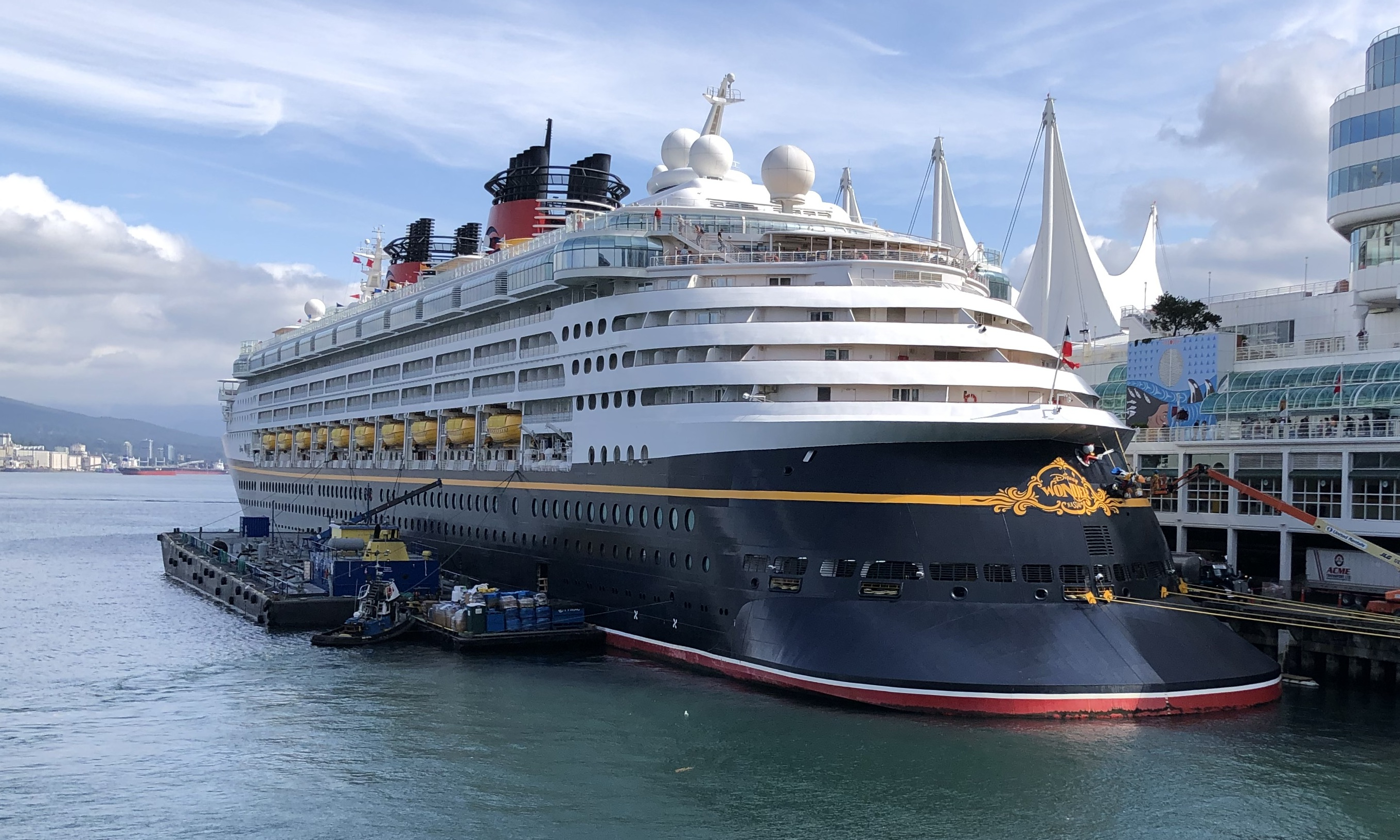
Disney Wonder before (left) and after (right) the addition of its "ducktail"

Disney Wonder was put in for an overhaul at Navantia's shipyard in Cádiz, Spain in September 2016. A 6-meter (20 ft) "ducktail" sponson was added to improve efficiency. Updates were made to the ship's cabins, lounges, restaurants and spa. Work took place from in September 2016 until October 23, 2016.

Disney Wonder was stationed out of Galveston, Texas starting November 10, 2016. In October 2018, Disney Cruise Line began showing Disney at Sea with D23, a 30-minute entertainment news show that covers the many Disney subsidiaries with input from D23, starting with Disney Wonder.

A cruise in spring 2020 was shortened by the COVID-19 pandemic. The ship arrived at the Port of San Diego, California, on March 19, 2020, where 1,980 passengers disembarked; there were no reports that any had flu-like symptoms. By April 5, 38 crew members had reportedly tested positive to the SARS-CoV-2 coronavirus, according to a report by Cruise Law News based on discussions with unnamed individuals on the ship. Disney, however, told other news media that none of the crew had tested positive. A passenger who disembarked at San Diego on March 20 reported that no health screening activities, such as the asking of health-related questions or the taking of temperatures, had occurred upon disembarkation, and that the only health screening that occurred was during the check-in process two weeks prior. After disembarking the passengers in March the ship was placed under a no-sail order, effective through July, by the Centers for Disease Control. As of May 2020, Disney Wonder and two other cruise ships were still at anchor offshore from San Diego. Approximately 700 crew were reportedly still aboard Disney Wonder.

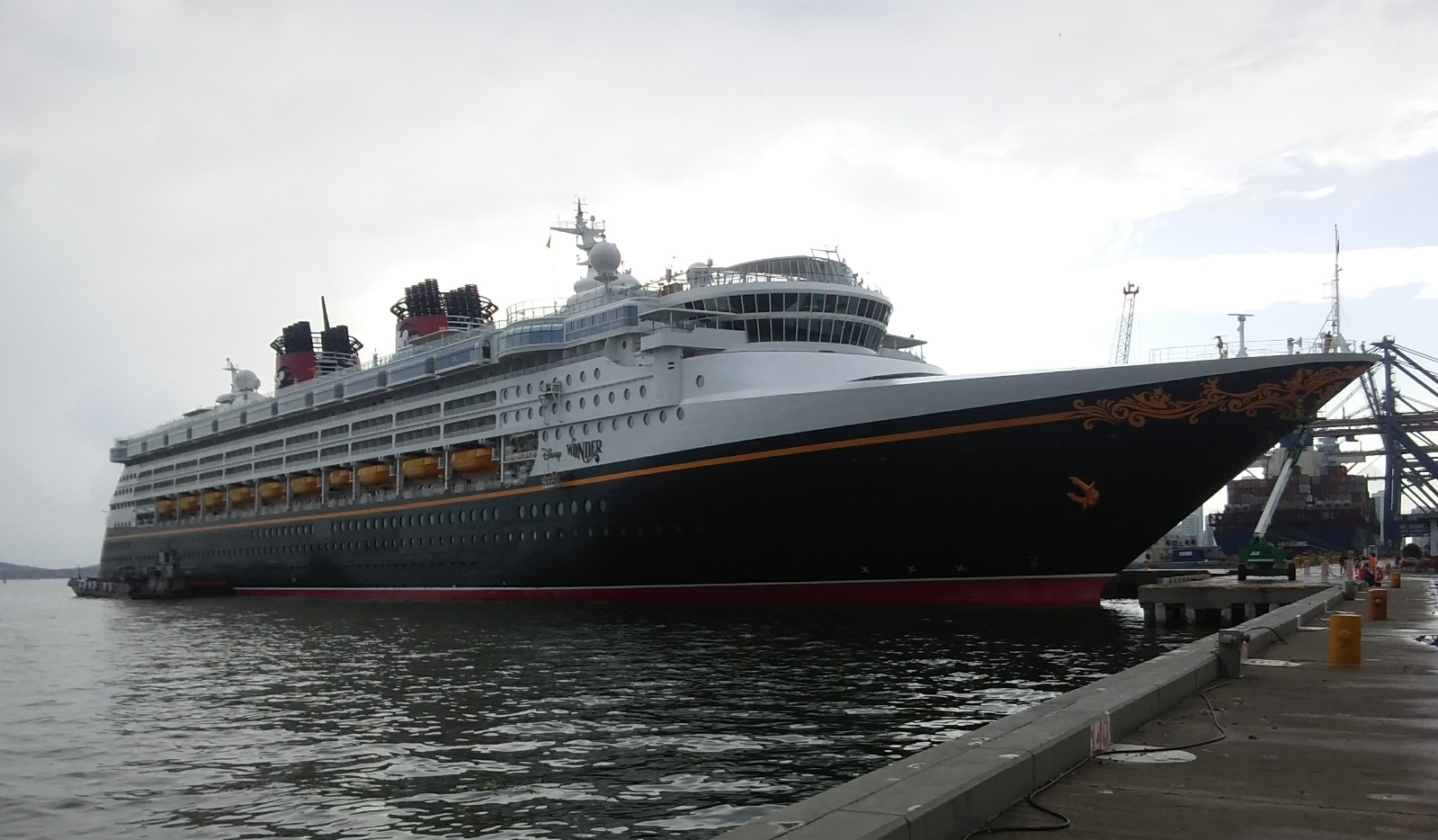
Disney Wonder in Colombia on November 14, 2021

After the resumption of cruising in October 2021, Disney Wonder made sailing short cruises from San Diego, Galveston, and New Orleans, Louisiana, with a significantly reduced passenger load.

On March 31, 2022, the Disney Wonder made her inaugural trip to Avalon Catalina Island on a 4-night cruise, also stopping at Ensenada. This was celebrated in accordance with maritime tradition plaque exchanges.

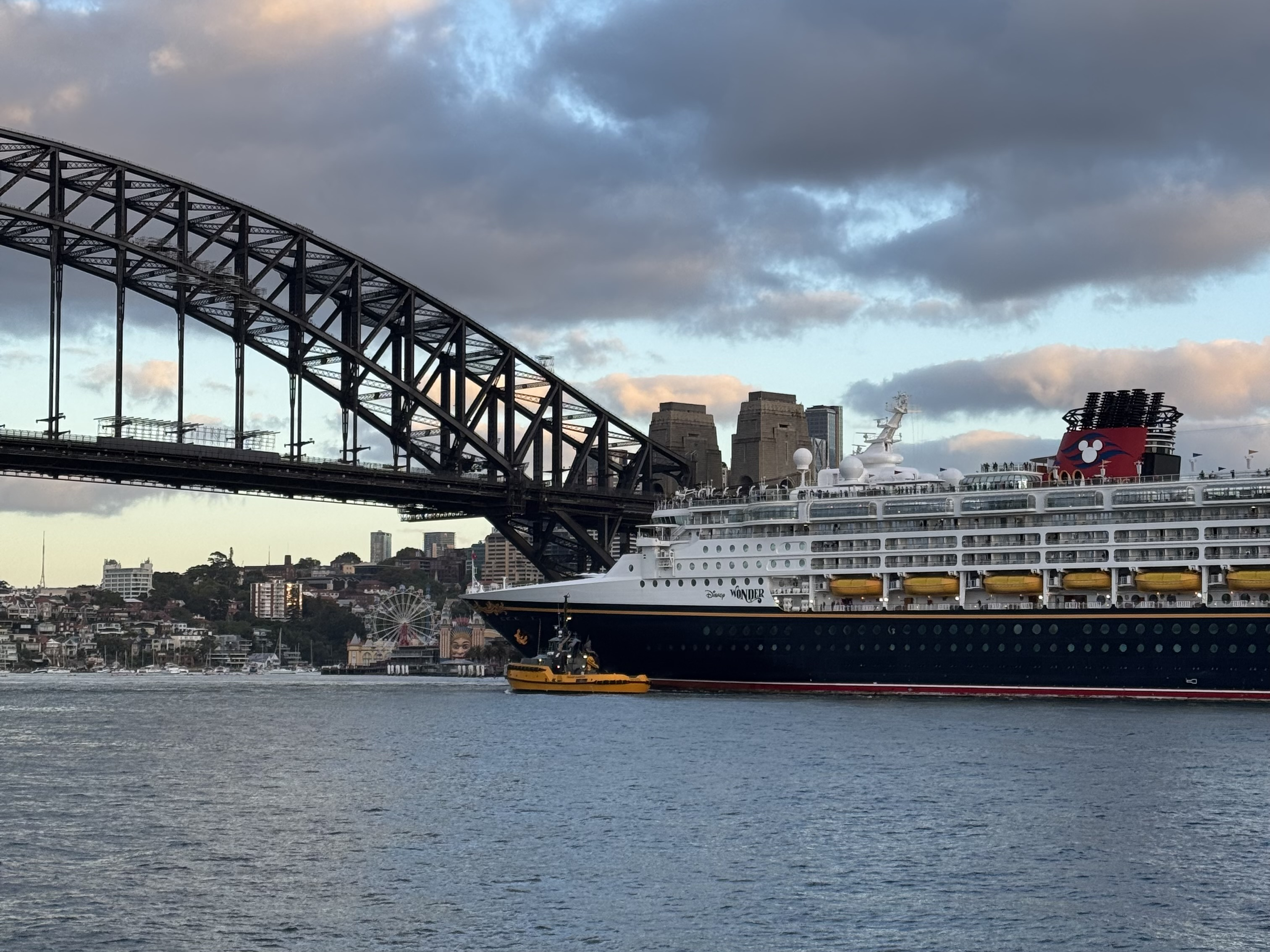
Disney Wonder arriving at Sydney, Australia, on December 29, 2025

In October 2023, Disney Wonder began a new itinerary from Australia sailing to out of Sydney to Auckland, Brisbane and Melbourne. She arrived in Sydney via Honolulu, Hawaii in October 2023 and will return to Vancouver in March 2024. She returned to San Diego, where offering 3-day and 4-day Baja, and 7-day Mexican Riviera cruises, then to Vancouver from San Diego for 7-day Alaskan round trips. The ship returned to Australia in October, and came back to Honolulu and Vancouver in February 2025. A third and final season in Australia and New Zealand began in October 2025 and ran until February 2026, with reports suggesting high prices, limited port calls, and complex regulations were to blame for the discontinuance. As of January 2026, the Disney Cruise Line website lists the Wonder as operating cruises from San Diego, California to Ensenada, Mexico and other ports between October 2026 and March 2027.

=== Crew member disappearance ===
In the early morning hours of March 22, 2011, Rebecca Coriam, a 24-year-old crew member from the United Kingdom, was last seen by one of Disney Wonder's security cameras, after an apparently upsetting telephone conversation, before she disappeared the next day, marking the first such incident in the history of Disney Cruise Line. While Coriam has never been found, the investigation has remained ongoing since then. Her family sued Disney but eventually settled out of court.

== Recreation ==
=== Entertainment ===
Entertainment on the Disney Wonder include three live Broadway-style shows: Frozen: A Musical Spectacular, The Golden Mickeys and Disney Dreams at the Walt Disney Theater. Other indoor entertainment offerings include the Buena Vista movie theater, featuring films and first-run movies released under the Disney umbrella, night clubs and lounges. Outdoor offerings include pools, hot tubs and Disney-themed parties and celebrations, including Mickey's Sail-Away Party on embarkation day, Pirate Night (featuring fireworks at sea), Frozen Night and For the First Time in Forever: A Frozen Sing-Along Celebration (both during Alaskan voyages, the latter during 2026 voyages) and sometimes a Marvel or Star Wars Day at Sea.

The ship's forward funnel features a 24-by-14 ft LED screen, known as the Funnel Vision, where Disney films are screened in front of the main pools and hot tubs, as well as from the upper deck.

=== Recreational activities ===
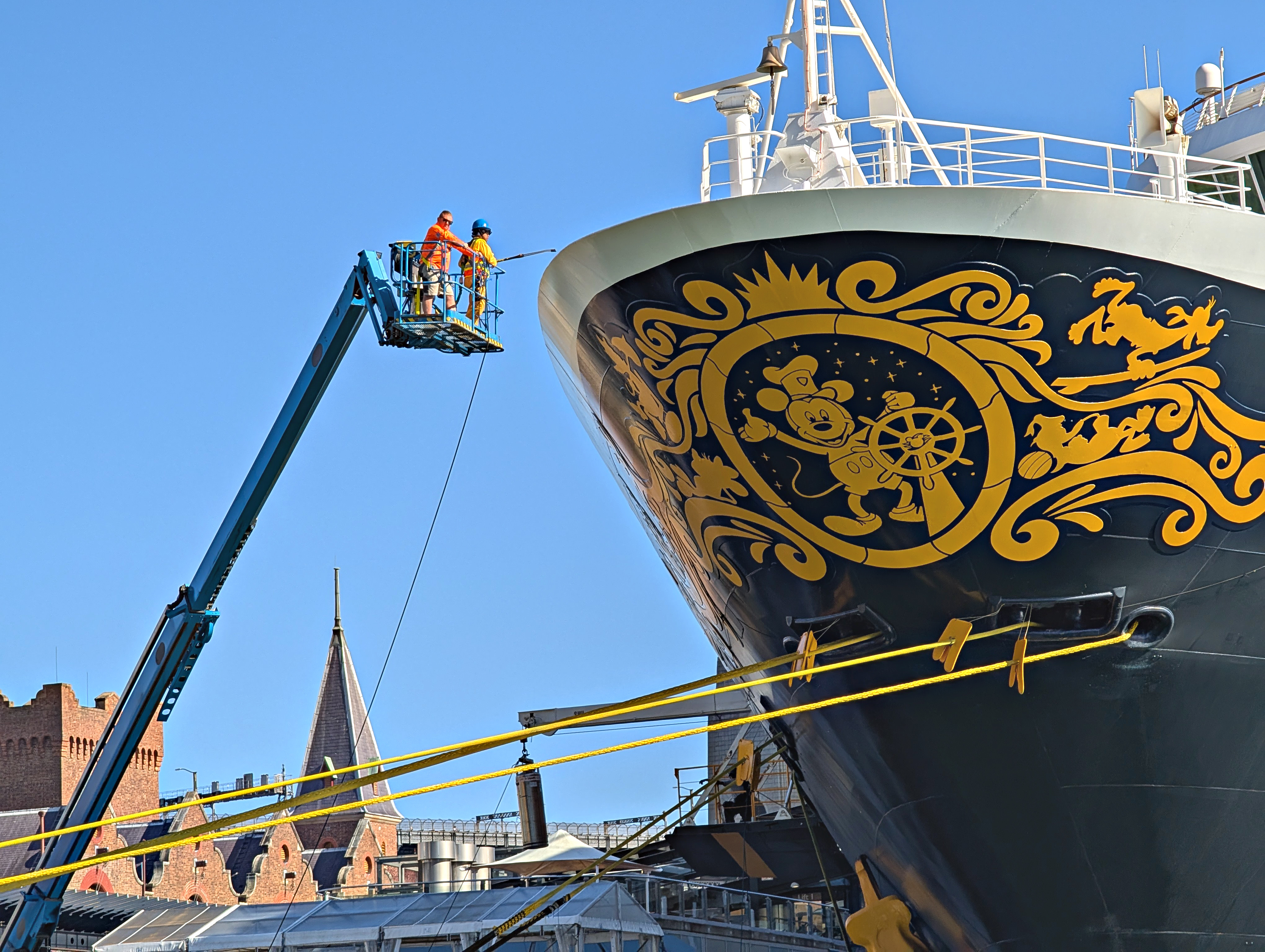
Disney Wonder at the Overseas Passenger Terminal, Sydney in December 2024

Recreational activities for children include the Oceaneer Club (ages 3–10), Edge (ages 11–14) and Vibe (ages 14–17). The Oceaneer Club utilizes a check-in system for staff to keep accountability through the scanning of the MagicBands of their participants.

For adults, one of the ship's three pools is reserved exclusively for guests of age 18 and over, featuring a poolside bar. Additional adult offerings include a spa and fitness center. Adults-only activities are also offered, including limited alcohol tastings, trivia, and other activities in the nightclub section of the ship, which becomes adults-only after 9pm.

The ship also has a walking and trotting track around the exterior of the fourth deck.

=== Dining ===
Disney Cruise line is known for pioneering the rotational dining setup, in which guests and their wait staff rotate through three differently themed restaurants throughout their cruise. The Disney Wonder's restaurants include Triton's, serving "continental food with a french flair", Tiana's Place, serving southern, cajun- and creole-inspired food, and The Animator's Palate, a restaurant featured on the Magic, Dream and the Fantasy. Additionally, the up-scale, adults-only restaurant Palo, situated on deck 10 at the rear of the ship, requires a separate reservation and upcharge, serving high-end Italian cuisine nightly, and brunch on sea days.
