= Who Wants to Be a Millionaire – Play It! =

American theme park attraction

Disney's Hollywood Studios
- Area: Animation Courtyard
- Status: Closed
- Opening date: April 7, 2001
- Closing date: August 19, 2006
- Replaced by: Toy Story Midway Mania! (Toy Story Land)

Disney California Adventure
- Area: Hollywood Pictures Backlot
- Status: Closed
- Opening date: September 14, 2001
- Closing date: August 20, 2004
- Replaced by: Dancin' with Disney

Ride statistics
- Attraction type: Game show taping
- Designer: Walt Disney Entertainment
- Model: Game show
- Theme: Who Wants to Be a Millionaire
- Duration: 25 minutes
- FastPass was Available
- Wheelchair accessible

Who Wants to Be a Millionaire – Play It! was a game show taping mock-up at Disney's Hollywood Studios (formerly Disney-MGM Studios) theme park at Walt Disney World Resort in Orlando, Florida from April 7, 2001 to August 19, 2006, and Disney California Adventure at Disneyland Resort in Anaheim, California from September 14, 2001 to August 20, 2004. The attraction was a modified version of the Who Wants to Be a Millionaire television game show.

== Game information ==
The attraction's theater was a replica of the television show. Sessions of the game ran several times a day; each session was 25 minutes long (but did wait until the current contestant vacated the hot seat to stop) and seated 647 park guests. The multiple hosts that were used for the attraction were various Disney cast members who tried to emulate U.S. primetime host Regis Philbin's hosting style, including his mannerisms.

The Disney park version of the game differed from the television version in several ways:

- Contestants competed for points, not dollars. A contestant won a Disney collector's pin for each point level they passed (minus any down to the previous milestone if they got a question wrong). A prize table can be found below.
- Every audience member had their own A/B/C/D keypad. The ten contestant row seats were not special in any way (other than a video display of the camera work). Access to these seats were chosen in a number of different ways before the show, including random selection, quizzing of guests waiting in queue, and special "Magic Moment" coupons dispensed from the attraction's "Fast Pass" dispensers telling the bearer to present their Fast Pass to an attraction cast member for special seating. There were several times where just asking before the show began would grant access to one of these seats if they were still available for the next show.
- To begin a session, a fastest finger question was asked. The audience member who got the correct answer in the shortest time got the hot seat.
- The hot seat contestant had only fifteen seconds to answer each of the first five questions (100-1,000 points), thirty seconds per question for the next five questions (2,000-32,000 points), forty-five seconds for the next four questions (64,000-500,000 points), and fifty-five seconds for the final million-point question; the real show internationally carried a variation of this format from 2008 to 2010.
- Each audience member could answer a question on their keypad at the same time as the hot seat contestant did. Contestants won points by pressing the correct button quickly; at the 1,000 and 32,000-point levels the game was paused briefly to show the top ten scores. If the hot seat contestant got a question wrong or decided to walk away, instead of additional fastest finger questions, the top scorer in the audience took his place, as long as there was time remaining. (Usually, only two full games were played.) The player with the highest score on the last game only won congratulations from the host, if that.
- The three lifelines were 50:50, Ask the Audience, or Phone a Complete Stranger. Ask the Audience is immediate; the audience's answers can be instantly polled, because the audience already had a chance to enter their answers. Phone a Complete Stranger connected the contestant to a Cast Member outside the theater who found a guest to help.
- Disney Cast Members were not permitted to participate.
- Park guests playing as hot-seat contestants were required to sign a waiver after completing their game. This waiver declared the "Fair Market Value" of all prizes received (in Walt Disney World by regulations set by the Florida Gaming Commission) and an agreement that the guest would be ineligible to participate as a hot seat game player for a pre-determined amount of time (100-500,000 point winners had a 30-day blackout, while 1,000,000 point winners also had the 30-day blackout and were also prohibited from winning the million-point prize again for 365 days).
- Questions based on Disney parks and films often appeared at any point during the game.
- Because the Fastest Finger question could be won by a younger audience member randomly selecting the correct one of the 24 possible orders and inputting it in a ridiculously small amount of time, the first five questions were usually easy enough that anyone in the audience could answer them correctly.

== Prizes ==
Upon correctly answering each question, the player received a collectible lapel pin with the attraction's logo and question point value. Various other prizes were awarded at milestone questions. The chart below references all the prizes obtained by achieving each milestone. No cash prize was awarded.

Question No.	Milestone	Prize(s)
5	1,000 Points	"Play It!" lanyard 100-1,000 point pins 1,000 point baseball cap
10	32,000 Points	"Play It!" lanyard 100-32,000 point pins 1,000 point baseball cap 32,000 point embroidered shirt
15	1,000,000 Points	"Play It!" lanyard 100-1,000,000 point pins 1,000 point baseball cap 32,000 point embroidered shirt 1,000,000 point leather jacket 1,000,000 point medallion Disney Cruise Line vacation for four

In the early days of the attractions, contestants would also receive a copy of the "Who Wants to Be a Millionaire" CD-ROM game upon correctly answering the 32,000 point question.

During the original television run of "Who Wants to Be a Millionaire", contestants would receive a trip for two to New York City to see a taping of the television game when correctly answering the Million point question, in lieu of a Disney Cruise vacation.

=== Special events ===
During Disney's Hollywood Studios' Star Wars Weekends, the first two games of the day featured questions based on the Star Wars films and universe and began with Greedo in the hot seat, answering questions in the alien language Rodanese. The lifelines in the "Star Wars Weekends" version of the game worked exactly like the regular game but were named 50:50, Ask the Jedi Council, and Phone a Stormtrooper.

During ESPN The Weekend, also based at Disney's Hollywood Studios, Play It! consisted of sports trivia questions; contestants got to "team up" with ESPN personalities and sports figures. For this edition of the game, the "Phone A Complete Stranger" lifeline was replaced with a chance to ask an ESPN expert (either Howie Schwab or the Sklar Twins) for assistance.

== History ==
Both versions of the attraction at Disney's Hollywood Studios and Disney California Adventure offered FASTPASS on these attractions. FASTPASS at Disney California Adventure was available for the whole run, while the version at Disney's Hollywood Studios was taken out when the Lights, Motors, Action!: Extreme Stunt Show opened in 2005.

The attraction's former sound stages at Disney's Hollywood Studios are now the site of the interactive Toy Story Midway Mania! attraction.

The sound stage and Millionaire attraction at Disney California Adventure were built in an effort to improve the park after it faced criticism and low attendance upon its opening in February 2001.

When the Millionaire attraction in Disney's Hollywood Studios (Orlando, Florida) closed, most of the props from the studio were removed and given to a 3rd party company who sold them online. Such items include all of the audience member keypads, fastest-finger chairs, monitor covers and more. Jeff Gross (former $500,000 winner on the U.S. syndicated version of the show, and also a contestant on the British version of the show where he won £64,000 and witnessed the coughing antics of Tecwen Whittock) announced in November 2008 during an appearance as an 'expert' for Millionaire's new "Ask the Expert" lifeline, that he was the successful bidder for the auction of Play It!'s contestant hot seat. The hot seat reportedly sold on eBay for more than $400.

In 2020, during the COVID-19 pandemic, the Disney California Adventure Play It! sign from the building exterior was on display while the former attraction's soundstage was temporarily converted to the Backlot Premiere Shop.

=== TV broadcasts ===
On several occasions over three years, the attraction at Disney's Hollywood Studios hosted tapings of the syndicated television show for later broadcast.

== See also ==
- Disney's Hollywood Studios
- Disney's Hollywood Studios attraction and entertainment history
