= The American Idol Experience =

Former theme park attraction at Disney's Hollywood Studios

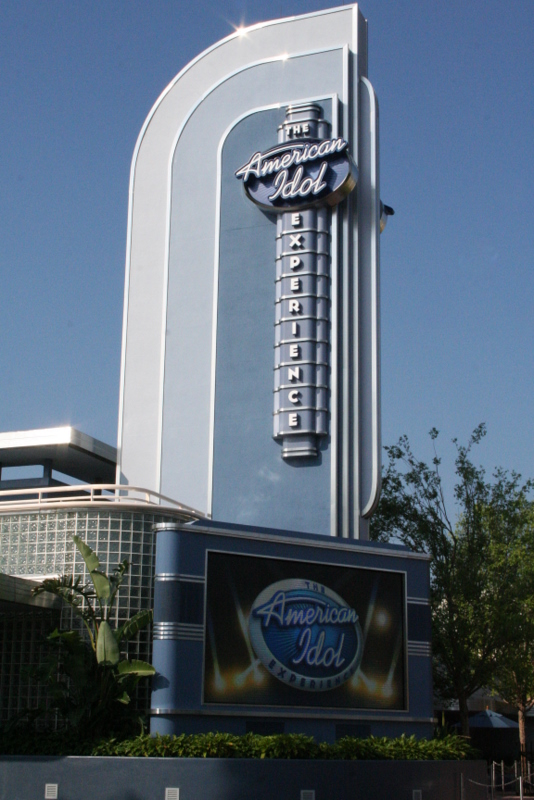
- Attraction entrance

Disney's Hollywood Studios
- Area: Echo Lake
- Coordinates: 28°21′23.45″N 81°33′34.59″W
- Status: Removed
- Opening date: February 14, 2009
- Closing date: August 30, 2014
- Replaced: Doug Live! (1999–2001); Theater vacant from 2001–2008
- Replaced by: For the First Time in Forever: A Frozen Sing-Along Celebration (2015-present)

Ride statistics
- Attraction type: Live singing auditions
- Designer: Walt Disney Imagineering (attraction design); Fremantle/Thames Television; 19 Entertainment (show format)
- Theme: American Idol
- Hosted by: Ryan Seacrest (pre-show)
- FastPass+ available again
- Wheelchair accessible

The American Idol Experience was a theme park attraction at Disney's Hollywood Studios at the Walt Disney World Resort. Inspired by the popular American television series American Idol, the attraction invited park guests 14 years or older to audition in front of live audiences who would vote for their favorite singers.

== History ==
The attraction's grand opening took place on February 14, 2009, with occasional preview performances in the weeks leading up to the official opening. A press event just prior to the official opening featured many "Idol" celebrities, including all seven winners, numerous finalists, host Ryan Seacrest, judge Paula Abdul and "American Idol" creator Simon Fuller.

The attraction was promoted by winners of the American Idol from the seventh season onwards by appearing in commercials and announcing "I'm going to Disney World!".

In June 2014, Disney announced that the show would close in January 2015, then two months later they pushed forward the closure to the end of August 2014.

== Operations ==
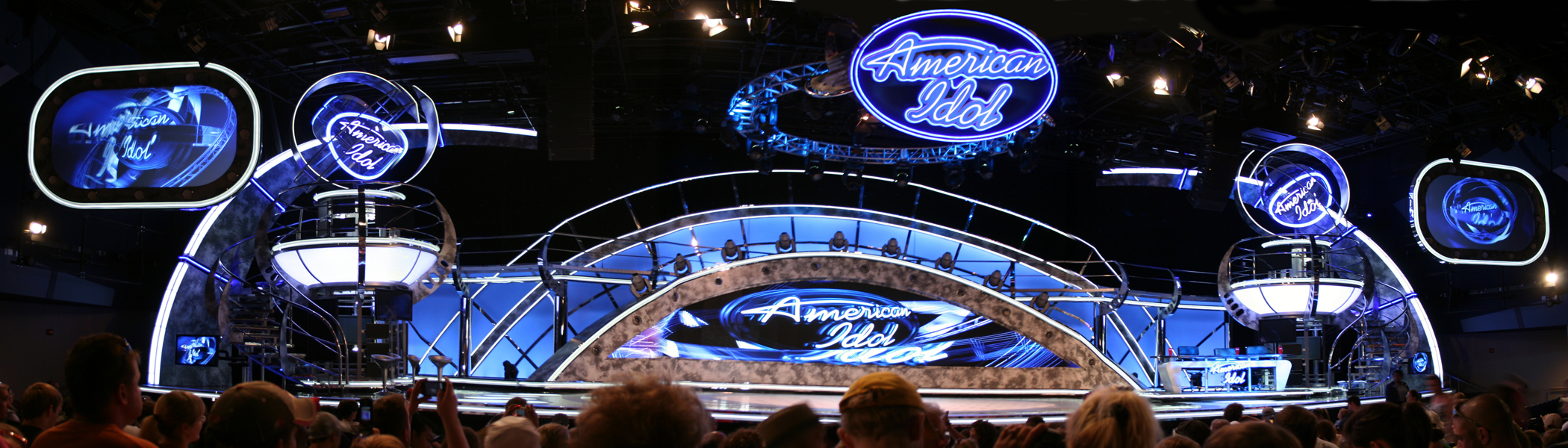
American Idol Experience stage

=== Finale show and "Dream Ticket" ===
The last show of each operating day featured the winners of that day's preliminary shows. Again, the live audience voted for the performer they liked the best. During the show, the audience was prompted to encourage the contestants and heckle the judges. The winner of the last show of the day received a "Dream Ticket", which allowed them to skip the line to during the audition process for an upcoming season of American Idol.

== Winners ==
Fourteenth season semi-finalist Adam Ezegelian was a two-time Dream Ticket winner (2009 and 2014).
