= The Legend of Captain Jack Sparrow (attraction) =

Defunct theme park attraction

Coordinates: 28.356725°N 81.56106°W

Disney's Hollywood Studios
- Area: Animation Courtyard
- Status: Removed
- Opening date: December 6, 2012
- Closing date: November 6, 2014
- Replaced: Journey into Narnia: Prince Caspian
- Replaced by: Toy Story Land

Ride statistics
- Attraction type: Interactive special effects experience
- Designer: Walt Disney Imagineering
- Theme: Pirates of the Caribbean
- Attraction host: Captain Jack Sparrow
- Wheelchair accessible

The Legend of Captain Jack Sparrow was an immersive walk-through special effects attraction in Animation Courtyard at the Hollywood Studios theme park, Walt Disney World. The attraction opened on December 6, 2012. It replaced the Journey into Narnia: Prince Caspian attraction that previously occupied the building.

Guests followed the story of Captain Jack Sparrow, portrayed by Johnny Depp from the Pirates of the Caribbean film series, and experienced several interactive sequences. The Legend of Captain Jack Sparrow closed on November 6, 2014. The building that housed the attraction was demolished for the entrance to Toy Story Land.

== Attraction ==
Guests were taken into an indoor theatre themed to a coastal cove, where they were recruited by a talking skull (voice of James Arnold Taylor) in hopes of becoming part of Captain Jack Sparrow's crew. During the training process, static skeletons are reanimated from the dead, Davy Jones' Kraken appears and mermaids attempt to coax guests by singing sea chants. The talking skull informs the guests that they are ready to partake in Sparrow's crew. Following his words, Jack Sparrow (Johnny Depp) appears via high-definition projection and engages in a battle with Davy Jones, entrusting the newly inducted crew to help. Sparrow manages to defeat Jones by sinking his ship; the Flying Dutchman. Sparrow congratulates the crew and invites them to a celebratory singing of "Yo Ho (A Pirate's Life for Me)". Finally, Sparrow bids the guests farewell and the show concludes.

== See also ==
- Pirates of the Caribbean
