= Voyage of the Little Mermaid =

Defunct live show at Disney's Hollywood Studios

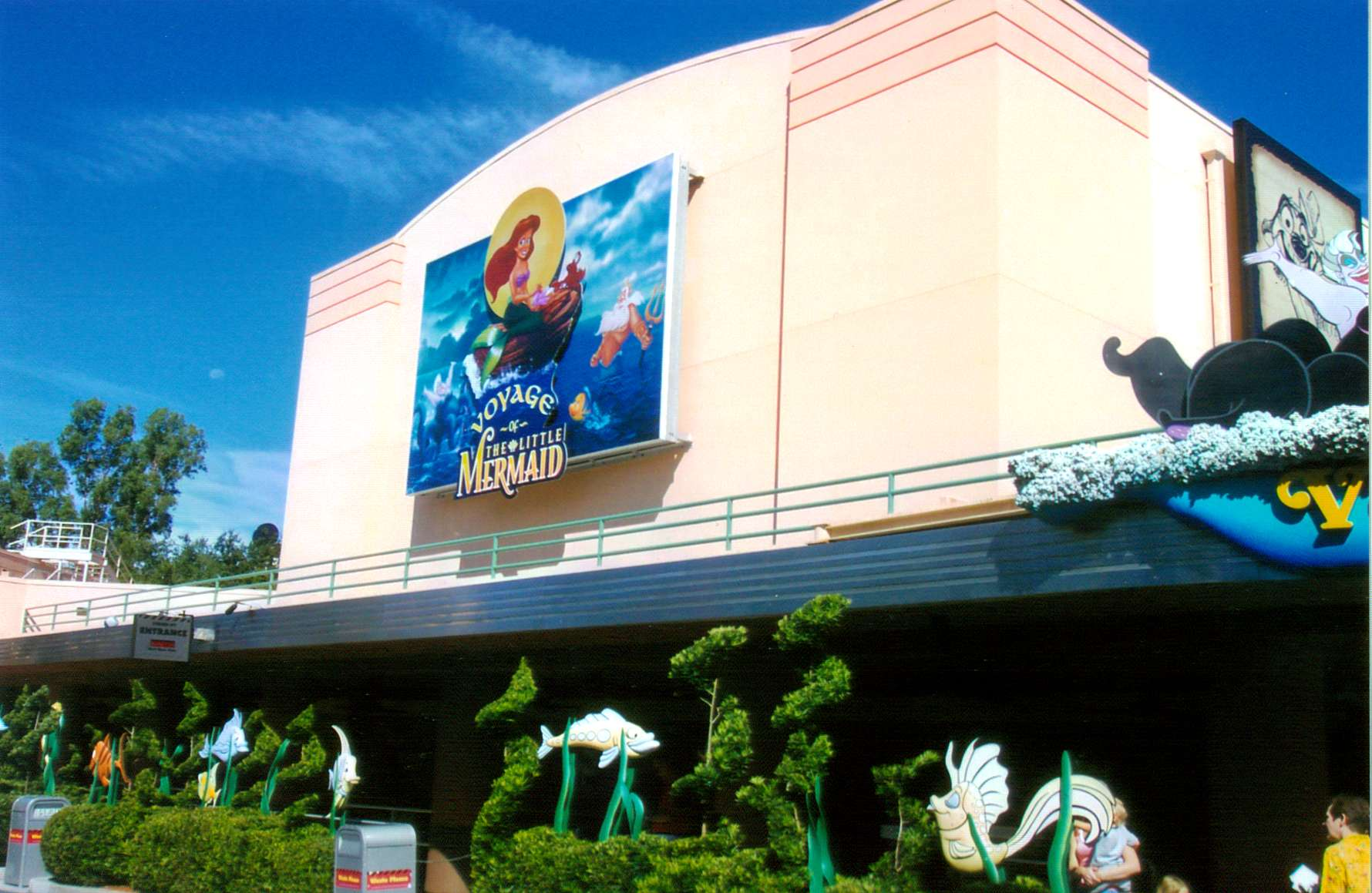

Disney's Hollywood Studios
- Area: Animation Courtyard
- Coordinates: 28°21′27.04″N 81°33′39.5″W
- Status: Removed
- Opening date: January 7, 1992
- Closing date: March 15, 2020
- Replaced: Here Come The Muppets
- Replaced by: The Little Mermaid – A Musical Adventure (The Walt Disney Studios Lot)

Ride statistics
- Attraction type: Live show
- Designer: Walt Disney Creative Entertainment
- Theme: The Little Mermaid
- Music: Alan Menken (music), Howard Ashman (lyrics) & Alan Menken (score)
- Duration: 17 minutes
- Wheelchair accessible
- Assistive listening available

Voyage of the Little Mermaid was a live show attraction at Disney's Hollywood Studios at the Walt Disney World Resort in Florida. The show was an abridgment of the 1989 film The Little Mermaid. Along with a mix of live actors and puppets, the show featured effects such as light and laser projections on the auditorium walls and light rain over the audience. Voice actors included Pat Carroll as Ursula, Jess Harnell as Sebastian, Corey Burton as King Triton, Edan Gross as Flounder, Paddi Edwards as Flotsam and Jetsam, and Frank Welker as Max the Sheepdog. Carroll, Edwards, and Welker reprised their roles from the original film. The show replaced the previous attraction, Here Come The Muppets, on January 7, 1992, in the Animation Courtyard Theater.

On March 15, 2020, Walt Disney World closed due to the COVID-19 pandemic. It was reported that signage for the attraction was removed the following September though Disney claimed that this was simply due to refreshing the sign and that the sign would return the following week. The attraction's puppets were sold the same month. On December 19, 2023, Disney's Hollywood Studios announced its replacement, The Little Mermaid – A Musical Adventure, originally set to open in Fall 2024, confirming the original attraction's permanent closure.

On October 14, 2024, it was announced that the new show was delayed to Summer 2025, eventually opening on May 27, 2025.

== Synopsis ==
The show started out with a preshow following artifacts including King Triton's trident. Then guests entered a theater where the show begins. Due to the special effects that were involved in the attraction, guests were asked to remain seated during the performance. It started with Sebastian singing the Oscar-winning song "Under the Sea", featuring various "black light" puppets, then went into "Part of Your World" after King Triton forbids Ariel from going to the surface, after encountering Flotsam and Jetsam the scene is followed by Ursula singing "Poor Unfortunate Souls". This song was performed by a gigantic puppet, 12 feet tall and 10 feet wide. After Ursula stole Ariel's voice, a montage of the film leading up to the demise of the sea witch is shown. It then goes to the scene where King Triton lets Ariel go with Prince Eric. At the end of the show, a curtain of falling water covers the stage, allowing guests to "return" to the surface. Voyage of the Little Mermaid was located in the Animation Courtyard section.
