= The Little Mermaid – A Musical Adventure =

2025 Disney musical

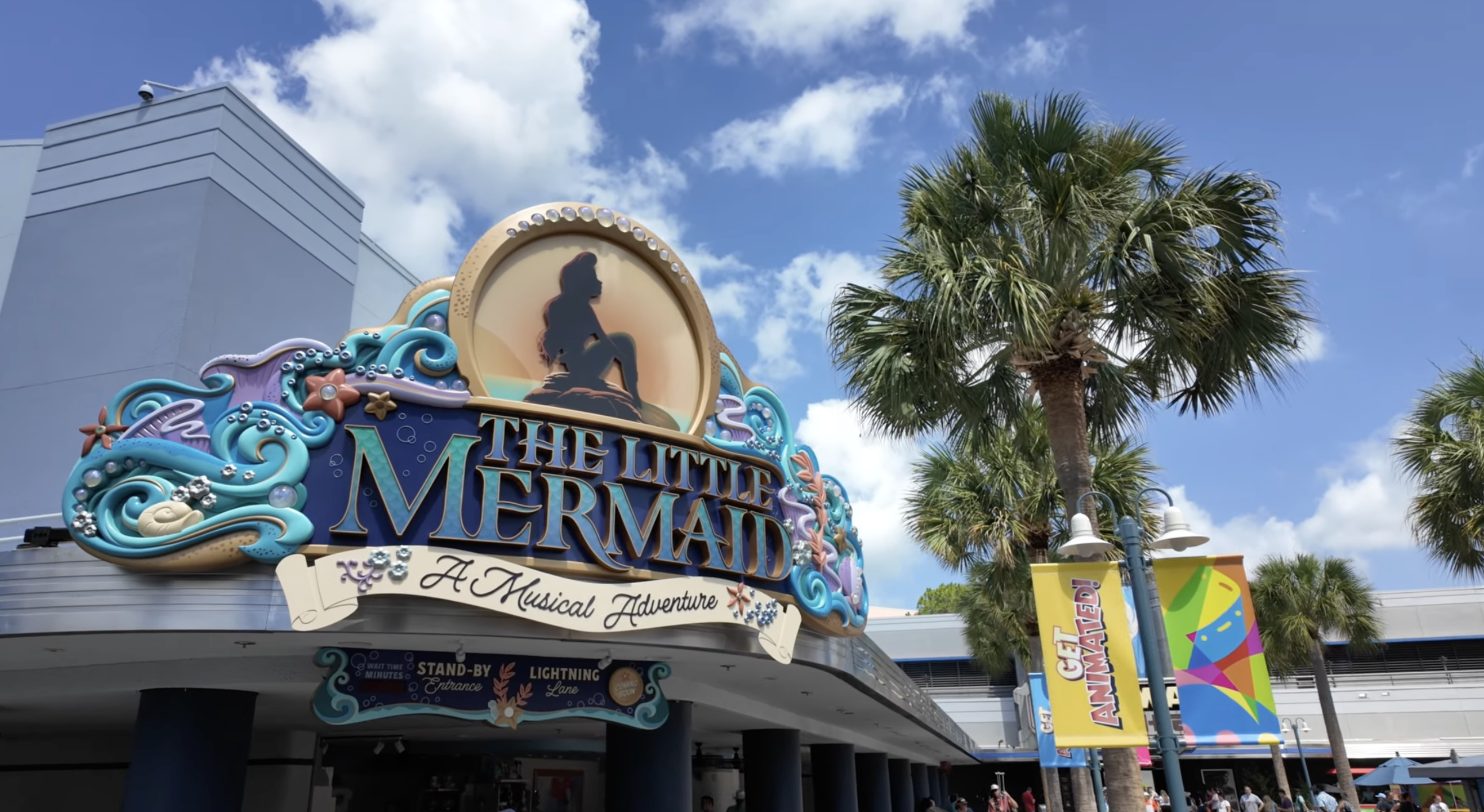

Disney's Hollywood Studios
- Area: Animation Courtyard (2025—2026); Walt Disney Studios (2026—present)
- Coordinates: 28°21′27.04″N 81°33′39.5″W
- Status: Operating
- Opening date: May 27, 2025
- Replaced: Voyage of the Little Mermaid (Animation Courtyard)

Ride statistics
- Attraction type: Live show
- Designer: Disney Live Entertainment
- Theme: The Little Mermaid
- Music: Alan Menken (music), Howard Ashman (lyrics) & Alan Menken (score)
- Wheelchair accessible
- Assistive listening available

The Little Mermaid – A Musical Adventure is a musical stage show production at Disney's Hollywood Studios. It is a fully reimagined production inspired by the 1989 Disney animated feature film The Little Mermaid, replacing the classic Voyage of the Little Mermaid which performed almost three decades. The show was originally set to premiere in Fall 2024. However, on October 14, 2024, it was announced that the show was delayed to May 27, 2025.

== History ==
Following the permanent closure of the classic long-running Voyage of the Little Mermaid show on March 15, 2020, due to the negative effects of the pandemic, it was announced on December 19, 2023, that the show would be replaced by a reimagined show inspired by the animated film in the newly refreshed Animation Courtyard theater at Disney's Hollywood Studios. It was also said that the show would feature new visual innovative plans to completely reimagine the show telling the story of Ariel longing to be part of the human world. In addition to including the "Kiss the Girl" song as seen through concept art, it was also announced that the show would include songs from the film such as "Part of Your World" and "Poor Unfortunate Souls" with an opening date scheduled for fall 2024.

On June 10, 2024, Disney shared a first look at two new puppets that would be used during the musical and that it was confirmed that the show would use all new puppets. One of the puppets revealed in a sneak peek was Max, Prince Eric's pet dog with another one being a sea turtle with a pink and purple shell. It was also confirmed that this puppet would be used in a blacklight sequence like in its predecessor. In addition to this, it was also revealed that the show would use cutting-edge digital imagery motion capture for the characters of King Triton, Ursula, and Ariel's sisters. It was also confirmed that the song "Daughters of Triton" would be included within the show, which the predecessor omitted.

In July 2025, it was announced the attraction was set to become part of Studio Theater in a new land, The Walt Disney Studios Lot, since Animation Courtyard was being permanently closed on September 25, 2025. The voice cast was updated, with Debra Wilson voicing Ursula, Luke Lowe voicing Flounder, Kevin Michael Richardson voicing Sebastian, Jim Cummings voicing King Triton and Corey Burton voicing Flotsam and Jetsam. All actors have voiced their characters in previous works.

== Voice Cast ==
- Debra Wilson - Ursula
- Luke Lowe - Flounder
- Kevin Michael Richardson - Sebastian
- Jim Cummings - King Triton
- Corey Burton - Flotsam & Jetsam

== Show soundtrack ==
- "Daugthers of Triton"
- "Part of Your World"
- "Under the Sea"
- "Poor Unfortunate Souls"
- "Kiss the Girl"

== Synopsis ==
The show begins with the seahorse herald introducing King Triton and Sebastian to begin Atlantica's newest concert. King Triton states that he's excited to see his daughters perform, especially his youngest daughter Ariel. Sebastian begins conducting the orchestra and Triton's daughters perform a short musical number to introduce themselves and Ariel (“Daughters of Triton”). When Ariel's cue comes, she's missing. Triton is furious.

Meanwhile, Ariel arrives at her grotto and shows her best friend, Flounder, her newest treasures. Triton arrives and reprimands Ariel. After he leaves, she laments his misunderstanding of her and sings about her dream to be a part of the human world (“Part of Your World”). Meanwhile on land, Prince Eric tells his dog, Max, that he's holding off on marriage until he finds a girl he truly loves.

Sebastian arrives and reprimands Ariel for her infatuation with humans before showing her why life is better in the ocean with the help of many aquatic animals (“Under The Sea”). Meanwhile, Ursula, the infamous sea witch, plots to use Ariel as a pawn to take down Triton. The eels Flotsam and Jetsam lure Ariel to Ursula's lair where she manipulates Ariel into signing a contract that tethers her to Ursula's plan. Ariel must get true love's kiss from Eric in 3 days or she will become Ursula's slave. As payment, Ursula takes Ariel's voice before transforming her into a human (“Poor Unfortunate Souls”).

On the final night before the day Ariel needs to succeed, she and Eric explore the nearby lagoon by boat. Sebastian, Flounder, and a collection of animals in the lagoon serenade them (“Kiss The Girl”). The two almost kiss but Flotsam and Jetsam tip their boat over. Enraged by Ariel's progress, Ursula breaks the seashell with her voice inside and turns her back into a mermaid. As the sun sets Ursula, now with Triton's trident, grows giant. She conjures a typhoon and through the darkness the audience sees flashes of Ariel and Eric attempting to rescue each other. Eric is able to board a sunken ship and steer it into Ursula, killing her.

The next morning, Ariel laments over an unconscious Eric that she can't achieve her dream. Triton and Sebastian observe, and Triton realizes he needs to let his daughter go. He transforms Ariel into a human permanently, and apologizes for not listening. Ariel forgives him before Eric regains consciousness and they reunite. The show ends with Triton casting a rainbow over land and sea.
