= Lightning McQueen's Racing Academy =

Show attraction in Sunset Boulevard at Disney's Hollywood Studios

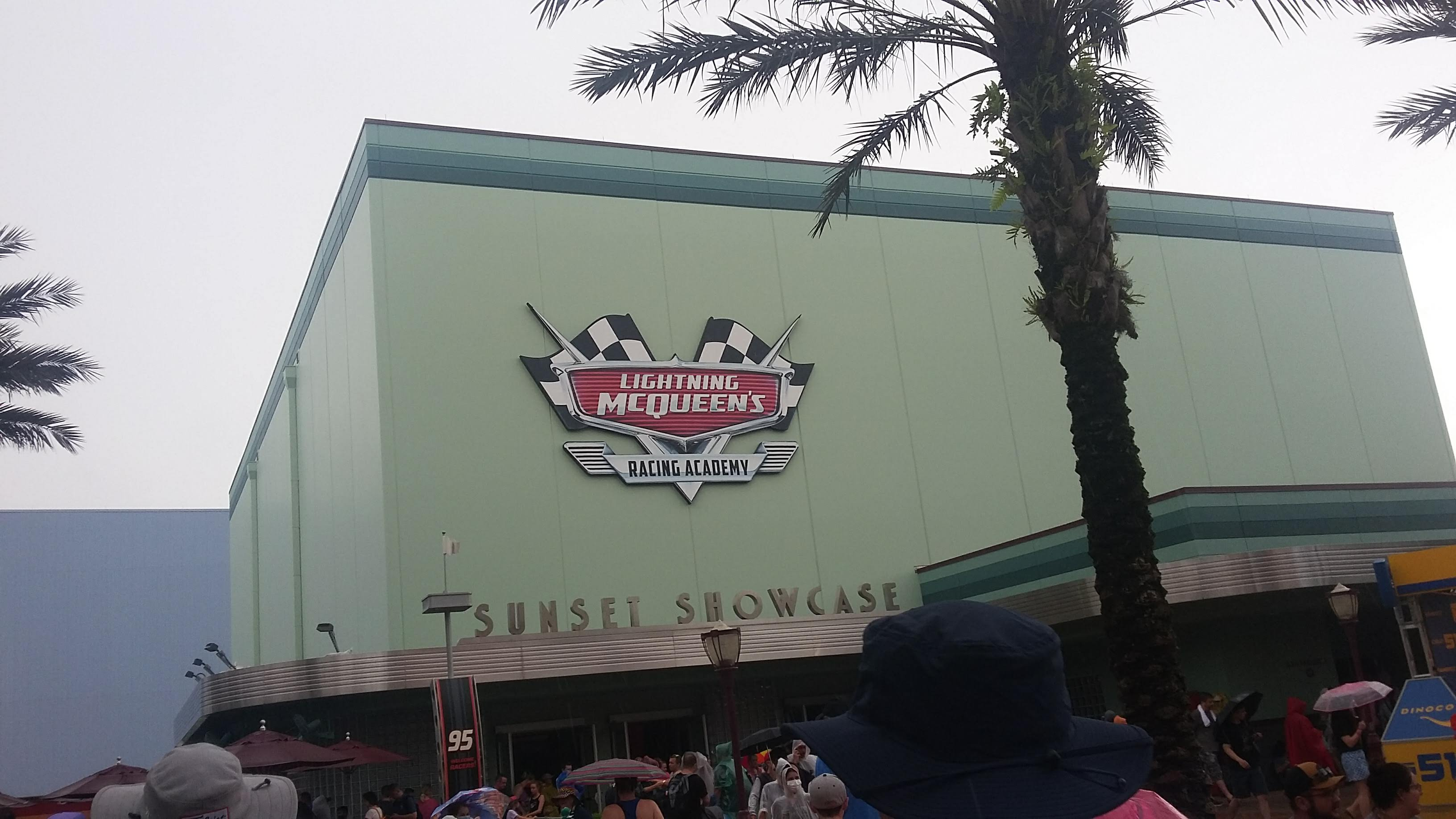

Disney's Hollywood Studios
- Area: Sunset Boulevard
- Status: Removed
- Opening date: March 31, 2019
- Closing date: October 7, 2024
- Replaced: Club Villain
- Replaced by: Disney Villains: Unfairly Ever After

Ride statistics
- Attraction type: Live show
- Designer: Walt Disney Imagineering
- Theme: Cars
- Duration: 10:00
- Host: Lightning McQueen
- Wheelchair accessible
- Assistive listening available

Lightning McQueen's Racing Academy was a show attraction based on the Cars franchise in Sunset Boulevard at Disney's Hollywood Studios, which opened on March 31, 2019, as part of the park's 30th anniversary celebration. The show took place after the events of Cars 3.

The show was housed in Sunset Showcase Theater near Rock 'n' Roller Coaster Starring Aerosmith. On September 3, 2024, it was announced that the show would close on October 7, 2024, to make way for an all-new Disney Villains-themed stage show, Disney Villains: Unfairly Ever After, which opened on May 27, 2025.

== Voice cast ==
- Owen Wilson as Lightning McQueen
- Larry the Cable Guy as Tow Mater
- Bonnie Hunt as Sally Carrera
- Cristela Alonzo as Cruz Ramirez
- Bob Peterson as Chick Hicks
- John Ratzenberger as Mack
- Tony Shalhoub as Luigi
- Lloyd Sherr as Fillmore
- Jenifer Lewis as Flo
- Lea DeLaria as Miss Fritter

== Show summary ==
During the 10-minute show, guests took on the role of "rookie racer" as they entered the theater and watched a Lightning McQueen animatronic on stage. The audience was enveloped by a giant, wrap-around screen that was nearly two stories tall and stretched more than 200 feet from end to end.

Lightning was anxious to show what he's learned over the years, but his main rival Chick Hicks hacked into the simulator system to humiliate him. Mater, Cruz Ramirez and Lightning's friends from Radiator Springs chimed in with their support, as Lightning geared up for a challenge to settle the score with Chick Hicks in a virtual simulator race.

In the courtyard outside the attraction, guests could meet Cruz Ramirez and joined DJ's Dance Party, relocated from Cars Land at Disney California Adventure.
