= For the First Time in Forever: A Frozen Sing-Along Celebration =

Live show based on the 2013 animated film, Frozen

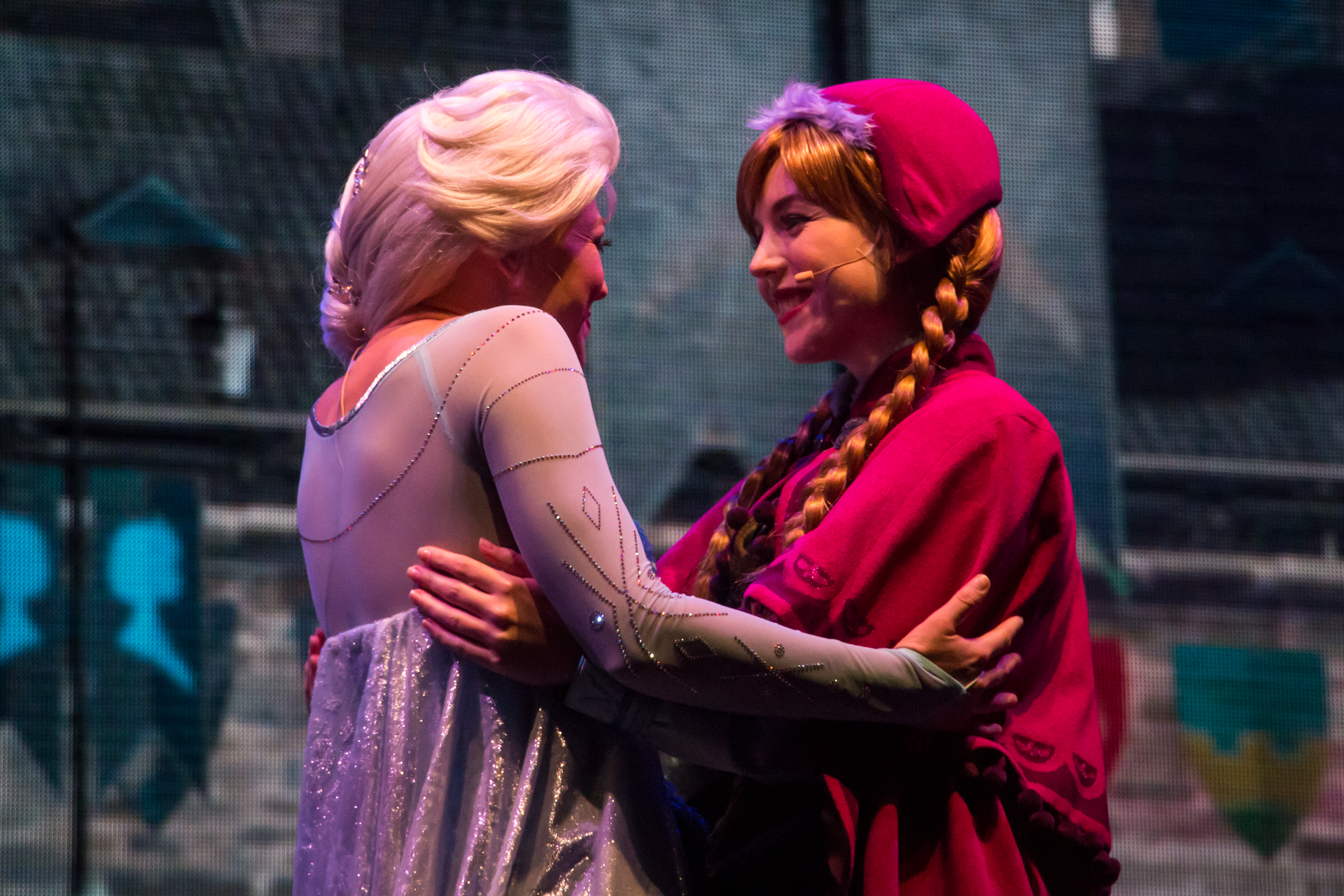
- Elsa and Anna, during the show's finale

Disney's Hollywood Studios
- Area: Street of America (2014–2015); Echo Lake (2015–Present)
- Coordinates: 28°21′23.45″N 81°33′34.59″W
- Status: Operating
- Opening date: July 5, 2014
- Replaced: The American Idol Experience
- Lightning Lane available

Disney California Adventure
- Area: Hollywood Land
- Coordinates: 33.8078239°N 117.9182662°W
- Status: Removed
- Opening date: January 7, 2015
- Closing date: April 17, 2016
- Replaced: Muppet*Vision 3D
- Replaced by: Mickey's PhilharMagic

Disneyland Park (Paris)
- Name: Chantons La Reine des Neiges
- Area: Frontierland
- Status: Removed
- Opening date: June 1, 2015
- Closing date: January 7, 2018
- Replaced: Tarzan: The Encounter

Hong Kong Disneyland
- Name: Frozen Festival Show
- Area: The Pavilion
- Status: Removed
- Opening date: June 11, 2015
- Closing date: October 4, 2015

Shanghai Disneyland Park
- Name: Frozen: A Sing-Along Celebration
- Area: Fantasyland
- Status: Operating
- Opening date: June 16, 2016

Ride statistics
- Attraction type: Live stage show
- Designer: Walt Disney Creative Entertainment
- Theme: Frozen; Olaf's Frozen Adventure (Christmastime; Florida)
- Music: Songs composed by Kristen Anderson-Lopez and Robert Lopez; Score composed by Christophe Beck
- Duration: 30 minutes
- Show hosts: Aria and Erik
- Wheelchair accessible
- Assistive listening available
- Closed captioning available

For the First Time in Forever: A Frozen Sing-Along Celebration is a musical show based on Disney Animation's 2013 computer-animated musical feature film Frozen and the songs from the film, located at Disney's Hollywood Studios and Shanghai Disneyland Park, as well as the 2026 Alaskan voyages aboard the Disney Magic and the Disney Wonder. It was also formerly hosted at Disney California Adventure, Disneyland Park in Paris, and Hong Kong Disneyland. The show is presented as a recounting of the plot of Frozen as told by the official Arendelle historians, with appearances from Princess Anna of Arendelle, Kristoff and Queen Elsa of Arendelle, while Olaf additionally appears during the Christmastime version of the show in Florida.

== Disney's Hollywood Studios version ==
The show premiered at the Premiere Theater in the Streets of America section of Disney's Hollywood Studios on July 5, 2014, during the 2014 Frozen Summer Fun. The show moved into its current location at the Hyperion Theater in Echo Lake on June 17, 2015, the former home of The American Idol Experience.

On July 25, 2020, since Walt Disney World reopened due to the COVID-19 pandemic, all stage shows such as Finding Nemo - The Musical, Indiana Jones Epic Stunt Spectacular, Beauty and the Beast Live on Stage, and Festival of the Lion King had not returned due to a dispute between the Actors' Equity Association and Walt Disney World. On September 26, 2020, For the First Time in Forever: A Frozen Sing-along Celebration returned to Disney's Hollywood Studios, reopening on October 5, 2020.

During the Christmas season, the show adds five minutes to include an appearance from Olaf singing "That Time of Year" from the 2017 animated featurette, Olaf's Frozen Adventure.

=== Disney Cruise Line ===
An exact production of the Hollywood Studios version of the show takes place during the 2026 Alaskan voyages, during the glacier viewing day of the itinerary, aboard the Disney Magic and Disney Wonder ships of Disney Cruise Line on the midship ninth deck Funnel Vision pool stage.

=== Disney Jollywood Nights ===
On November 12, 2023, Disney's Hollywood Studios announced a new show, What's This? Tim Burton's The Nightmare Before Christmas Sing-Along, which would be performed evenings in the Hyperion Theater, during the new annual Disney Jollywood Nights holiday event, while For the First Time in Forever would continue to run during daytime park hours on days when Jollywood Nights takes place, during the holidays.

== Disney California Adventure version ==
On January 7, 2015, the Muppet*Vision 3D theater in Hollywood Land at Disney California Adventure began operating as the Crown Jewel Theater and presented the show as part of the park's "Frozen Fun" event. Although the event officially ended on May 15, 2015, the venue held the Frozen sing-along show until April 17, 2016. It was then closed, and the theater was renamed the Sunset Showcase Theater with a movie preview in May 2016. Since April 2019, the Sunset Showcase Theater has been showing Mickey's PhilharMagic.

== Disneyland Paris version ==
The stage is in The Chaparral Theater in Frontierland under Chantons La Reine des Neiges, the first version featuring Olaf. Shows run several times daily with separate French- and English-language presentations. It first ran from June 1 to September 13, 2015, as the summer event, but was scheduled to return on November 14, as part of the Christmas event. (Note: As of February 9, 2015, the official Disneyland Paris website does not feature the show. This does not mean the attraction closed on that day, but that it closed prior to or before that day.) However, due to a terrorist attack in Paris on November 13, 2015, both Disneyland Paris and Walt Disney Studios Park were closed from November 14 until November 18. The show ran with several seasonal breaks until January 2018, when it was eventually closed. The theatre now hosts The Lion King: Rhythm of the Pridelands.

== Hong Kong Disneyland version ==
Hong Kong Disneyland features an almost identical show named Frozen Festival Show. The stage is located in the "Black Box" space known as "The Pavilion," between Adventureland and Grizzly Gulch, also the former home of "The Revenge of the Headless Horseman," an exclusive walk-through attraction for the Haunted Halloween event from 2011-2014. It was run from June 11, 2015. Although the event officially ended on August 30, the show continued until October 4.

== Shanghai Disneyland version ==
The stage is located in The Evergreen Playhouse in Fantasyland. This was the first Frozen sing-along show that would not open for a seasonal event. In November 2019, it featured songs from the sequel, Frozen II.
