= Journey into Narnia: Prince Caspian =

Amusement park ride (walk-through)

Coordinates: 28.356725°N 81.56106°W

Disney's Hollywood Studios
- Area: Animation Courtyard
- Status: Removed
- Opening date: June 27, 2008
- Closing date: September 10, 2011
- Replaced: Journey into Narnia: Creating The Lion, the Witch, and the Wardrobe
- Replaced by: The Legend of Captain Jack Sparrow

Ride statistics
- Attraction type: Walk-in Show
- Designer: Walt Disney Imagineering
- Theme: The Chronicles of Narnia
- Wheelchair accessible
- Assistive listening available
- Closed captioning available

Journey into Narnia: Prince Caspian was a walk-through style attraction in Animation Courtyard at the Hollywood Studios theme park, Walt Disney World. The attraction opened on June 27, 2008. It replaced Journey into Narnia: Creating The Lion, the Witch, and the Wardrobe, which closed on January 1, 2008.

== Summary ==
The queue displayed Narnia-related trivia questions on screens. Guests then entered the pre-show area, where they viewed behind-the-scenes footage featuring the film's director, Andrew Adamson.

Passing through a rockwork archway, guests then entered "Aslan's Stone Table Chamber," the underground vault of stone carvings where Aslan sacrificed himself in the first movie, The Chronicles of Narnia: The Lion, the Witch, and the Wardrobe.

There guests saw a short edited clip from the movie. Multiple screens, dimensional sound and in-theater effects enhanced the scene of Peter and Edmond's temptation to use the power of the White Witch against King Miraz to win back Caspian's place on the throne.

Finally, the walkthrough concluded with a look at the concept art and storyboards from the film's production, as well as some of the actual props and costumes used by the cast and crew.

== Closure ==
"Journey into Narnia: Prince Caspian" closed on September 10, 2011. The attraction was replaced by The Legend Of Captain Jack Sparrow, which opened on December 6, 2012.
