= Journey into Narnia: Creating The Lion, the Witch, and the Wardrobe =

American theme park attraction, 2005–2008

Disney's Hollywood Studios
- Area: Animation Courtyard
- Status: Removed
- Opening date: December 9, 2005
- Closing date: January 1, 2008
- Replaced: The Making of The Haunted Mansion Movie
- Replaced by: Journey into Narnia: Prince Caspian

Ride statistics
- Attraction type: Walk-in Show
- Designer: Walt Disney Imagineering
- Theme: The Chronicles of Narnia
- Wheelchair accessible
- Assistive listening available
- Closed captioning available

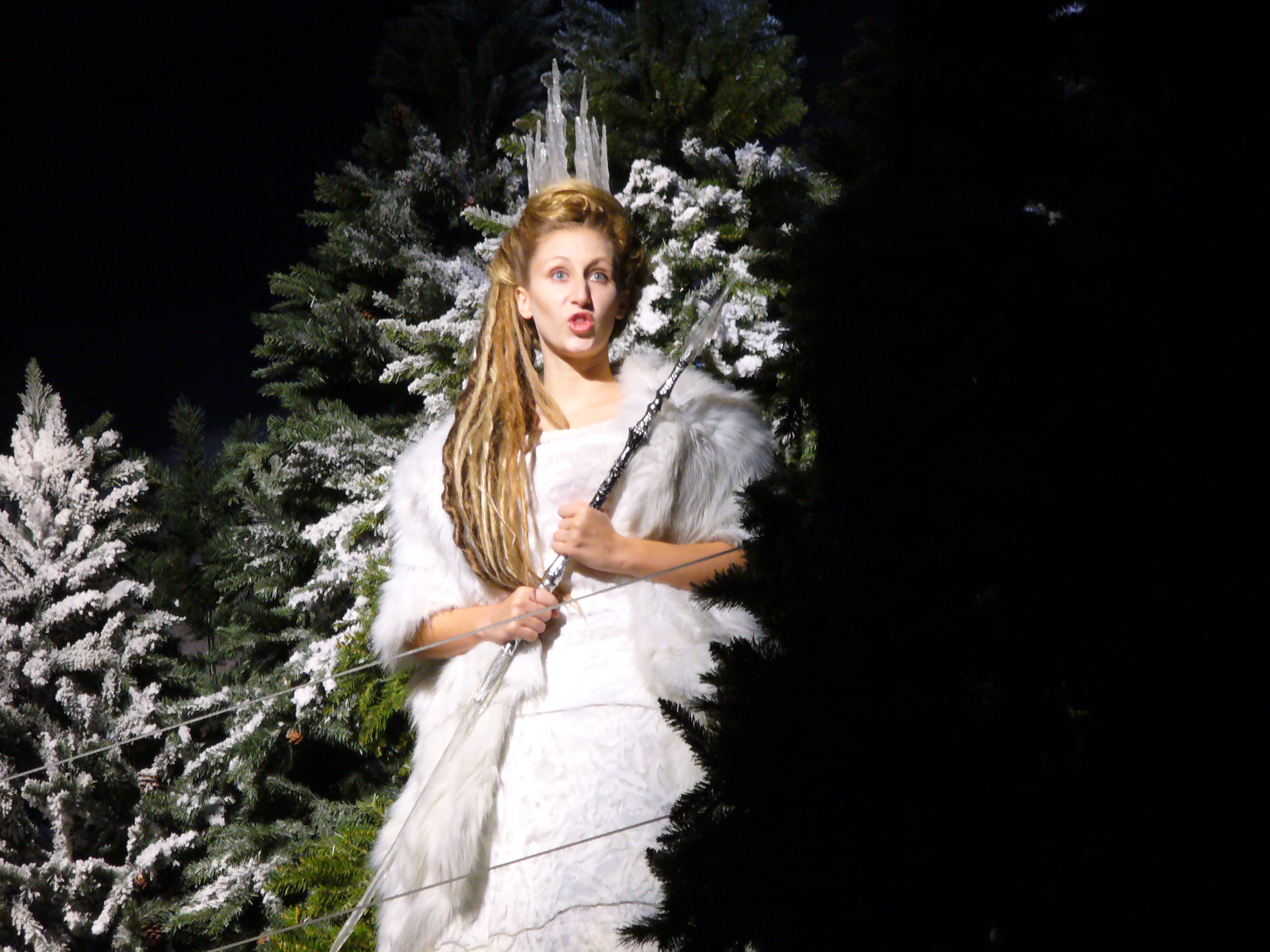
Jadis, the White Witch, appeared live off-screen during the abridged feature film.

Journey into Narnia: The Lion, the Witch, and the Wardrobe was a walk through attraction in Animation Courtyard at the Hollywood Studios theme park, Walt Disney World, that operated from December 9, 2005, to January 1, 2008. It was a "stand and watch" attraction, with a live appearance by the White Witch character and ended with a display of several costumes from the film.

== Summary ==
Guests were led into an antechamber with a Wardrobe prop "entrance". The audience was then led through the wardrobe doors into a large room adorned with flocked pine trees, a lamppost, a large tree illuminated with fiber optics, and a large (150") projection television screen. The screen displayed a greatly abridged version of The Chronicles of Narnia: The Lion, the Witch and the Wardrobe, the 2005 feature film co-produced by Disney and Walden Media.

At a key point in the abridged film, the White Witch appeared on a terrace above the crowd and read a few lines from the film. The abridged film then continued on-screen, followed by a short preview of The Chronicles of Narnia: Prince Caspian, the second Narnia feature film, which was to be released in 2008. None of the material shown on-screen was exclusive — all could be found in the DVD edition of The Lion, the Witch, and the Wardrobe or in online previews of Prince Caspian. After standing and watching for 10 to 15 minutes, the audience exited through a hallway that was decorated with several costumes from the film.

== History ==
The attraction closed permanently on January 1, 2008, so it could be converted into the new attraction, Journey into Narnia: Prince Caspian, which officially opened on June 27, 2008, which has subsequently since closed.

In 2003, this attraction's area was used to house The Making of The Haunted Mansion Movie attraction. Before that, the building (Soundstage 4) housed set from the live-action version of 101 Dalmatians from 1996 to 2002.
