= Mickey Mouse (TV series) =

American animated television series

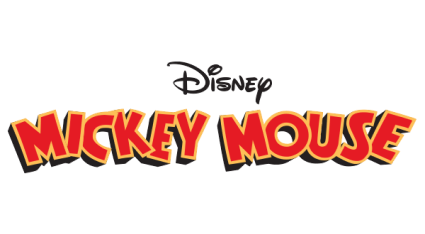
- Also known as: Mickey Mouse Shorts
- Genre: Comedy; Slapstick
- Created by: Paul Rudish
- Based on: Mickey Mouse by Walt Disney; Ub Iwerks
- Developed by: Paul Rudish
- Voices of: Chris Diamantopoulos; Russi Taylor; Tony Anselmo; Bill Farmer; Tress MacNeille; Jim Cummings; Corey Burton; April Winchell; Alan Young; John Kassir; Dave Wasson
- Composer: Christopher Willis
- Country of origin: United States
- Original language: English
- No. of seasons: 5
- No. of episodes: 94 (+ 2 special episodes) (list of episodes)

Production
- Executive producer: Paul Rudish
- Animator: Mercury Filmworks
- Editors: Illya Owens; Tony Molina
- Running time: 3–4 minutes (87 episodes); 7 minutes (7 episodes); 22 minutes (2 specials)
- Production company: Disney Television Animation

Original release
- Network: Disney Channel
- Release: June 28, 2013 – July 20, 2019

Related
- Have a Laugh! (2009–2012); The Wonderful World of Mickey Mouse (2020–2023)

Mickey Mouse (also known as Mickey Mouse Shorts) is an American animated television series produced by Disney Television Animation. Featuring Disney cartoon characters Mickey Mouse, Minnie Mouse, Donald Duck, Daisy Duck, Goofy and Pluto in contemporary settings such as Paris, Venice, Tokyo and New York, the series has the slapstick feel of the earliest Mickey Mouse shorts while providing a modern update, and "presents Mickey in a broad range of humorous situations that showcase his pluck and rascality, along with his long-beloved charm and good heartedness". The animation is provided by Mercury Filmworks.

The series was created and developed by artist Paul Rudish, who was the co-creator of the Cartoon Network television series Sym-Bionic Titan and is also the series' executive producer and supervising director, while Joseph Holt is the series' art director. Chris Diamantopoulos was cast instead of Bret Iwan, because the producers wanted a voice that sounded similar to the one used by Walt Disney for Walt's portrayal of Mickey. Paul Rudish, Jenny Gase-Baker and Joseph Holt won three Emmy Awards for their work on the series in September 2013.

The pilot episode, "Croissant de Triomphe", was first released as a special preview on March 12, 2013, on Disney.com. The series officially premiered on June 28 of that year on Disney Channel, followed by the releases on Disney.com and Watch Disney Channel. A total of 18 episodes aired in the first season while the second season, premiering on April 11, 2014, consisted of 19 episodes. The third season premiered on July 17, 2015, with 20 episodes aired. The fourth season premiered on June 9, 2017, with 19 episodes aired. The fifth and final season of the original series premiered on October 6, 2018, with 18 episodes aired.

The series was succeeded with The Wonderful World of Mickey Mouse, which premiered on Disney+, on November 18, 2020, to coincide with Mickey's 92nd birthday.

== Voice cast ==
Mickey Mouse, as he appears in the series.

- Chris Diamantopoulos as Mickey Mouse and Morty and Ferdie Fieldmouse
- Russi Taylor as Minnie Mouse and Huey, Dewey, and Louie
- Tony Anselmo as Donald Duck
- Bill Farmer as Goofy and Pluto
- Tress MacNeille as Daisy Duck and Chip
- Jim Cummings as Pete
- Corey Burton as Ludwig Von Drake and Dale
- April Winchell as Clarabelle Cow
- Alan Young (2015–16) and John Kassir (2016–18) as Scrooge McDuck

== Cameos ==
- Yeti from Matterhorn Bobsleds appears in "Yodelberg"
- Cinderella and Prince Charming from Cinderella appear in "Croissant de Triomphe"
- Casey Junior, Dumbo, Timothy Q. Mouse and the Crows from Dumbo appear in "New Shoes"
- King Candy's name from Wreck-It Ralph
- Horace Horsecollar
- Clara Cluck
- Luxo Ball from Luxo Jr.
- Lady, Tramp and Peg from Lady and the Tramp
- Glut the Shark, Sebastian and his Band from The Little Mermaid
- Belle, the Beast and Sultan from Beauty and the Beast
- José Carioca from Saludos Amigos
- Panchito Pistoles from The Three Caballeros
- Buzzie, Flaps, Dizzie and Ziggy, King Louie, Flunkey and his Monkeys from The Jungle Book appear in "Mumbai Madness"
- Snow White, her Dwarfs, and the Evil Queen from Snow White and the Seven Dwarfs
- Eeyore's Tail and Winnie the Pooh's Honey from the Winnie the Pooh franchise
- Pinocchio, Geppetto and Monstro from Pinocchio
- Teenagers from All the Cats Join In appear in "Couple Sweaters"
- Beagle Boys appear in "Sock Burglar" and "Touchdown and Out"
- The Phantom Blot appears in "Sock Burglar"
- Big Bad Wolf from Three Little Pigs appears in "Sock Burglar" and "The Perfect Dream"
- The names of Fantasia 2000 and Pumbaa from The Lion King
- Thumper and Bambi from his film
- Gus Goose
- Oswald the Lucky Rabbit
- Chernabog from Fantasia appears in "Touchdown and Out" and "The Scariest Story Ever"
- The Ostriches from Fantasia appear in "Carnaval"
- Martian Robot from Mickey Mouse Works appears in "Feed the Birds"
- Walt Disney
- Jafar from Aladdin appears in "Feed the Birds"
- Mary Poppins, Penguin Waiters and Jolly Holiday Farm Animals from Mary Poppins
- Raja the Tiger from Goliath II
- Fifer Pig, Fiddler Pig and Practical Pig from Three Little Pigs appear in "No"
- Humphrey the Bear
- Destiny from Enchanted
- The King from Brave Little Tailor appears in "Roll 'em"
- Wolf Arrowmen from Robin Hood appear in "Roll 'em"
- Martian Mastermind from Mars and Beyond appears in "Roll 'em"
- Young Tantor and his mother from Tarzan
- A VHS copy of The Black Cauldron
- Nana from Peter Pan appears in "You, Me and Fifi"
- Copper from The Fox and the Hound appears in "You, Me and Fifi"
- Pongo from One Hundred and One Dalmatians appears in "You, Me and Fifi"
- Tito from Oliver & Company appears in "You, Me and Fifi"
- Three Little Wolves from their short film
- Max Hare and Toby Tortoise from The Tortoise and the Hare

== Episodes ==
Season	Episodes	Originally released	
Season	Episodes	First released	Last released
1	18	June 28, 2013	March 7, 2014
2	19	April 11, 2014	June 9, 2015
3	20	July 17, 2015	July 29, 2016
Specials	2	December 9, 2016	October 8, 2017
4	19	June 9, 2017	July 14, 2018
5	18	October 6, 2018	July 20, 2019

== Broadcast ==
As of March 2014, a total of 100 million viewers in the United States had seen the series, and it was airing in 160 countries. As of June 2014, the show, translated in 34 languages, had reached over 135 million viewers worldwide.

== Home media ==
DVD releases
Title	Season(s)	Episodes	Total running time	Release date
Title	Season(s)	Episodes	Total running time	Region 1
The Complete First Season	1–2	19 (1–18, 22)	1 hour, 15 minutes	August 26, 2014
Merry and Scary	1–3	7 (10, 27, 43, 54, 56, 58, 67)	43 minutes	August 29, 2017

Digital purchase
Season		Episodes	Release number	Episode count
1	2013–14	18	1	9
1	2013–14	18	2	10
2	2014–15	19	2	10
2	2014–15	19	3	10
2	2014–15	19	4	10
3	2015–16	20	4	10
3	2015–16	20	5	9
3	2015–16	20	6	9
4	2017–18	19	7	10
4	2017–18	19	8	9
5	2018–19	18	9	9
5	2018–19	18	10	9

== Awards and nominations ==
Year	Award	Category	Nominee	Result
2013	Primetime Emmy Award	Outstanding Short Form Animated Program	For "Croissant de Triomphe"	Won
2013	Primetime Emmy Award	Outstanding Individual Achievements In Animation	For Jenny Gase-Baker in Background Painting, "Croissant de Triomphe"	Won
2013	Primetime Emmy Award	Outstanding Individual Achievements In Animation	For Joseph Holt for Art Direction, "Croissant de Triomphe"	Won
2013	National Cartoonists Society Division Awards	Television Animation Award	Paul Rudish	Won
2014	Annie Awards	Character Design in an Animated TV/Broadcast Production	Paul Rudish	Won
2014	Annie Awards	Outstanding Achievement, Music in an Animated TV/Broadcast Production	Christopher Willis	Won
2014	Annie Awards	Outstanding Achievement, Editorial in an Animated TV/Broadcast Production	Illya Owens	Won
2014	Annie Awards	Outstanding Achievement, Directing in an Animated TV/Broadcast Production	Aaron Springer	Nominated
2014	Annie Awards	Outstanding Achievement, Storyboarding in an Animated TV/Broadcast Production	Alonso Ramos-Ramirez	Nominated
2014	Annie Awards	Outstanding Achievement, Voice Acting in an Animated TV/Broadcast Production	Bill Farmer as Goofy	Nominated
2014	Annie Awards	Outstanding Achievement, Voice Acting in an Animated TV/Broadcast Production	Chris Diamantopoulos as Mickey Mouse	Nominated
2014	Primetime Emmy Award	Outstanding Short-format Animated Program	For "'O Sole Minnie'"	Won
2014	Primetime Emmy Award	Outstanding Character Voice-Over Performance	Chris Diamantopoulos as Mickey Mouse, "The Adorable Couple"	Nominated
2014	Primetime Emmy Award	Outstanding Individual Achievements In Animation	Narina Sokolova, background designer, "O Sole Minnie"	Won
2014	Primetime Emmy Award	Outstanding Individual Achievements In Animation	Valerio Vaentura, background designer, "The Adorable Couple"	Won
2015	Annie Awards	Outstanding Achievement, Character Design in an Animated TV/Broadcast Production	Andy Suriano	Nominated
2015	Annie Awards	Outstanding Achievement, Directing in an Animated TV/Broadcast Production	Aaron Springer	Won
2015	Annie Awards	Outstanding Achievement, Music in an Animated TV/Broadcast Production	Christopher Willis	Won
2015	Annie Awards	Outstanding Achievement, Production Design in an Animated TV/Broadcast Production	Joseph Holt	Nominated
2015	Annie Awards	Outstanding Achievement, Production Design in an Animated TV/Broadcast Production	Narina Sokolova	Won
2015	Annie Awards	Outstanding Achievement, Storyboarding in an Animated TV/Broadcast Production	Heiko Drengenberg	Nominated
2015	Annie Awards	Outstanding Achievement, Voice Acting in an Animated TV/Broadcast Production	Bill Farmer as Goofy and Grandma, "Goofy's Grandma"	Won
2015	Annie Awards	Outstanding Achievement, Writing in an Animated TV/Broadcast Production	Darrick Bachman	Won
2015	Annie Awards	Outstanding Achievement, Editorial in an Animated TV/Broadcast Production	Illya Owens	Won
2015	Annecy International Animation Film Festival	TV series	For "Eau de Minnie"	Nominated
2015	Primetime Creative Arts Emmy Awards	Outstanding Short-Format Animated Program	For "Mumbai Madness"	Nominated
2016	Annie Awards	Outstanding Achievement, Directing in an Animated TV/Broadcast Production	Dave Wasson for "Coned"	Nominated
2016	Annie Awards	Outstanding Achievement, Directing in an Animated TV/Broadcast Production	Heiko Dregenberg for "Bottle Shocked"	Nominated
2016	Annie Awards	Outstanding Music in an Animated TV/Broadcast Production	Christopher Willis for "¡Feliz Cumpleaños!"	Won
2016	Annie Awards	Outstanding Achievement, Storyboarding in an Animated TV/Broadcast Production	Alonso Ramirez Ramos for "¡Feliz Cumpleaños!"	Won
2016	Annie Awards	Outstanding Achievement, Editorial in an Animated TV/Broadcast Production	Illya Owens for "Coned"	Won
2017	Annie Awards	Outstanding Achievement, Music in an Animated TV/Broadcast Production	Christopher Willis for "Dancevidaniya"	Nominated
2017	Annie Awards	Outstanding Achievement, Storyboarding in an Animated TV/Broadcast Production	Heiko Von Drengenberg for "Road Hogs"	Nominated
2017	Annie Awards	Outstanding Achievement, Editorial in an Animated TV/Broadcast Production	Illya Owens for "Sock Burglar"	Won
2017	Primetime Emmy Award	Outstanding Short Form Animated Program	"Split Decisions"	Nominated
2017	Primetime Emmy Award	Outstanding Original Music and Lyrics	"Jing-a-Ling-a-Ling"; Christopher Willis (music & lyrics); Darrick Bachman (lyrics); Paul Rudish (lyrics) (Episode: "Duck the Halls: A Mickey Mouse Christmas Special")	Nominated
2018	Annie Awards	Outstanding Achievement for Directing in an Animated Television / Broadcast Production	Dave Wasson, Eddie Trigueros, and Alonso Ramirez-Ramos for "The Scariest Story Ever: A Mickey Mouse Halloween Spooktacular!"	Won
2018	Annie Awards	Outstanding Achievement for Music in an Animated Television / Broadcast Production	Christopher Willis for "The Scariest Story Ever: A Mickey Mouse Halloween Spooktacular!"	Won
2018	Annie Awards	Outstanding Achievement for Storyboarding in an Animated Television / Broadcast Production	Eddie Trigueros for "Bee Inspired"	Won
2018	Annie Awards	Outstanding Achievement for Production Design in an Animated Television / Broadcast Production	Jenny Gase-Baker and Justin Martin for "The Scariest Story Ever: A Mickey Mouse Halloween Spooktacular!"	Nominated
2018	Annie Awards	Outstanding Voice Acting in an Animated Television / Broadcast Production	Chris Diamantopoulos as Mickey Mouse, "The Scariest Story Ever: A Mickey Mouse Halloween Spooktacular!"	Nominated
2018	Annie Awards	Outstanding Achievement for Writing in an Animated Television / Broadcast Production	Darrick Bachman for "Locked in Love"	Nominated
2018	Daytime Emmy Awards	Outstanding Directing in an Animated Program	Alonso Ramirez-Ramos	Nominated
2018	Primetime Emmy Awards	Outstanding Individual Achievements In Animation	Justin Martin, background designer, "The Scariest Story Ever: A Mickey Mouse Halloween Spooktacular"	Won
2018	Primetime Emmy Awards	Outstanding Character Voice-Over Performance	Russi Taylor as Huey/Dewey/Louie/Grandma/The Witch and Minnie Mouse, "The Scariest Story Ever: A Mickey Mouse Halloween Spooktacular"	Nominated
2019	Annie Awards	Outstanding Achievement for Directing in an Animated Television / Broadcast Production	Eddie Trigueros for "Feed the Birds"	Won
2019	Annie Awards	Outstanding Achievement, Music in an Animated TV/Broadcast Production	Christopher Willis for "Springtime"	Won
2019	Annie Awards	Outstanding Achievement for Production Design in an Animated Television / Broadcast Production	Justin Martin for "Amore Motore"	Nominated
2019	Annie Awards	Outstanding Achievement for Storyboarding in an Animated Television / Broadcast Production	Alonso Ramirez-Ramos for "Carnaval"	Won
2019	Daytime Emmy Awards	Outstanding Children's Animated Series	Paul Rudish and Todd Popp	Nominated
2019	Daytime Emmy Awards	Outstanding Performer in an Animated Program	Chris Diamantopoulos as Mickey Mouse	Nominated
2019	Daytime Emmy Awards	Outstanding Music Direction and Composition	Christopher Willis	Nominated
2020	Annie Awards	Best Animated Television/Broadcast Production for Children	For "Carried Away"	Won
2020	Annie Awards	Outstanding Achievement for Directing in an Animated Television / Broadcast Production	Alonso Ramirez-Ramos for "For Whom the Bell Tolls"	Won
2020	Daytime Emmy Awards	Outstanding Directing for an Animated Program	Eddie Trigueros	Won
2020	Daytime Emmy Awards	Outstanding Editing for an Animated Program	Tony Molina, Mark Bollinger (assistant editor)	Won

== Theme park attractions ==
A Mickey Mouse-themed attractions, Mickey & Minnie's Runaway Railway and Vacation Fun – An Original Animated Short with Mickey & Minnie, replaced The Great Movie Ride and Star Wars: Path of the Jedi at Disney's Hollywood Studios at Walt Disney World Resort in Orlando, Florida. This attraction was also located at the Mickey's Toontown section of Disneyland at the Disneyland Resort, which opened on January 27, 2023 in Anaheim, California. The attraction is the third Mickey Mouse-themed attraction at any Disney property worldwide, only behind Mickey's PhilharMagic, (Note: The term "attraction" refers to amusement rides, whereas character meet-and-greets do not apply.) directly based on the series and involves guests watching the premiere of a new Mickey Mouse cartoon and then entering the cartoon itself. The show's creative team, including Paul Rudish, Joseph Holt and composer Christopher Willis, collaborated with Walt Disney Imagineering to create the attractions, which opened on March 4, 2020, at Disney's Hollywood Studios.

== Music ==
On July 21, 2023, Walt Disney Records released a soundtrack album of several songs from the series.

=== Soundtrack ===
Mickey Mouse (Music from the Disney Mickey Mouse Shorts)

Soundtrack album by Christopher Willis
- Released: July 23, 2023
- Length: 16:55
- Label: Walt Disney Records
- Producer: Christopher Willis

No.	Title	Writer(s)	Performer(s)	Length
1.	"Our Homespun Melody"	Christopher Willis, Elyse Willis	Mickey Mouse	2:47
2.	"Yodelberg"	Bob Jackman, Buddy Baker, Christopher Willis	Kerry Christensen, Emelie Laudie	1:26
3.	"Pua Nani Ē"	Christopher Willis, Johnson Enos, Sharyn Gabriel	Mickey Mouse, Minnie Mouse, Raiatea Helm	1:40
4.	"Happy Birthday, Mickey Mouse"	Christopher Willis, Paul Rudish	Minnie Mouse	0:33
5.	"Top of the World"	Christopher Willis	Mickey Mouse	1:13
6.	"Carried Away"	Christopher Willis, Elyse Willis	Minnie Mouse	2:17
7.	"Mumbai Madness"	Charanjeet Virdi, Christopher Willis, Ravindran Achariya	Charanjeet 'CJ' Virdi, Farah Kidwai	3:08
8.	"Springtime Symphony"	Christopher Willis	Christopher Willis	3:47
Total length:				16:55
