= Mumbai Madness =

- Mickey Mouse episode
- Episode no.: Season 2 Episode 8
- Directed by: Paul Rudish
- Written by: Darrick Bachman; Alonso Ramirez Ramos; Paul Rudish
- Editing by: Illya Owens
- Production code: 028
- Original air date: September 26, 2014
- Running time: 4 minutes

Episode chronology
← Previous "Captain Donald"	Next → "The Boiler Room"

"Mumbai Madness" is the eighth episode of the second season of the American animated television series Mickey Mouse, and its 26th episode overall. Co-written and directed by series creator Paul Rudish, the episode first aired on the Disney Channel in the United States on September 26, 2014, and was subsequently released on YouTube the next day. In the episode, Mickey Mouse is an auto rickshaw taxi driver in Mumbai, India tasked with transporting an elephant with a broken tusk to a distant mountain, encountering various obstacles along the way.

As the episode's score involved the use of authentically Indian instruments and approach to composition, composer Christopher Willis has deemed it to be his hardest assignment for the Mickey Mouse series.

== Plot ==
An elephant with a broken tusk arrives in Mumbai by train while holding a lotus. Looking around for further transportation, he spots Mickey Mouse with his auto rickshaw taxi. The elephant indicates that he would like to travel to a particular mountain, with Mickey agreeing to take him there, albeit insisting that a map isn't needed. As Mickey drives the elephant through Mumbai, various cows keep blocking their way, reaching a point where a clear path to the mountain is obstructed by a large herd of cows. Mickey solves the problem through a Bollywood-style musical number, though he unwittingly ends up taking the opposite direction from their destination.

After 17 hours of driving, Mickey relents and asks the elephant for his map, upon which the two proceed to travel through a variety of challenging terrains, ending up in a town next to a river. Nearing the point of giving up, Mickey notices that the river's reflection shows the mountain to be nearby. Taking a pot of spicy curry as fuel for his auto rickshaw, Mickey and the elephant blast through town and are able to arrive at the mountain, though Mickey's taxi is destroyed as a consequence. The elephant gives Mickey his lotus in return for the transportation, then mysteriously disappears in front of him, with Mickey noticing that he is at a temple filled with many elephant statues. As he ponders, the lotus lands in a pool and opens up to reveal a new auto rickshaw with wings, which Mickey cheerfully rides out of the mountain.

== Production ==
=== Music ===
Christopher Willis, the series composer for Mickey Mouse was told by the production staff about their plan to set an episode in India before production began to allow him time to prepare for composition. Willis, who was previously a musicologist, extensively researched Bollywood-related music and its traditions, and inquired with another musician who had knowledge of Indian music to better understand obscure methods of how they are composed and played. Charenjeet, an Indian singer-songwriter, was brought in to help write music for "Mumbai Madness" as well as provide vocals for the songs. Instruments used for "Mumbai Madness" include a sitar, a bansuri, and a shehnai. Willis considers the episode to be his "most labor-intensive" out of all the Mickey Mouse episodes.

The episode's entire score has since been released on SoundCloud by Willis on November 21, 2019.

== Release ==
"Mumbai Madness" originally aired on the Disney Channel in the United States on September 26, 2014. The following day, the episode was released on YouTube by the official Mickey Mouse YouTube account. As of June 2023, the episode has garnered almost 50 million views on the streaming platform.

== Accolades ==
Christopher Willis won the Annie Award for Outstanding Achievement, Music in an Animated TV/Broadcast Production for "Mumbai Madness". The episode was also nominated for the Primetime Emmy Award for Outstanding Short Form Animated Program.
