= The Wonderful World of Mickey Mouse =

American animated television series

- Disney+ release poster
- Genre: Comedy; Cartoon series Slapstick
- Created by: Paul Rudish
- Based on: Mickey Mouse by Paul Rudish; Mickey Mouse by Walt Disney Ub Iwerks
- Developed by: Paul Rudish
- Voices of: Chris Diamantopoulos; Kaitlyn Robrock; Tony Anselmo; Bill Farmer; Tress MacNeille
- Composer: Christopher Willis
- Country of origin: United States
- Original language: English
- No. of seasons: 2
- No. of episodes: 25

Production
- Executive producer: Paul Rudish
- Running time: 7 minutes (season 1); 22 minutes (season 2); 9 minutes (Steamboat Silly)
- Production company: Disney Television Animation

Original release
- Network: Disney+
- Release: November 18, 2020 – July 28, 2023

Related
- Mickey Mouse (2013–2019)

The Wonderful World of Mickey Mouse is an American animated television series produced by Disney Television Animation for Disney+. The series is a continuation and sequel to the Emmy Award-winning 2013 Mickey Mouse shorts, uses the same style, and has many of the same cast and crew, with the exception of the late Russi Taylor, who was replaced by Kaitlyn Robrock in the role of Minnie Mouse. The series premiered on November 18, 2020 to coincide with Mickey's 92nd birthday. The animation is provided by Mercury Filmworks.

From November 18 to December 18, 2020, Disney+ premiered two shorts a week. An additional ten shorts premiered from July 28 up until August 25, 2021.

The series was renewed in November 2021 for a second season consisting of four 22-minute specials centered around the seasons: the first of which, The Wonderful Winter of Mickey Mouse, premiered on February 18, 2022. The second special, The Wonderful Spring of Mickey Mouse, was released on March 25, 2022. The third special, The Wonderful Summer of Mickey Mouse, was released on July 8, 2022. The fourth and final special of the season, The Wonderful Autumn of Mickey Mouse, was released on November 18, 2022.

On July 28, 2023, a short titled Steamboat Silly was released. It served as the series finale.

The Wonderful World of Mickey Mouse received generally positive reviews from critics.

== Cast ==
=== Main voices ===
- Chris Diamantopoulos as Mickey Mouse
- Kaitlyn Robrock as Minnie Mouse
- Tony Anselmo as Donald Duck
- Bill Farmer as Goofy, Pluto, Horace Horsecollar and Lumière
- Tress MacNeille as Daisy Duck and the Wicked Witch

=== Additional voices ===
- Jim Cummings as Pete and Tigger
- Corey Burton as Ludwig Von Drake
- April Winchell as Clarabelle Cow
- John Kassir as Scrooge McDuck
- Paul Rudish as Walrus Mayor and additional voices
- Fred Tatasciore as Humphrey the Bear, Yeti and additional voices
- Jeff Bennett as Mortimer Mouse and Ranger J. Audubon Woodlore

=== Guest stars ===
- Alan Tudyk as the House of Tomorrow
- Pat Carroll as Ursula
- Clancy Brown as The Big Bad Wolf
- Joanna Lumley as the Narrator (The Brave Little Squire)
- Jeffrey Ross as Lonesome Ghost
- Jason Mantzoukas as Huckster McBackstabber
- Grey DeLisle as The Fairy Godmother
- Joe Ochman as Jiminy Cricket
- Antonia Thomas as the Narrator (The Wonderful Winter of Mickey Mouse)
- Craig Robinson as Snowflake Boss
- Keith David as the Narrator (The Wonderful Spring of Mickey Mouse)

== Cameos by other Disney characters and properties ==
- Humphrey the Bear
- Weasels and J. Thaddeus Toad from The Wind in the Willows
- Ichabod Crane and Tilda from The Legend of Sleepy Hollow
- Thumper and Friend Owl from Bambi
  - Bambi himself also appears on the cover of a book.
- Steamboat Willie Riverboat (pictured)
- Skeleton from The Skeleton Dance
- Butch the Bulldog
- Merlin and Madame Mim from The Sword in the Stone
- Yen Sid from The Sorcerer's Apprentice
- Madame Upanova from Dance of the Hours
- Ursula and Flounder from The Little Mermaid
- The Beagle Boys
- Oswald the Lucky Rabbit (hole)
- The Beast, Mrs. Potts, Chip and Lumière from Beauty and the Beast
- Dippy Dawg
- Dumbo and Timothy Q. Mouse from Dumbo
- Rhino Guards, Friar Tuck, Lady Kluck, Otto, Mother Rabbit, Skippy, Sir Hiss and Trigger from Robin Hood
- Snow White, the Evil Queen (in her hag form), the Magic Mirror, Dopey and the forest animals from Snow White and the Seven Dwarfs
- Aracuan Bird from The Three Caballeros
- Flit from Pocahontas
- Cinderella from the film of the same name
- Alice and The Cheshire Cat from Alice in Wonderland
- Buff, Max and Melvin from Country Bear Jamboree
- Jenny and Joe from Once Upon a Wintertime
- Tigger from the Winnie the Pooh franchise
- The Chimney Sweeps and Mary Poppins's umbrella from Mary Poppins
- Susie the Little Blue Coupe from the titular cartoon

== Music ==
Like in the previous series, the music was composed by Christopher Willis. Walt Disney Records released two soundtrack songs on a short album called "The Wonderful World of Mickey Mouse", co-written by Willis: "Donald's Conga Song" from "Supermarket Scramble" and "The Wrangler's Code" from "Cheese Wranglers" in November 2020.

Four more soundtrack songs were released under the title "Music from The Wonderful World of Mickey Mouse", including "As Long As I Have You," "Island Rhythm," "Bubble Gum Days," and "Feelin' the Love."

On July 27, 2023, Walt Disney Records released "The Wonderful World of Mickey Mouse: Season 2 (Original Soundtrack)", with 6 songs being "Mickey Mouse Club March," "Summer Vacation," "Sweet Summer Jams, "The Fall Song," "A Shooting Star," and "Hilltop Hootenanny."

== Episodes ==
Season	Episodes	Originally released	
Season	Episodes	First released	Last released
1	20	November 18, 2020	August 25, 2021
2	5	February 18, 2022	July 28, 2023

=== Season 1 (2020–21) ===
No. overall	No. in season	Title	Directed by	Written by	Storyboarded by	Original release date	Prod. code
1	1	"Cheese Wranglers"	Eddie Trigueros	Darrick Bachman, Leanna Dindal, Kristen Morrison, Paul Rudish & Eddie Trigueros	Kristen Morrison & Eddie Trigueros	November 18, 2020	101
Minnie Mouse, the proprietor of Big Thunder Valley, hires Mickey Mouse, the best cheese wrangler in the west, to ride every cheese wheel to town, with her ranch hands, Donald Duck and Goofy assisting him. But they need to keep the cheese safe from infamous cheese rustler, Peg-Leg Pete.: Note: Humphrey the Bear makes a brief cameo. In addition, the Mark Twain Riverboat, the Haunted Mansion, and Chickapin Hill appear in the beginning establishing shot.; Song: "The Wrangler's Code"
2	2	"House of Tomorrow"	Jason Reicher	Darrick Bachman, Tara Billinger, Leanna Dindal, Jason Reicher & Paul Rudish	Tara Billinger & Jason Reicher	November 18, 2020	102
At the Hall of Science, Mickey, Donald, and Goofy sneak into Professor Ludwig von Drake's House of Tomorrow, a futuristic house with an artificial intelligence tending to their every need, which turns out to not be the dream they were envisioning.: Note: This episode is a tribute to an original Tomorrowland attraction at Disneyland, the Monsanto House of the Future.; Guest star: Alan Tudyk as the House of Tomorrow
3	3	"Hard to Swallow"	Eddie Trigueros	Darrick Bachman, Leanna Dindal, Kristen Morrison, Paul Rudish & Eddie Trigueros	Kristen Morrison & Eddie Trigueros	November 27, 2020	103
Mickey tries to get Pluto to eat his flea pill, which Pluto finds disgusting. The situation becomes dire when an army of fleas target Pluto.: Note: If one listens closely, they can hear Pluto's theme music from his cartoons when it aired in the 1940s when Pluto came to Mickey.
4	4	"School of Fish"	Jason Reicher	Darrick Bachman, Tara Billinger, Leanna Dindal, Jason Reicher & Paul Rudish	Tara Billinger & Jason Reicher	November 27, 2020	104
Mickey sends his goldfish, Gubbles, to school, but becomes so concerned for his well-being that he begins following him around everywhere at school.
5	5	"Keep on Rollin'"	Eddie Trigueros	Darrick Bachman, Leanna Dindal, Kristen Morrison, Paul Rudish & Eddie Trigueros	Kristen Morrison & Eddie Trigueros	December 4, 2020	105
Mickey and his friends' disco night at the roller rink is crashed by Peg-Leg Pete and his roller derby team.: Note: Ursula from The Little Mermaid and The Beagle Boys appear as the members of Pete's team. Yen Sid from Fantasia and The Beast from Beauty and the Beast make cameo appearances.; Note 2: This would be the last time Pat Carroll voiced Ursula in animation.; Guest star: Pat Carroll as Ursula
6	6	"The Big Good Wolf"	Jason Reicher	Darrick Bachman, Tara Billinger, Leanna Dindal, Jason Reicher & Paul Rudish	Tara Billinger & Jason Reicher	December 4, 2020	106
Mickey tries to reform the Big Bad Wolf, only to find out it's not very easy.: Note: Dumbo and Timothy Q. Mouse from Dumbo and The Saxophone Prince from Music Land make cameo appearances.; Guest star: Clancy Brown as The Big Bad Wolf
7	7	"The Brave Little Squire"	Mike Bell	Darrick Bachman, Mike Bell, Leanna Dindal, Brianne Drouhard, Ricky Roxburgh, & Paul Rudish	Mike Bell & Brianne Drouhard	December 11, 2020	107
Mickey dreams of being a knight like his idol, Sir Mortimer, but discovers his new boss' heroic reputation is a fairytale.: Note: Several characters from Robin Hood, Maleficent's Goons from Sleeping Beauty, and Madame Mim from The Sword in the Stone make cameo appearances.; Guest stars: Jeff Bennett as Mortimer Mouse and Joanna Lumley as the Narrator
8	8	"An Ordinary Date"	Eddie Trigueros	Darrick Bachman, Leanna Dindal, Kristen Morrison, Paul Rudish & Eddie Trigueros	Kristen Morrison & Eddie Trigueros	December 11, 2020	108
Mickey and Minnie try to make their date an original and excitable one. However, their romantic gestures to one another each go awry as both Mickey and Minnie are secretly planning their surprises at the same time.
9	9	"Supermarket Scramble"	Mike Bell	Darrick Bachman, Leanna Dindal, Brianne Drouhard, Paul Rudish & Eddie Trigueros	Mike Bell, Brianne Drouhard & Eddie Trigueros	December 18, 2020	109
Mickey and friends decide to have a barbecue but variously get held up at the local supermarket when it turns into an odyssey.: Song: "Donald's Conga Song"
10	10	"Just the Four of Us"	Mike Bell	Darrick Bachman, Mike Bell, Leanna Dindal, Brianne Drouhard, Paul Rudish	Sabrina Alberghetti, Mike Bell, Brianne Drouhard	December 18, 2020	110
Donald and Daisy try to avoid having a double date with Mickey and Minnie. Donald lies to them saying he and Daisy are sick, and when Mickey and Minnie come over to look after them, Donald and Daisy must avoid them to finally get alone time together.
11	11	"Houseghosts"	Ryan Gillis	Darrick Bachman, Leanna Dindal, Ryan Gillis, & Paul Rudish	Ryan Gillis	July 28, 2021	111
When several ghosts are left without a home to haunt, Mickey invites them to stay.: Note: The Skeletons from The Skeleton Dance make a cameo.; Guest star: Jeffrey Ross as Lead Ghost; Song: "Bubble Gum Days"
12	12	"The Enchanting Hut"	Jason Reicher	Darrick Bachman, Tara Billinger, Leanna Dindal, Jason Reicher, & Paul Rudish	Tara Billinger & Jason Reicher	July 28, 2021	112
Mickey and Minnie struggle to build a shelter after a storm threatens to destroy their island.: Song: "Island Rhythm"
13	13	"Duet for Two"	Eddie Trigueros	Darrick Bachman, Leanna Dindal, Kristen Morrison, Paul Rudish, & Eddie Trigueros	Kristen Morrison & Eddie Trigueros	August 4, 2021	113
Mickey and Minnie seek to make everyone happy by playing an adorable duet.: Song: "As Long As I'm With You"; Guest star: Jason Mantzoukas as Huckster McBackstabber
14	14	"Birdwatching"	Mike Bell	Darrick Bachman, Mike Bell, Leanna Dindal, Brianne Drouhard, & Paul Rudish	Mike Bell & Brianne Drouhard	August 4, 2021	114
When Minnie's quest to photograph an elusive bird places Mickey in danger, she must save him.
15	15	"Bellboys"	Jason Reicher	Darrick Bachman, Tara Billinger, Leanna Dindal, Jason Reicher, & Paul Rudish	Tara Billinger & Jason Reicher	August 11, 2021	115
Bellboys Mickey, Donald, and Goofy seek to revive a rundown hotel's future.
16	16	"I Heart Mickey"	Ryan Gillis	Darrick Bachman, Leanna Dindal, Ryan Gillis, Ricky Roxburgh, & Paul Rudish	Ryan Gillis	August 11, 2021	116
When Minnie misplaces Mickey's ultimate gift of love, she must defeat a lover's lane of infatuated objects to retrieve it.
17	17	"Untold Treasures"	Eddie Trigueros	Darrick Bachman, Leanna Dindal, Kristen Morrison, Paul Rudish, & Eddie Trigueros	Kristen Morrison & Eddie Trigueros	August 18, 2021	117
Crewmates Mickey and Minnie seek to find a buried treasure before Peg-Leg Pete uses it to become the most powerful pirate on the seven seas.: Note: This episode features an appearance by the Pirate Skull from Pirates of the Caribbean.
18	18	"Disappearing Act"	Mike Bell	Darrick Bachman, Mike Bell, Leanna Dindal, Brianne Drouhard, & Paul Rudish	Mike Bell & Brianne Drouhard	August 18, 2021	118
Mickey scrambles to rescue Minnie after accidentally making her disappear with a magic wand.: Note: At one point, Minnie is transformed into a rabbit similar to Fanny from the Oswald the Lucky Rabbit series. The Fairy Godmother from Cinderella, Jiminy Cricket and The Blue Fairy from Pinocchio, Flora, Fauna, and Merryweather from Sleeping Beauty, and Merlin from The Sword in the Stone make cameo appearances.; Guest star: Joe Ochman as Jiminy Cricket
19	19	"Once Upon an Apple"	Eddie Trigueros	Darrick Bachman, Leanna Dindal, Kristen Morrison, Paul Rudish, & Eddie Trigueros	Kristen Morrison & Eddie Trigueros	August 25, 2021	119
Mickey's quest to make everyone smile hits a snag when he meets a Wicked Witch bent on delivering poison apples to the fairest one in the land.: Note: Mr. Toad from The Wind in the Willows, the title character from Cinderella and The Cheshire Cat from Alice in Wonderland make cameo appearances.; Song: "Feelin' the Love"
20	20	"Game Night"	Jason Reicher	Darrick Bachman, Tara Billinger, Leanna Dindal, Kristen Morrison, Jason Reicher, & Paul Rudish	Tara Billinger, Kristen Morrison, & Jason Reicher	August 25, 2021	120
Mickey's friends are placed in jeopardy after he attempts to spice up their weekly game night by turning his backyard into a life-size game board.

=== Season 2 (Specials) (2022–23) ===
No. overall	No. in season	Title	Directed by	Written by	Storyboarded by	Original release date	Prod. code
21	1	"The Wonderful Winter of Mickey Mouse"	Ryan Gillis, William Reiss & Eddie Trigueros	Darrick Bachman, Stevie Borbolla, Ryan Gillis, Kristen Morrison, William Reiss, Ricky Roxburgh, Paul Rudish & Eddie Trigueros	Stevie Borbolla, Ryan Gillis, Kristen Morrison, William Reiss & Eddie Trigueros	February 18, 2022	201
In the first story, janitor Mickey, who has had the yearning to create a snowflake on a magical snowflake-making factory up in the cloud, ends up forming a giant snowflake after using too much snowflake juice during closing time. Mickey ends up losing the snowflake and having to sacrifice his oversized creation before it smashes the city below the clouds. In the second story, Goofy develops claustrophobia after getting snowed in inside a tiny cabin at a ski resort with Mickey and Donald before they all could join in any of the resort's activities, and must find a way out before they all freeze to death. Later, the trio end up getting chased by an avalanche that was made of the blanket of snow they were trapped beneath. In the third story, Mickey and Minnie are ice skating a magical performance, and must entertain their fans without getting knocked over by other occupied spots on the ice, including a fishing Goofy.: Note: Buff, Max and Melvin from Country Bear Jamboree, Jenny and Joe from Once Upon a Wintertime, and Thumper and Friend Owl from Bambi make brief cameo appearances.; Guest stars: Antonia Thomas as the Narrator and Craig Robinson as Snowflake Boss; Song: "A Shooting Star"
22	2	"The Wonderful Spring of Mickey Mouse"	Karl Hadrika, William Reiss & Eddie Trigueros	Darrick Bachman, Stevie Borbolla, Karl Hadrika, Nick Lauer, Kristen Morrison, William Reiss, Ricky Roxburgh, Paul Rudish & Eddie Trigueros	Stevie Borbolla, Karl Hadrika, Nick Lauer, Kristen Morrison, William Reiss & Eddie Trigueros	March 25, 2022	202
In the first story, three flowers, a vine of grapes, and a caterpillar (Mickey, Minnie, Daisy, Donald and Goofy respectively), try to leave their dry and their rotty windmill home to get beamed by the friendly face of the sun (Dopey the Dwarf). In the second story, Mickey and Minnie try to clean up their yard and make it blossom but end up overdoing it when the plants affected by their love pollinate, attacking their friends and messing up their homes. In the third story, Minnie tries to help Mickey with spring cleaning but he can't bear to throw anything away because each item is filled with precious memories.: Note: Alice and the two talking flowers: daffodils and pansies from Alice in Wonderland, Bucky Bug, Tigger from the Winnie the Pooh franchise, the chimney sweeps from Mary Poppins, and Lumière, Mrs. Potts, and Chip from Beauty and the Beast, the Keyblade from the Kingdom Hearts series, the Magic Mirror from Snow White and the Seven Dwarfs, Jafar's staff from Aladdin, Mary Poppins' purse and umbrella from Mary Poppins, the Swiss hat from the original series' episode "Yodelberg", the tailor scissors from Brave Little Tailor, the British crown from The Prince and the Pauper, the model of droid R2-D2 and the doll of Grogu from Star Wars, and the disc of the Splashdance CD make cameo appearances.; Guest stars: Keith David as the Narrator and Jim Cummings as Tigger; Song: "Hilltop Hootenanny"
23	3	"The Wonderful Summer of Mickey Mouse"	Karl Hadrika, Kristen Morrison, Jason Reicher & Eddie Trigueros	Darrick Bachman, Stevie Borbolla, Karl Hadrika, Nick Lauer, Kristen Morrison, Jason Reicher, William Reiss, Ricky Roxburgh, Paul Rudish & Eddie Trigueros	Stevie Borbolla, Karl Hadrika, Nick Lauer, Kristen Morrison, Jason Reicher & Eddie Trigueros	July 8, 2022	203
When Mickey, Minnie, Daisy, Donald, and Goofy accidentally destroy the Summer Fireworks Spectacular, they tell the shocked Mayor about the incidents who caused it due to the fact that they don't want to miss out on it like the last few years, and then try to make up for it by repairing it.: Songs: "Summer Vacation", "Sweet Summer Jams, and "Summer Spectacular"; Note: Susie from Susie the Little Blue Coupe, Elmer Elephant, and Tillie Tiger from the titular cartoon make cameo appearances.
24	4	"The Wonderful Autumn of Mickey Mouse"	Karl Hadrika, William Reiss & Eddie Trigueros	Darrick Bachman, Stevie Borbolla, Karl Hadrika, Nick Lauer, Kristen Morrison, Jason Reicher, William Reiss, Ricky Roxburgh, Paul Rudish & Eddie Trigueros	Stevie Borbolla, Karl Hadrika, Nick Lauer, Kristen Morrison, Jason Reicher, William Reiss & Eddie Trigueros	November 18, 2022	204
Mickey Mouse is determined to undo the failures of his family's past after inheriting a rundown pumpkin farm from a distant relative and the epic legend of its futility.: Note: Ichabod Crane and Tilda from The Legend of Sleepy Hollow make a cameo appearance.; Song: "The Fall Song"
25	5	"Steamboat Silly"	Eddie Trigueros	Darrick Bachman, Kristen Morrison, Paul Rudish & Eddie Trigueros	Kristen Morrison & Eddie Trigueros	July 28, 2023	301
Mickey Mouse and his friends must stop hundreds of old film reel versions of Mickey from wreaking havoc all over town.: Song: Mickey Mouse Club March

== Reception ==
=== Critical response ===
Patrick Cavanaugh of ComicBook.com gave the series a positive review, describing it as "nothing but fun and excitement [...] filled with laugh-out-loud comedy, modern settings, timeless stories, new music, and the unmistakable classic art style of the Mickey Mouse shorts." Ethan Anderton of Firstpost called both the creation of Mickey Mouse and The Wonderful World of Mickey Mouse the "best thing Disney has done with the trademark character outside of the theme parks in a long time," praised the animation for its style that recalls old animated shorts, and complimented the humor of the two shows, writing, "Not only is the animation outstanding, but it's pretty funny too." FP Staff of Firstpost reviewed the series positively, saying it holds "nostalgic value as old characters revisit," called the animation "whimsical," and found the show entertaining.

Emily Ashby of Common Sense Media rated the show three out of five stars, found agreeable the depiction of positive role models, citing the friendship between characters, and praised the humor of the series, writing, "This show focuses on presenting stories that are fun and funny. [...] Some episodes involve mild stereotypes based on the characters' roles and the story's setting, but they're always meant to be funny." Marisa Lascala of Good Housekeeping included The Wonderful World of Mickey Mouse in their "60 Best Kids' TV Shows and Family Series of All Time" list, asserting, "Not only is the drawing style on these Mickey Mouse episodes more playful than in traditional Disney shorts, the characters have a much more mischievous energy, too."

=== Accolades ===
Year	Award	Category	Recipient(s)	Result	Ref.
2021	Annie Awards	Outstanding Achievement for Directing in an Animated Television/Media Production	Eddie Trigueros for "Hard to Swallow"	Nominated	
2021	Daytime Emmy Awards	Outstanding Editing for an Animated Program	Tony Molina	Nominated	
2021	Daytime Emmy Awards	Outstanding Directing for a Daytime Animated Program	The Wonderful World of Mickey Mouse	Nominated	
2022	Children's and Family Emmy Awards	Outstanding Music Direction and Composition for an Animated Program	Christopher Willis	Nominated	
2023	Children's and Family Emmy Awards	Outstanding Animated Special	The Wonderful Summer of Mickey Mouse	Nominated	
2023	Children's and Family Emmy Awards	Outstanding Editing for an Animated Program	Emily Rifkin	Nominated	
2025	Children's and Family Emmy Awards	Outstanding Animated Short Form Program	"Steamboat Silly"	Nominated	
2025	Children's and Family Emmy Awards	Outstanding Editing for an Animated Program	Dao Le for "Steamboat Silly"	Nominated	
