= The Walt Disney World Explorer =

1990s application detailing Walt Disney World

- Box art of the 1998 released Second Edition, with Windows CD-ROM label
- Developer(s): Disney Interactive; Mindsai Productions
- Publisher(s): Disney Interactive
- Platform(s): Microsoft Windows; Apple Macintosh
- Release: Original version: US: September 24, 1996; Second Edition: US: April 23, 1998

The Walt Disney World Explorer is a point and click Windows and Macintosh application developed by Mindsai Productions and Disney Interactive, and published by the latter. The application focuses on the Walt Disney World Resort near Orlando, Florida. It consists of narrated virtual tours, trivia, and slideshows of the resort's parks, attractions, hotels, and other related topics. Various minigames are also built into the application, such as a quiz that allows users to test their knowledge of the resort, and a game that involves finding Hidden Mickeys.

Two editions of this program were released; the first edition was released on September 24, 1996, in time for the resort's 25th anniversary a week later. An updated release, The Walt Disney World Explorer – Second Edition, was released on April 23, 1998, with updated information on new attractions such as Buzz Lightyear's Space Ranger Spin, new resorts such as Disney's Coronado Springs Resort, and Disney's Animal Kingdom, which first opened the day before the Second Edition's release.

== Overview ==
The application is mainly a slideshow viewer that features photographs and images related to the Walt Disney World Resort, accompanied by narration by Hettie Lynne Hurtes and Corey Burton.

Upon launching the application and going through or skipping the opening cutscene, the user is brought to a large, stylized map of the resort filled with clickable hotspots that are visually represented by colorful depictions of what their topics are about. The user has Tinker Bell from Peter Pan (1953) as their pointer. If Tinker Bell is on a clickable hotspot or element, her wand will sparkle with pixie dust. Additionally, on the map, a tooltip appearing as a scroll will appear over the hotspot for (as indicated by a yellow scroll) topics or (as indicated by a blue scroll on the main resort map only) to dive into a separate map focused on a themed land, two themed lands, or an entire theme park. (Note: Specifically, Main Street, U.S.A., Adventureland, Frontierland and Liberty Square together, Fantasyland and Mickey's Toontown Fair together (today all Fantasyland, with the former Toontown Fair now being the Storybook Circus sub-area of Fantasyland), or Tomorrowland in Magic Kingdom; Future World (today World Celebration, World Discovery, and World Nature) or World Showcase in Epcot; or all of Disney Studios Florida (the application's name for what was then actually named Disney-MGM Studios and today named Disney's Hollywood Studios).) The user also has access to the "Walt Disney World Compass", a compass in the shape of Mickey Mouse's head on the bottom-left corner of the screen that allows users to ask for help, exit the program, go one step back (up to the resort map), or search for a specific area of interest within the application.

All topics have a slideshow with narrated descriptions of the topic in question. Many topics, usually attractions, have additional "Backstage" and "Trivia" options; "Backstage" features an additional slideshow or video giving a "behind-the-scenes" look at the topic, while "Trivia" features another slideshow with additional trivia about the topic. A few topics also feature either a "More Stuff" option, featuring another slideshow or video relevant to the topic, or an option to view a rectilinear 360° panoramic photograph relating to the topic, also companied by narration. Furthermore, the application features a number of clickable Hidden Mickeys icons hidden in the last photographs of several topics' main slideshow for the user to find, tracked by a counter on the bottom-right of a topic's screen (as well as by a found Hidden Mickey being highlighted); finding ten Hidden Mickeys will play a brief video clip featuring Walt Disney and the song "Congratulations, Mr. Mickey Mouse" before automatically resetting the counter and "re-hiding" the Hidden Mickeys.

There are also a number of "interactivities" found throughout the program:

- The Walt Disney World Quiz Challenge: A quiz game in which one or two players play a fictional game show hosted by Charles Fleischer and answer multiple-choice questions based on the Trivia slideshows in the application.
- The Walt Disney World Timeline: An interactive timeline covering the growth of the resort through the years from its opening in 1971 up to the release years of the application.
- Tours of the World: Guided tours of various topics encompassing different themes with separate narration provided by actress Leslie Ryan, who appears in full-motion video within this interactivity's menu screen.
- Oceans of the World: An interactive aquarium found within The Living Seas covering the effects of overfishing and pollution on the marine ecosystem.
- Monster Sound: An interactive miniature Foley studio found within The Monster Sound Show (original version) or the ABC Sound Studio (Second Edition) where users can record sound effects to short clips of classic Disney films and play them back.

== Reception ==
In a brief November 1996 review of the application, Steve Daly of Entertainment Weekly gave the application a grade of C, saying at the time that the overworld map was slow to redraw, and it was too easy to click on the wrong option when using the Mickey Mouse head-shaped compass.
