= Christopher Willis =

British composer (born 1978)

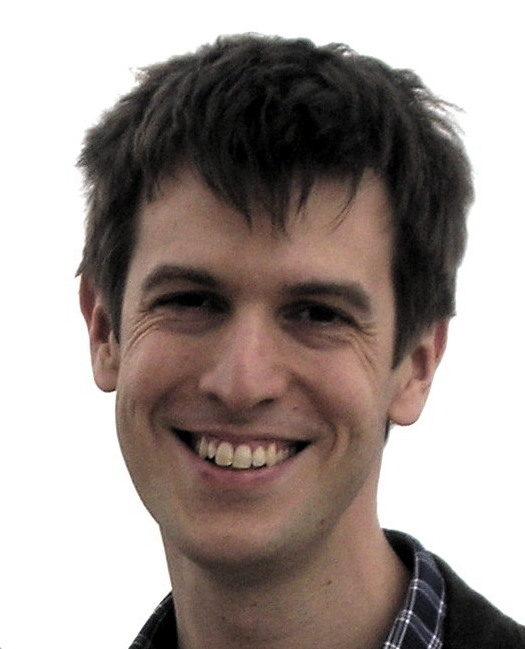
- Christopher Willis in France in 2013
- Born: 21 August 1978 (age 48); Newcastle, Australia
- Education: University of Cambridge
- Occupations: Composer, musicologist
- Years active: 2006–present
- Spouse: Elyse Marchant Willis (m. 2012)

Christopher Willis (born 21 August 1978) is an Australian-born British composer and musicologist.

== Career ==
He is the composer of the 2013 Disney television series Mickey Mouse, and co-composer (with Rupert Gregson-Williams) of the music to the HBO comedy series Veep. He has also written music for a number of film scores (credited with "additional music") with several other film composers including Carter Burwell, Harry Gregson-Williams, and Henry Jackman. His filmography includes The Twilight Saga: Breaking Dawn – Part 2 (2012), Winnie the Pooh (2011), X-Men: First Class (2011), Shrek Forever After (2010), Grown Ups (2010), You Don't Mess With The Zohan (2008) and the television series Veep. His score for The Death of Stalin (2017) was shortlisted along with 14 others for the Academy Award for Best Original Score.

His concert music includes a piece written specially for The BBC Proms in 2010 entitled Mashup. The music is a written-out mashup of other pieces from the programme of the concert at which it was premiered. He has also composed music for educational purposes including Boom Town for chamber orchestra and young children, which was part of the 2012 Summer Olympics in London.

He is also a musicologist specializing in eighteenth-century music, especially Domenico Scarlatti, although he has written about other subjects including American minimalism. He holds a Ph.D. from the University of Cambridge and has written a number of scholarly articles, including a chapter to the book Domenico Scarlatti Adventures: Essays to Commemorate the 250th Anniversary of His Death, and articles in the journals Early Music and Eighteenth-Century Music.

== Filmography ==
=== Feature films ===
Year	Title	Director(s)	Notes
2017	The Death of Stalin	Armando Iannucci	—N/a
2019	The Personal History of David Copperfield	Armando Iannucci	—N/a
2023	Old Dads	Bill Burr	—N/a
2024	Goodrich	Hallie Meyers-Shyer	—N/a

=== Television ===
Year	Title	Network	Notes
2012–2017	Veep	HBO	Composed with Rupert Gregson-Williams
2013–2019	Mickey Mouse	Disney Channel	
2016–2019	The Lion Guard	Disney Junior	
2016–2022	Agatha Raisin	Sky One; Acorn TV	Composed with Rupert Gregson-Williams
2020–2023	The Wonderful World of Mickey Mouse	Disney+	
2021–2023	Schmigadoon!	Apple TV+	
2022	Cat Burglar	Netflix	Interactive special Children's and Family Emmy Awards for Outstanding Music Direction and Composition for an Animated Program
2024—present	Ariel	Disney Jr.	
2025	Prep & Landing: The Snowball Protocol	Disney Channel	Television special Themes by Michael Giacchino
2026	70 Up	ITV	Final part of the 7 Up series

=== Theme park attractions ===
Year	Title	Park	Notes
2020	Mickey & Minnie's Runaway Railway	Disney's Hollywood Studios/Disneyland	
2020	Vacation Fun - An Original Animated Short with Mickey & Minnie	Disney's Hollywood Studios	
2022	AquaMouse	Disney Wish	
2023	Mickey's Toontown	Disneyland	He composed "Our Homespun Melody" as well as his song "Nothing Can Stop Us Now" which was remixed and they are the land's background themes
