= List of Mickey Mouse episodes =

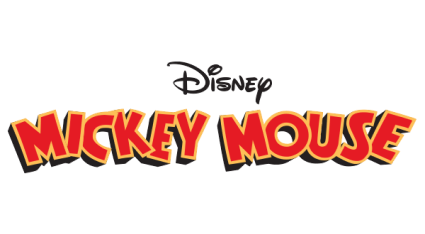

Mickey Mouse is an American animated television series produced by Disney Television Animation for Disney Channel. It had a special premiere on March 12, 2013 on disney.com, while it officially premiered on Disney Channel on June 28 of the same year.

During the course of the series, 94 episodes of Mickey Mouse aired over five seasons, between June 28, 2013, and July 20, 2019.

== Series overview ==
Season	Episodes	Originally released	
Season	Episodes	First released	Last released
1	18	June 28, 2013	March 7, 2014
2	19	April 11, 2014	June 9, 2015
3	20	July 17, 2015	July 29, 2016
Specials	2	December 9, 2016	October 8, 2017
4	19	June 9, 2017	July 14, 2018
5	18	October 6, 2018	July 20, 2019

== Episodes ==
=== Season 1 (2013–14) ===
No. overall	No. in season	Title	Directed by	Written by	Storyboard by	Original release date	Prod. code	US viewers (millions)
1	1	"No Service"	Paul Rudish	Paul Rudish	Paul Rudish	June 28, 2013	002	N/A
While waiting for Minnie and Daisy's arrival, Mickey and Donald decide to buy lunch only to be rejected by Goofy's "no shirt, no shoes, no service" policy. The two make a deal and Mickey gives his clothes to Donald who uses this deal for himself.
2	2	"Yodelberg"	Aaron Springer	Derek Dressler, Clay Morrow, Paul Rudish, & Aaron Springer	Aaron Springer	June 29, 2013	003	2.50
On an old alpine yodeling mountain, Mickey must be quiet to yodel with Minnie who lives on top of the mountain. However, he is caught in a loud avalanche and while climbing up he must avoid hundreds of cuckoo clocks, Matterhorn Bobsleds, abominable snowman, a pig belching contest and a bag of chips. Guest star: Aaron Springer
3	3	"Croissant de Triomphe"	Paul Rudish	Paul Rudish	Paul Rudish	June 30, 2013	001	2.00
Minnie's café runs out of croissants when they are in big demand by the customers resulting in Mickey having to speed through Paris on his scooter to deliver the croissants. Guest stars: Karen Strassman, Oscar Pauwels, Pascal Germain, Xavier Fagnon, and Paul Rudish Note: This episode was first released on March 12, 2013, on Disney.com, and features guest appearances by characters from Cinderella, as well as a shot of the iconic Cinderella Castle.
4	4	"New York Weenie"	Aaron Springer	Aaron Springer; Derek Dressler, Clay Morrow, & Paul Rudish (Additional Written Material)	Aaron Springer	July 5, 2013	004	2.40
Mickey chases a runaway hot dog throughout Central Park, New York. Guest stars: Betty White, Brian George, and Aaron Springer
5	5	"Tokyo Go"	Paul Rudish	Heiko Drengenberg, Derek Dressler, Clay Morrow, Paul Rudish, & Aaron Springer	Heiko Drengenberg	July 12, 2013	005	2.80
On his way to work at a children's train station in Tokyo, Japan, Mickey accidentally boards the wrong bullet train and must get to his regular bullet train. Guest star: Hira Ambrosino Note: At the end of this episode, there is a picture of Walt Disney aboard the Disneyland Railroad's Ernest S. Marsh.
6	6	"Stayin' Cool"	Dave Wasson	Derek Dressler, Clay Morrow, Paul Rudish, Aaron Springer, & Dave Wasson	Dave Wasson	July 19, 2013	006	3.51
Mickey, Donald and Goofy attempt to keep themselves cool on the hottest summer day of the year. Guest star: Dave Wasson
7	7	"Gasp!"	Clay Morrow	Clay Morrow; Derek Dressler, Paul Rudish, & Aaron Springer (Additional Written Material)	Clay Morrow	July 26, 2013	009	3.23
After Mickey chases away a sneaky cat, the fishbowl breaks when he slams his window shut. Mickey must save his pet fish, Gubbles, by using many different water-related appliances in his apartment. Guest star: Dee Bradley Baker
8	8	"Panda-monium"	Aaron Springer	Aaron Springer; Derek Dressler, Clay Morrow, & Paul Rudish (Additional Written Material)	Aaron Springer	August 2, 2013	010	3.20
Mickey attempts to photograph a bashful and shy panda bear at the Beijing Zoo from many different perspectives but eventually becomes mistaken as a panda and has his picture taken. Guest star: Alex Chu
9	9	"Bad Ear Day"	Chris Savino	Derek Dressler, Clay Morrow, Paul Rudish, Chris Savino, & Aaron Springer	Chris Savino	August 16, 2013	008	3.70
Mickey searches for his ears after losing them before a date with Minnie and must do so while navigating in a world with little to no sound. Guest stars: Don Cherry and Paul Rudish
10	10	"Ghoul Friend"	Aaron Springer	Aaron Springer; Derek Dressler, Clay Morrow, & Paul Rudish (Additional Written Material)	Aaron Springer	October 4, 2013	007	3.30
After Mickey's car breaks down in a spooky forest and graveyard, a Goofy-looking ghoul gives chase to everyone's favorite mouse and Mickey discovers the real reason the ghoul is chasing him: The ghoul was chasing Mickey because he wanted to help him fix his car.
11	11	"Dog Show"	Dave Wasson	Derek Dressler, Clay Morrow, Paul Rudish, Aaron Springer & Dave Wasson	Dave Wasson	October 11, 2013	012	2.92
After Pluto gets injured, Mickey substitutes Goofy for a dog show that he entered Pluto in only to discover Goofy is not cut out to be a show dog. Guest stars: Kari Wahlgren, Dave Wasson, and John Waters
12	12	"'O Sole Minnie"	Paul Rudish	Derek Dressler, Clay Morrow, Alonso Ramirez Ramos, Paul Rudish & Aaron Springer	Alonso Ramirez Ramos	October 18, 2013	013	2.88
Mickey is a gondolier in Venice trying to woo waitress Minnie. Guest stars: Paul Rudish and Roberta Sparta
13	13	"Potatoland"	Aaron Springer	Aaron Springer; Derek Dressler, Clay Morrow, & Paul Rudish (Additional Written Material)	Aaron Springer	November 18, 2013	016	N/A
Mickey and Donald take Goofy to Idaho to visit a potato-themed theme park called "Potatoland". However, when Mickey and Donald discover that Potatoland is just part of a sign that introduces people into Idaho, they attempt to make Goofy's dream come true by building a Disneyland-style theme park, complete with carousel, Haunted Mansion and Great Moments with Mr. Lincoln, made of gravy and potatoes. Note #1: This is the first episode that has an extended 7-minute running time. Note #2: This episode aired on Mickey Mouse’s 85th birthday.
14	14	"Sleepwalkin'"	Paul Rudish	Heiko Drengenberg, Derek Dressler, Clay Morrow, Paul Rudish, & Aaron Springer	Heiko Drengenberg	December 6, 2013	014	2.11
Mickey agrees to watch over Goofy after Goofy reveals he has sleepwalking problems, only to discover the problem was worse than Goofy had described.
15	15	"Flipperboobootosis"	Paul Rudish	Darrick Bachman, David Gemmill, Clay Morrow & Paul Rudish	David Gemmill	January 3, 2014	018	N/A
Mickey and Goofy try to find a cure for Donald's very serious foot ailment, Flipperboobootosis, after he refuses to go to the doctor but with disastrous results. Guest stars: Kevin Michael Richardson as Bear Doctor, Becki Newton as Cruise Ship Waitress
16	16	"Tapped Out"	Clay Morrow	Darrick Bachman, Clay Morrow, Paul Rudish, & Aaron Springer	Clay Morrow	January 10, 2014	019	N/A
Goofy volunteers Mickey to fight a wrestler, Pete. Guest star: Rob Paulsen
17	17	"Third Wheel"	Clay Morrow	Derek Dressler, Clay Morrow, Paul Rudish, & Aaron Springer	Clay Morrow	February 14, 2014	011	N/A
Goofy invites himself on Mickey and Minnie's date, with disastrous consequences. Guest star: Paul Rudish Note: This episode features cameos by the title characters of Lady and the Tramp performing the iconic spaghetti scene.
18	18	"The Adorable Couple"	William Reiss	Darrick Bachman, Clay Morrow, William Reiss, & Paul Rudish	William Reiss	March 7, 2014	017	2.10
Mickey and Minnie try to make Donald and Daisy happy. Note: This episode features a cameo by the title characters of Beauty and the Beast.

=== Season 2 (2014–15) ===
No. overall	No. in season	Title	Directed by	Written by	Storyboard by	Original release date	Prod. code	US viewers (millions)
19	1	"Cable Car Chaos"	Aaron Springer	Darrick Bachman, Clay Morrow, Paul Rudish, & Aaron Springer	Aaron Springer	April 11, 2014	020	2.90
Mickey and Minnie must stop a runaway cable car as it careens through San Francisco's famous streets. Guest star: Aaron Springer
20	2	"Fire Escape"	Paul Rudish	Darrick Bachman, Cindy Morrow, Clay Morrow, Alonso Ramirez Ramos, & Paul Rudish	Alonso Ramirez Ramos	April 25, 2014	021	N/A
Mickey attempts to rescue Minnie from her apartment building when it appears to be on fire. Guest star: Paul Rudish
21	3	"Eau de Minnie"	Paul Rudish	Darrick Bachman, Aliki T. Grafft, Clay Morrow, & Paul Rudish	Aliki T. Grafft	May 23, 2014	022	2.80
Minnie enchants everyone around her with a new perfume called Entrancement when she was going to a date with Mickey. Guest stars: Paul Rudish, Fred Tatasciore, Aliki Theofilopoulous Grafft
22	4	"O Futebol Clássico"	Paul Rudish	Darrick Bachman, Derek Dressler, Clay Morrow, Alonso Ramirez Ramos, & Paul Rudish	Alonso Ramirez Ramos	June 6, 2014	015	2.60
Mickey tries desperately to find the perfect view at the 2014 FIFA World Cup in Brazil. This is José Carioca's first appearance in these cartoons. Guest star: Mark La Roya
23	5	"Down the Hatch"	Paul Rudish	Darrick Bachman, Heiko Drengenberg, Clay Morrow, Richard Pursel, & Paul Rudish	Heiko Drengenberg	June 20, 2014	025	2.40
Mickey and Goofy are zapped by Professor Ludwig Von Drake's shrinking ray and have an adventure inside Donald's body. Note 1: For the end credits, Donald sings "Miracles From Molecules", the original theme song from the former Tomorrowland attraction, Adventure Thru Inner Space. Note 2: This is Ludwig von Drake’s first appearance in these cartoons. Guest star: Corey Burton
24	6	"Goofy's Grandma"	Aaron Springer	Darrick Bachman, Clay Morrow, Paul Rudish, & Aaron Springer	Aaron Springer	July 11, 2014	027	2.85
Mickey agrees to let Goofy's grandmother stay at his house, but he soon learns that she isn't the sweet old lady she appears to be as she acts just like Goofy.
25	7	"Captain Donald"	Paul Rudish	Mark Ackland, Darrick Bachman, Cindy Morrow, Clay Morrow, & Paul Rudish	Mark Ackland	August 8, 2014	026	N/A
Mickey, Minnie and Daisy go sailing with Donald only to find out that Donald can't sail.
26	8	"Mumbai Madness"	Paul Rudish	Darrick Bachman, Alonso Ramirez Ramos, & Paul Rudish	Alonso Ramirez Ramos	September 26, 2014	028	N/A
Mickey tries to drive an elephant with a broken tusk to a mountain in Mumbai but gets lost along the way. Guest Star: Atul Singh
27	9	"The Boiler Room"	Paul Rudish	Darrick Bachman, Matt Chapman, Heiko Drengenberg, Clay Morrow, & Paul Rudish	Heiko Drengenberg	October 2, 2014	023	N/A
Mickey's attempts to fix Minnie's plumbing are foiled by a monster living in her boiler room.
28	10	"Space Walkies"	Paul Rudish	Darrick Bachman, Riccardo Durante, Richard Pursel, Alonso Ramirez Ramos, & Paul Rudish	Riccardo Durante	November 7, 2014	030	N/A
Astronauts Mickey and Pluto need to head back to their spaceship in time for landing on Earth after heading out to give Pluto some relief. Note: This is Chip 'n' Dale's first appearance in these cartoons.
29	11	"Mickey Monkey"	Aaron Springer	Darrick Bachman, Clay Morrow, Paul Rudish, & Aaron Springer	Aaron Springer	November 18, 2014	024	N/A
Mickey must stop a monkey from stealing his life after a mishap causes it to wind up with his clothes.
30	12	"Clogged"	Paul Rudish	Darrick Bachman, Chris Houghton, & Paul Rudish	Chris Houghton	December 12, 2014	031	N/A
In the Netherlands, Minnie attempts to make her windmill work in order to save a flower in her garden. Note: This is the first time Mickey is absent.
31	13	"Goofy's First Love"	Clay Morrow	Darrick Bachman, Clay Morrow, Paul Rudish & Aaron Springer	Clay Morrow	January 9, 2015	029	N/A
Mickey and Donald try to help a hapless Goofy woo the love of his life. Note: This is Scrooge McDuck's first appearance in these cartoons. Guest star: Alan Young
32	14	"Doggone Biscuits"	Eddie Trigueros	Darrick Bachman, Clay Morrow, Paul Rudish & Eddie Trigueros	Eddie Trigueros	January 16, 2015	032	2.43
After Minnie feeds Pluto too many dog treats, she must get him back into shape before Mickey comes home.
33	15	"Workin' Stiff"	Eddie Trigueros	Darrick Bachman, Cindy Morrow, Clay Morrow, Paul Rudish & Eddie Trigueros	Eddie Trigueros	February 20, 2015	033	N/A
Mickey and Donald struggle to get Goofy through a job interview while he's asleep.
34	16	"Al Rojo Vivo"	Dave Wasson	Mark Ackland, Darrick Bachman, Riccardo Durante, Paul Rudish & Dave Wasson	Mark Ackland, Riccardo Durante & Dave Wasson	March 27, 2015	034	N/A
When Pete flirts with Minnie during the Running of the Bulls in Pamplona, Spain, Mickey's literally red-hot temper gets one of the bulls mad at him.
35	17	"Bottle Shocked"	Heiko Drengenberg	Darrick Bachman, Heiko Drengenberg & Paul Rudish	Heiko Drengenberg	April 24, 2015	035	N/A
Mickey must protect a bottle of sparkling lemonade during the Monaco Grand Prix when everything in his surrounding environment threatens to break it on his way back to Minnie.
36	18	"A Flower for Minnie"	Dave Wasson	Mark Ackland, Darrick Bachman, Riccardo Durante, Paul Rudish, Andy Suriano & Dave Wasson	Mark Ackland, Riccardo Durante & Dave Wasson	May 29, 2015	038	N/A
Mickey sets out to find the perfect flower for Minnie, only to be foiled on nearly every attempt.
37	19	"Bronco Busted"	Dave Wasson	Darrick Bachman, Paul Rudish & Dave Wasson	Dave Wasson	June 9, 2015	036	N/A
Mickey, Goofy and Donald's car breaks down and when they can't afford to pay the fee, they try bronco busting to earn money, but they must find a horse to enter the rodeo.

=== Season 3 (2015–16) ===
No. overall	No. in season	Title	Directed by	Written by	Storyboard by	Original release date	Prod. code	US viewers (millions)
38	1	"Coned!"	Dave Wasson	Darrick Bachman, Clay Morrow, Paul Rudish, Dave Tennant & Dave Wasson	Dave Wasson	July 17, 2015	040	N/A
When Pluto is depressed due to having a dog cone over his head, Mickey also puts a cone onto his head to show that it's not so bad, but he ends up blindly putting himself in danger and Pluto must keep him safe.
39	2	"One Man Band"	Dave Wasson	Darrick Bachman, Paul Rudish & Dave Wasson	Dave Wasson	August 14, 2015	042	N/A
After finding a perfect spot to play his music, Mickey, who is a busker, attempts to flee guards in London.
40	3	"Wish Upon a Coin"	William Reiss	Darrick Bachman, Aliki T. Grafft, William Reiss, Paul Rudish & Dave Wasson	William Reiss	August 21, 2015	043	N/A
In a tribute to Walt Disney's Snow White and the Seven Dwarfs, Pete steals all the coins from a wishing well and it is up to Mickey to stop him and return the wishes. Note: This episode first premiered on August 14, 2015, at D23 Expo.
41	4	"Movie Time"	Dave Wasson	Darrick Bachman, Bernie Petterson, Paul Rudish, & Dave Wasson	Bernie Petterson & Dave Wasson	September 11, 2015	044	N/A
When he finds out that there are no snacks for his movie time with Minnie, Mickey must brave a big storm. Guest Stars: Roz Ryan and Dave Wasson
42	5	"Shifting Gears"	Clay Morrow	Derek Dressler, Clay Morrow, Paul Rudish & Aaron Springer	Clay Morrow	September 18, 2015	045	1.84
Mickey battles with his car after it refuses to drive him to the beach.
43	6	"Black and White"	Clay Morrow	Darrick Bachman, Clay Morrow, Paul Rudish & Dave Wasson	Clay Morrow	October 2, 2015	039	N/A
Mickey and Minnie watch a horror movie but when it gets to the scariest part, Mickey turns white as a ghost and his black color runs away scared.
44	7	"¡Feliz Cumpleaños!"	Alonso Ramirez Ramos	Darrick Bachman, Alonso Ramirez Ramos & Paul Rudish; Derek Dressler & Dave Wasson (Additional Story)	Alonso Ramirez Ramos	November 18, 2015	041	N/A
A group of pinatas threaten to ruin Mickey's birthday party in Mexico. Special guest: Danny Trejo as the Lead Piñata
45	8	"Wonders of the Deep"	Alonso Ramirez Ramos	Darrick Bachman, Alonso Ramirez Ramos, Paul Rudish & Dave Wasson	Alonso Ramirez Ramos	November 26, 2015	047	N/A
Mickey and Donald have to rescue Professor Von Drake when a freak accident sends him into the sea but they have to beware of the kraken (squid). Note: This episode is a 7-minute extended episode and the first one since "Potatoland", and features a cameo by Geppetto and Pinocchio.
46	9	"Road Hogs"	Paul Rudish	Darrick Bachman, Heiko Drengenberg & Paul Rudish	Heiko Drengenberg	December 11, 2015	046	N/A
Mickey and Minnie accidentally go inside a biker hangout full of hogs, and hilarious mayhem follows when the "Road Hogs" attempt to abduct Minnie, which they soon regret. Special guest: Clancy Brown as the pig bikers
47	10	"No"	Clay Morrow	Darrick Bachman, Clay Morrow, Paul Rudish, Dave Tennant & Dave Wasson	Clay Morrow	January 8, 2016	049	N/A
When people keep asking to borrow things from Mickey, he realizes that he has trouble saying "no" and asks Donald for help. Note: This is the last episode where Alan Young voices Scrooge.
48	11	"Roughin' It"	Dave Wasson	Darrick Bachman, Paul Rudish & Dave Wasson	Dave Wasson	January 22, 2016	050	N/A
Mickey's dream of camping the old-fashioned way is threatened when Donald shows up in a state-of-the-art RV.
49	12	"Dancevidaniya"	Dave Thomas	Mark Ackland, Darrick Bachman, Riccardo Durante & Paul Rudish	Mark Ackland & Riccardo Durante	February 5, 2016	037	N/A
Mickey faces Peg-Leg Pete in a Russian folk dance-off to rescue Minnie.
50	13	"Couple Sweaters"	William Reiss	Darrick Bachman, William Reiss & Paul Rudish	William Reiss	February 12, 2016	048	N/A
Mickey goes out on a date with Minnie, but he has to wear the most terrible and uncomfortable sweater ever made.
51	14	"Turkish Delights"	Clay Morrow	Darrick Bachman, Clay Morrow & Paul Rudish	Clay Morrow	March 18, 2016	053	N/A
In Turkey, Mickey is a street merchant selling Turkish delights, but must avoid Donald and Goofy, who are attempting to stop him from taking away their customers.
52	15	"Sock Burglar"	Paul Rudish	Darrick Bachman, Joe Pitt, Paul Rudish & Dave Wasson	Joe Pitt	April 15, 2016	051	N/A
After seeing people around town, including Mickey, with one sock stolen, Minnie decides to take matters into her own hands and tries to bag the culprit responsible for these sock-stealing schemes.
53	16	"Ku'u Lei Melody"	Alonso Ramirez Ramos	Darrick Bachman, Alonso Ramirez Ramos & Paul Rudish	Alonso Ramirez Ramos	April 22, 2016	052	N/A
Mickey's determination to write an elusive song leads him, Donald and Goofy on a hilariously mystical journey through the Hawaiian Islands. Note: This is a 7-minute extended episode.
54	17	"Entombed"	Dave Thomas	Darrick Bachman, Paul Rudish & Dave Thomas	Dave Thomas	May 13, 2016	055	N/A
Mickey and Minnie visit Egypt to search for a legendary pharaoh's tomb, but get separated along the way.
55	18	"No Reservations"	Eddie Trigueros	Mark Ackland, Darrick Bachman, Riccardo Durante, Paul Rudish & Eddie Trigueros	Mark Ackland, Riccardo Durante & Eddie Trigueros	June 3, 2016	056	N/A
Minnie, Daisy, and Clarabelle Cow all try to get into an exclusive restaurant, but the restaurant's snooty flamingo maître'd is determined not to let them in.
56	19	"Split Decision"	Dave Wasson	Darrick Bachman, Paul Rudish & Dave Wasson	Dave Wasson	June 9, 2016	054	N/A
Mickey is forced to wrangle two very different Donalds after Professor Von Drake's latest invention splits him in half. Note: This is a 7-minute extended episode.
57	20	"Good Sports"	Paul Rudish	Darrick Bachman, Heiko Drengenberg, Paul Rudish & Eddie Trigueros	Heiko Drengenberg & Eddie Trigueros	July 29, 2016	057	N/A
In the style of the Goofy sports cartoons, Mickey (who is dressed like Howard Cosell) narrates to a basketball team of Goofys the difference between good sportsmanship and bad sportsmanship.

=== Specials (2016–17) ===
No.	Title	Directed by	Written by	Storyboard by	Original release date	Prod. code	US viewers (millions)
58	"Duck the Halls: A Mickey Mouse Christmas Special"	Alonso Ramirez Ramos and Dave Wasson	Darrick Bachman, Alonso Ramirez Ramos, Paul Rudish and Dave Wasson; Darrick Bachman (Story by) Craig Lewis (Additional Written Material)	Alonso Ramirez Ramos and Dave Wasson; Dave Thomas and Eddie Trigueros (additional storyboards)	December 9, 2016	058	1.62
It is touch-and-go for Donald when, instead of heading south with Daisy and all the other ducks for the winter, he insists on staying with Mickey and the gang to enjoy all that Christmas has to offer, but becomes critically ill, although he tries not to show it. When it does surface, Mickey and the gang have to rush to the south to restore Donald back to health before he dies.
67	"The Scariest Story Ever: A Mickey Mouse Halloween Spooktacular!"	Alonso Ramirez Ramos, Eddie Trigueros and Dave Wasson	Darrick Bachman, Alonso Ramirez Ramos, Paul Rudish, Eddie Trigueros and Dave Wasson; Darrick Bachman (Story by)	Alonso Ramirez Ramos, Eddie Trigueros and Dave Wasson	October 8, 2017	60	0.94
For Halloween, Mickey plans to tell scary stories to Donald, Goofy, Huey, Dewey, Louie, Morty and Ferdie. However, his attempt goes downhill as his stories don't seem to be scary enough. Note: This episode was released on DVD and the Disney Channel App on September 26, 2017, before its television premiere. Guest Stars: Mickey's nephews Morty and Ferdie make their first appearance in the special.

=== Season 4 (2017–18) ===
No. overall	No. in season	Title	Directed by	Written by	Storyboard by	Original release date	Prod. code	US viewers (millions)
59	1	"Swimmin' Hole"	Dave Wasson	Darrick Bachman, Paul Rudish & Dave Wasson	Dave Wasson	June 9, 2017	059	N/A
When Pegleg Pete steals the ol' swimmin' hole, Mickey, Donald and Goofy attempt to get it back from him.
60	2	"Canned"	Paul Rudish	Darrick Bachman, Joe Pitt & Paul Rudish	Joe Pitt	June 23, 2017	058	N/A
An old lady needs help moving a huge load of trash from her backyard to the curb for a junkman to pick up. Mickey promises to help before discovering just how much trash there actually is.: Note: Oswald the Lucky Rabbit makes a cameo appearance in this episode.
61	3	"Touchdown and Out"	Dave Thomas	Darrick Bachman, Paul Rudish & Dave Thomas	Dave Thomas	July 14, 2017	060	N/A
Mickey, Donald and Goofy play a game of football against Pegleg Pete, the Beagle Boys and Chernabog.
62	4	"Locked in Love"	Alonso Ramirez Ramos	Darrick Bachman, Alonso Ramirez Ramos & Paul Rudish	Alonso Ramirez Ramos	July 28, 2017	061	N/A
In Seoul, South Korea, Mickey and Minnie accidentally get locked together in a lock meaning to symbolize their love, and must work together to get the key back. Guest Stars: Julia Cho and Joseph Lim Kim
63	5	"Bee Inspired"	Eddie Trigueros	Darrick Bachman, Paul Rudish & Eddie Trigueros	Eddie Trigueros	August 11, 2017	062	N/A
Minnie Mouse needs inspiration for her paintings and Mickey tries to help by posing with a flower. However, Spike the Bee won't leave him alone.
64	6	"Shipped Out"	Dave Wasson	Darrick Bachman, Paul Rudish & Dave Wasson	Dave Wasson	August 25, 2017	063	N/A
Mickey and Minnie go on a cruise ship to relax but because they're in the VIP Experience they find themselves forced to endure all the activities. Guest Star: Illya Owens
65	7	"Three-Legged Race"	Dave Thomas	Darrick Bachman, Paul Rudish & Dave Thomas	Dave Thomas	September 15, 2017	064	N/A
Mickey and Pete team up to win a three-legged race but Pete has dirty tricks up his sleeve in order to win the race so Mickey has to finish the race fair and square by himself.
66	8	"Nature's Wonderland"	Dave Thomas	Darrick Bachman, Paul Rudish & Dave Thomas	Dave Thomas	October 6, 2017	064	0.94
While touring Disneyland's "Mine Train Through Nature's Wonderland" attraction, Mickey and Minnie get lost trying to find the "Rainbow Caverns" which leads to an adventure that's not on the map.
68	9	"The Birthday Song"	Alonso Ramirez Ramos	Darrick Bachman, Alonso Ramirez Ramos & Paul Rudish	Alonso Ramirez Ramos	November 16, 2017	065	N/A
Minnie prepares an original song for Mickey's birthday, but things become complicated when the notes literally run off the page.
69	10	"The Perfect Dream"	Eddie Trigueros	Darrick Bachman, Paul Rudish & Eddie Trigueros	Eddie Trigueros	December 22, 2017	066	N/A
Various noises during nighttime prevent Mickey from going back to sleep and resuming his dream about kissing Minnie.
70	11	"Feed the Birds"	Eddie Trigueros	Darrick Bachman, Paul Rudish & Eddie Trigueros	Eddie Trigueros	January 12, 2018	068	N/A
In this Mary Poppins-inspired short, Mickey goes outside his house to feed the pigeons but they all torment a small bluebird named Tuppence.
71	12	"Carnaval"	Alonso Ramirez Ramos	Darrick Bachman, Alonso Ramirez Ramos & Paul Rudish	Alonso Ramirez Ramos	February 3, 2018	071	N/A
Mickey races to save Minnie after her feathered costume literally takes flight during Rio's Carnaval.
72	13	"Year of the Dog"	Dave Thomas	Darrick Bachman, Paul Rudish & Dave Thomas	Dave Thomas	February 10, 2018	069	N/A
In Shanghai, Mickey's Lunar New Year feast is placed in jeopardy when Pluto after being mistaken for a mysterious creature steals the main course.
73	14	"The Fancy Gentleman"	Dave Wasson	Darrick Bachman, Paul Rudish & Dave Wasson	Dave Wasson	March 10, 2018	070	N/A
After watching a romantic movie, Minnie decides to hire an instructor to teach Mickey how to be a fancy gentleman but the results aren't all that she hoped for. Guest Stars: John O'Hurley, John Waters, Illya Owens, and Dave Wasson
74	15	"New Shoes"	Eddie Trigueros	Darrick Bachman, Paul Rudish & Eddie Trigueros	Eddie Trigueros	April 14, 2018	072	0.78
After Pete gives them a huge wallop, Mickey, Donald and Goofy switch bodies, with Mickey in Goofy's body, Donald in Mickey's body and Goofy in Donald's body. Note: This is a 7-minute extended episode.
75	16	"Springtime"	Alonso Ramirez Ramos	Darrick Bachman, Alonso Ramirez Ramos & Paul Rudish	Alonso Ramirez Ramos	May 12, 2018	074	N/A
In this tribute to Fantasia, Mickey portrays the spirit of spring, who takes on Old Man Winter (portrayed by Pegleg Pete), who wants to make winter longer.
76	17	"Dumb Luck"	Dave Wasson	Darrick Bachman, Paul Rudish & Dave Wasson	Dave Wasson	June 8, 2018	073	N/A
Mickey desperately searches for a good charm after being cursed with seven years of bad luck.
77	18	"Flushed!"	Paul Rudish	Darrick Bachman, Mike Bell & Paul Rudish	Mike Bell	June 30, 2018	075	N/A
Mickey goes down the underground sewer system to save Gubbles after accidentally flushed away the toilet.
78	19	"Roll 'em"	Eddie Trigueros	Darrick Bachman, Paul Rudish & Eddie Trigueros	Eddie Trigueros	July 14, 2018	076	N/A
Mickey and Minnie race to capture a runaway film reel as it wreaks havoc around a big Hollywood movie studio. Guest Star: Jeff Bennett

=== Season 5 (2018–19) ===
No. overall	No. in season	Title	Directed by	Written by	Storyboard by	Original release date	Prod. code	US viewers (millions)
79	1	"Amore Motore"	Alonso Ramirez Ramos	Darrick Bachman, Alonso Ramirez Ramos & Paul Rudish	Alonso Ramirez Ramos	October 6, 2018	503	N/A
Mickey helps his scooter woo the bike of his dreams after seeing her on the streets of Rome. Guest Stars: Alice Lussiana Parente and Paul Rudish.
80	2	"A Pete Scorned"	Dave Wasson	Darrick Bachman, Paul Rudish & Dave Wasson	Dave Wasson	October 20, 2018	502	N/A
Pegleg Pete becomes jealous when Mortimer Mouse proves to be a worse foe to Mickey. Guest Star: Jeff Bennett
81	3	"House Painters"	Eddie Trigueros	Darrick Bachman, Paul Rudish & Eddie Trigueros	Eddie Trigueros	November 3, 2018	504	N/A
Mickey, Donald and Goofy attempt to paint Minnie's house with amusing results.
82	4	"Surprise!"	Clay Morrow	Darrick Bachman, Clay Morrow & Paul Rudish	Clay Morrow	November 18, 2018	501	0.63
Mickey's wish for a surprise-free birthday ends up becoming the biggest surprise of his life. Note 1: This episode was released on Mickey’s 90th birthday. Note 2: This is a 7-minute extended episode.
83	5	"Hats Enough"	Clay Morrow	Darrick Bachman, Clay Morrow & Paul Rudish	Clay Morrow	December 8, 2018	505	N/A
Mickey suffers an identity crisis after realizing that all of his friends have signature hats, but he has nothing.
84	6	"Safari, So Good"	Eddie Trigueros	Darrick Bachman, Paul Rudish, & Eddie Trigueros	Eddie Trigueros	January 12, 2019	508	N/A
Mickey and Minnie gleefully set out to cross Africa's Serengeti after missing the bus back to their hometown.
85	7	"For Whom the Booth Tolls"	Alonso Ramirez Ramos	Darrick Bachman, Alonso Ramirez Ramos & Paul Rudish	Alonso Ramirez Ramos	February 9, 2019	507	N/A
Mickey is haunted by guilt after failing to pay the fee at a toll booth, which quickly becomes a reality when he and Minnie realize the toll booth is chasing them.
86	8	"Outta Time"	Dave Wasson	Darrick Bachman, Paul Rudish & Dave Wasson	Dave Wasson	February 23, 2019	509	0.48
Mickey and Donald set out to rescue Goofy after he time travels back to the past in one of Professor Von Drake's inventions. Note: This is the final 7-minute extended episode of the series.
87	9	"My Little Garden"	Dave Wasson	Darrick Bachman, Paul Rudish & Dave Wasson	Dave Wasson	March 9, 2019	506	N/A
Mickey attempts to trim his little garden after it grows into an unruly, wild jungle.
88	10	"You, Me and Fifi"	Eddie Trigueros	Darrick Bachman, Paul Rudish, & Eddie Trigueros	Eddie Trigueros	March 23, 2019	510	N/A
Mickey seeks to win the love of Minnie's feisty, little dog, Fifi.
89	11	"Outback at Ya!"	Clay Morrow	Darrick Bachman, Clay Morrow & Paul Rudish	Clay Morrow	April 6, 2019	511	N/A
Mickey's desire to throw a boomerang in the Australian outback creates a series of dangerous, unintended consequences. Guest Star: Tim Wright
90	12	"Our Homespun Melody"	Alonso Ramirez Ramos	Darrick Bachman, Alonso Ramirez Ramos & Paul Rudish	Alonso Ramirez Ramos	April 20, 2019	512	N/A
Mickey attempts to cure his prize-winning pig after he loses his adorable squeal. Guest Stars: Alvyn Chea and Elyse Willis.
91	13	"Over the Moon"	Clay Morrow	Darrick Bachman, Clay Morrow & Paul Rudish	Clay Morrow	May 4, 2019	513	N/A
Mickey and Minnie are led around the world on a never-ending quest for romance by their biggest fan, the moon. Guest star: Tom Kenny as the Moon.
92	14	"Easy Street"	Dave Wasson	Darrick Bachman, Paul Rudish & Dave Wasson	Dave Wasson	May 18, 2019	515	N/A
Pluto turns jealous after Goofy moves in and starts behaving like Mickey's new dog.
93	15	"Two Can't Play"	Eddie Trigueros	Darrick Bachman, Paul Rudish, & Eddie Trigueros	Eddie Trigueros	June 8, 2019	514	N/A
Mickey and Minnie attempt to beat Donald and Daisy in a game of doubles tennis.
94	16	"Our Floating Dreams"	Alonso Ramirez Ramos	Darrick Bachman, Alonso Ramirez Ramos, & Paul Rudish	Alonso Ramirez Ramos	June 22, 2019	516	N/A
Mickey and Minnie vie for the perfect spot to sell their goods at one of Thailand's busiest floating markets.
95	17	"Gone to Pieces"	Clay Morrow	Darrick Bachman, Clay Morrow & Paul Rudish	Clay Morrow	July 6, 2019	517	N/A
Mickey and Donald struggle to rebuild their best friend trio after Goofy gets broken into a pile of incomprehensible pieces.
96	18	"Carried Away"	Eddie Trigueros	Darrick Bachman, Paul Rudish, & Eddie Trigueros	Eddie Trigueros	July 20, 2019	518	N/A
Minnie performs a song, "Carried Away", she wrote for Mickey, who literally must protect them from dangers happening around them and their flowing canoe. Note: Russi Taylor, the longtime voice of Minnie Mouse, died of colon cancer six days after this episode aired.
