= Mickey & Minnie's Runaway Railway =

Trackless dark ride

- Attraction logo at Disneyland

Disney's Hollywood Studios
- Area: Hollywood Boulevard
- Coordinates: 28.356232°N 81.560483°W
- Status: Operating
- Opening date: March 4, 2020
- Replaced: The Great Movie Ride

Disneyland
- Area: Mickey's Toontown
- Status: Operating
- Soft opening date: January 25, 2023
- Opening date: January 27, 2023
- Replaced: Toontown Five and Dime; Gag Factory

Ride statistics
- Attraction type: Trackless dark ride
- Designer: Walt Disney Imagineering
- Theme: Mickey Mouse
- Music: "Nothing Can Stop Us Now" by Christopher Willis (music) and Elyse Willis (lyrics)
- Vehicle type: Trackless Vehicle
- Riders per vehicle: 32
- Rows: 8
- Riders per row: 4
- Lightning Lane Available
- Must transfer from wheelchair

Mickey & Minnie's Runaway Railway is a trackless dark ride located at the Walt Disney World Resort in Bay Lake, Florida, and at the Disneyland Resort in Anaheim, California. The attraction, the first Mickey Mouse-themed ride-through attraction at a Disney theme park, features an original story based on the stylized world from the Paul Rudish television series.

The attraction was first announced for Disney's Hollywood Studios at the D23 Expo in July 2017 as part of the unveiling of 23 improvements to Disney Parks, including four new rides across the Florida theme parks. At Walt Disney World, the attraction opened in Disney's Hollywood Studios on March 4, 2020, and is housed within the park's replica of Grauman's Chinese Theatre, replacing The Great Movie Ride. At Disneyland, the attraction opened in Mickey's Toontown on January 27, 2023, and is housed in a new show building within the El CapiTOON Theater, a pun on the El Capitan Theatre.

== Premise ==
At the beginning of the ride, guests are invited to watch the premiere of a new Mickey Mouse cartoon, Perfect Picnic, in which Mickey and Minnie Mouse prepare for a picnic outing and encounter Goofy driving a train. According to Imagineer Kevin Rafferty, guests then pass through a simulated movie screen where they will experience a "zippy zany out-of-control adventure". Guests will then be transported into the cartoon and aboard Goofy's train, which takes them on a wild adventure.

The ride features a new technology known as "2 and 1/2 D" (3D without glasses) to give depth to the 2D environments. It also includes more hidden Mickeys than any existing ride.

== Summary ==
The premise of the ride is that guests are invited to the movie theater to watch the premiere of a brand new Mickey Mouse cartoon, Perfect Picnic.

=== Facade ===
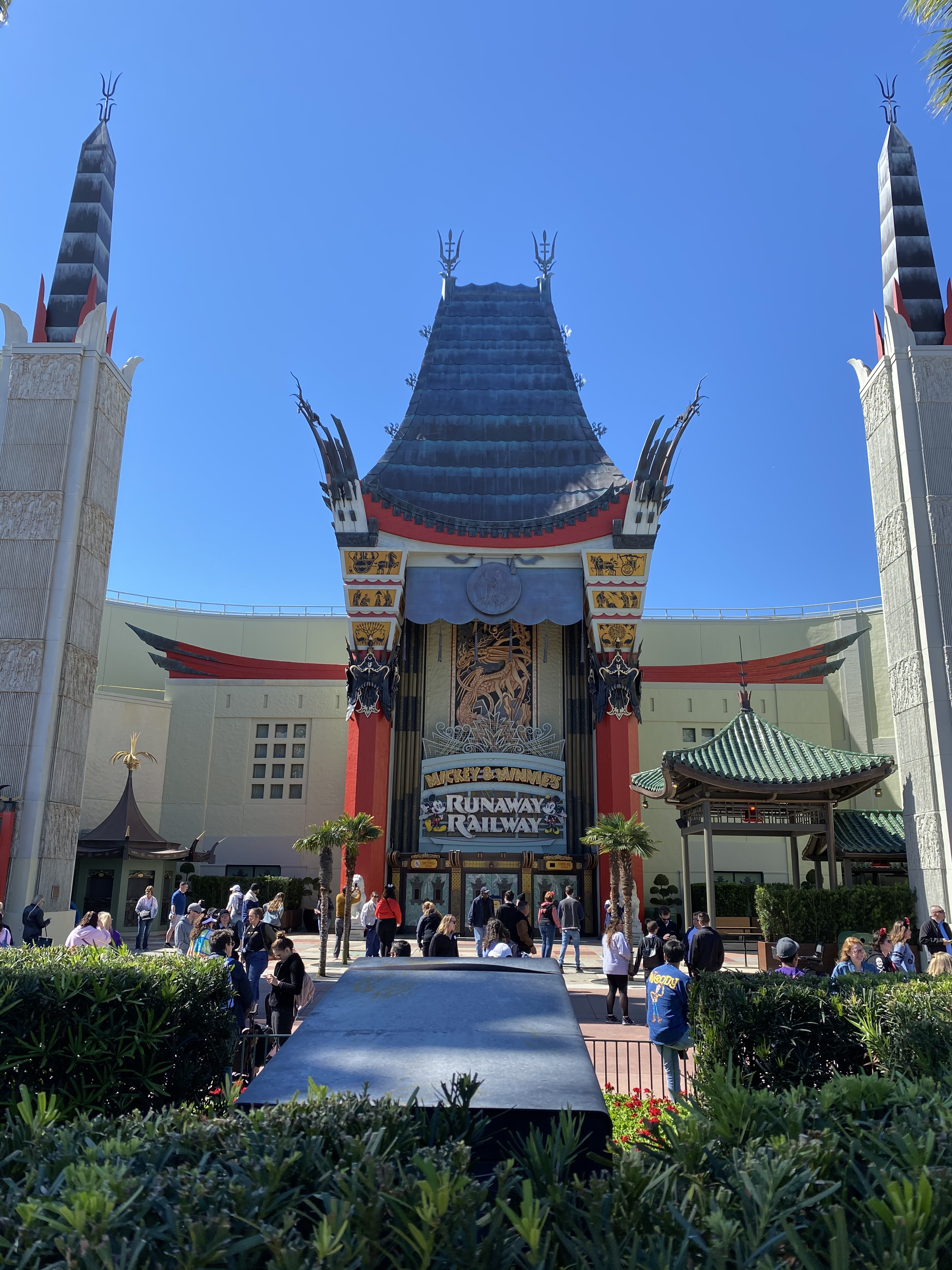
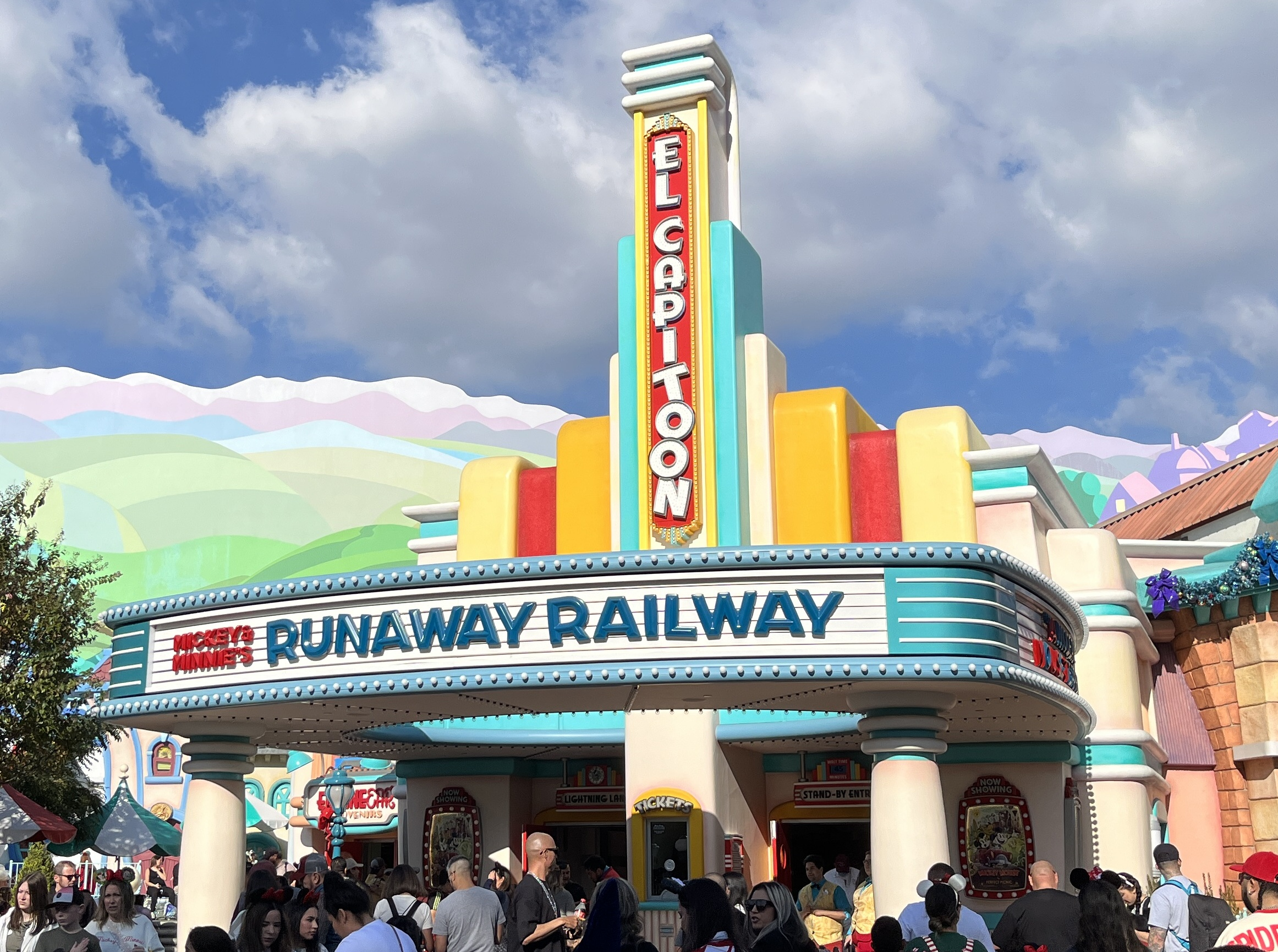
Attraction entrance at Disney's Hollywood Studios (top) and Disneyland (bottom).

For the Hollywood Studios version at Disney World, the ride is located at the end of Hollywood Boulevard in the full-scale replica of the Grauman's Chinese Theatre, which formerly housed The Great Movie Ride.

For the Disneyland version, the ride is located in Mickey's Toontown, inside the El CapiTOON Theater, a pun on the El Capitan Theatre (which is owned by Disney) in Hollywood.

=== Queue ===
The movie theater queue experience is different, depending on the location.

- In the Disney's Hollywood Studios version, guests enter the Chinese Theatre and wind through the lobby, adorned with a series of posters of Mickey Mouse shorts that might have previously premiered there. Beside the poster artwork for Perfect Picnic are nine posters for real-life Mickey Mouse shorts: "Croissant de Triomphe", "Mumbai Madness", "Potatoland", "Split Decision", "Three-Legged Race", "Tokyo Go", "Wish Upon a Coin", "Wonders of the Deep", and "Yodelberg". The posters were created for the attraction by Walt Disney Imagineering and Disney Television Animation. In addition to the ones listed above, the Disneyland version also features posters for the following shorts: "Carried Away", "One Man Band", "O Sole Minnie", and "Roll 'Em".
- In the Disneyland version, the queue features a special exhibit put together by the Toontown Hysterical Society called "Mickey Through the Ears", showcasing Mickey's career with costumes, posters, and props from the toon world. In addition to the nine Mickey Mouse shorts posters seen from Chinese Theatre, the queue also has multiple posters parodying live-action films from Walt Disney Pictures with characters from the Mickey Mouse universe such as Newsies (1992), The Absent-Minded Professor (1961), The Parent Trap (1998), The Mighty Ducks (1992), Freaky Friday (1976), High School Musical 3: Senior Year (2008), Honey, I Shrunk the Kids (1989), The Rocketeer (1991), Hocus Pocus (1993), and The Happiest Millionaire (1967).

The end of the queue experience is the same in both locations. The guests reach the auditorium where the short, Perfect Picnic will be premiering. The doors open and they enter the auditorium. Once the auditorium doors close, the cartoon begins on the movie screen.

=== Pre-show ===
The short begins with Mickey, Minnie, and Pluto setting out for a picnic at the Runnamuck Park, singing "Nothing Can Stop Us Now". While packing Mickey's car, Minnie accidentally packs Pluto with the picnic basket in the trunk. The duo make their way to the park. Along the way, Mickey and Minnie drive alongside Goofy, who is operating the Runnamuck Railroad train that surrounds the park. Mickey and Minnie pull forward and hit a bump on the railroad crossing. The trunk pops open, releasing Pluto and the picnic basket into the air, which Pluto quickly manages to save. However, a pie from the basket falls out and lands on top of the train's smokestack. With the pie clogging the smokestack, the train picks up speed. Goofy panics as the train pulls into a railroad barn, where an explosion occurs, causing a large, ragged hole to appear in the movie screen (which is created by a hidden mechanism trick and therefore literally breaking the fourth wall). When the smoke clears, Goofy lands on a loose board on the outside of the barn. Seeing the guests, Goofy offers them to take a ride on the train. He then asks a nearby cast member to help the guests step inside the cartoon while he goes back to the barn to fix the train. Upon walking through the movie screen, guests would find themselves inside the cartoon railroad station, and they make their way towards the loading platform where the train arrives.

=== Ride experience ===
Once the train stops at the loading station, guests board one of four cars behind the locomotive. The train then departs the station and makes a left turn, passing the park on a musical sunny day before entering a tunnel. Once inside, Goofy opens the back window and asks the guests if they are ready for a tour around the park. Mickey and Minnie pull alongside the train and exchange greetings. Mickey parks next to a railroad switch lever/drives and asks Goofy to take care of the guests. Goofy proudly exclaims, "Gawrsh! They're with me. What could possibly go wrong? Well, back to work." Goofy closes his window and begins to sing "I've Been Working on the Railroad" when the nearby switch lever falls/or when Mickey hits the track switch, causing it to spin and face the wrong direction, disconnecting the cars from Goofy's locomotive. The locomotive makes a left, while the cars with guests make a right. Mickey and Minnie race after the runaway train.

The cars exit the tunnel into a desert with Mickey and Minnie on horses trying to round up the cars. They become tangled in their ropes as vultures swoop in to attack. The cars then enter an amusement park where Mickey and Minnie float in attached to balloons (if the animatronic is not working, they will appear as a projection on screen instead). Before they can make their way down, the twister logo on the side of the park's wooden roller coaster comes to life, sending everything into a frenzy. Each car moves into a dark room with the tornado at its center in which the tornado is sweeping up the train cars. Mickey, Minnie, and Pluto are seen swirling around. In the next room, the train cars and the duo lands on a tropical island where a volcanic eruption occurs. Each of the four cars enter their own separate coves that are partially enclosed with individual screens. Mickey and Minnie are shown to be caught in a rapid downstream heading toward a waterfall. Guests are seemingly following close behind and fall with them into the water, emerging moments later in an underwater city. It is filled with a variety of animated sea life moving to music with some playing instruments.

The scene transitions into a sewage system where the water drains away, where, in Disneyland’s version, Pluto can be seen swirling around, going down, and grabbing the picnic basket, and the cars move into another room depicting the downtown of a large city at night. Pete can be seen with a jackhammer doing construction work and laughing, while Donald Duck is spotted in a delivery van. The cars veer left into a room designed as a dance studio, and Daisy Duck leads them into a waltz followed by a conga. The cars dance their way into a back alley and into a factory, as Minnie warns not to enter. The cars then appear to be stuck on a conveyor belt moving toward a smasher. Mickey and Minnie eventually manage to pull a switch that shuts down the factory and transforms it into a moonlit night at the park. The cars reverse and turn around, and, in Disneyland's version, travel through a barn, moving into another room where Mickey, Minnie, and Pluto are finally having their picnic. The lead car reattaches to the locomotive helmed by Goofy, who tells guests that his "guided tour" has concluded and thanks them for staying with him. The train pulls around the corner to find Mickey, Minnie, and Pluto having a picnic singing one final rendition of "Nothing Can Stop Us Now" while fireworks go off in the sky above and over the guests. Goofy waves goodbye, closes the back window, and is heard discovering a lever wondering what it does. Just before the train returns to the station, he pulls it, triggering a small explosion inside his cab followed by his signature holler, giving riders one last surprise as the ride seat vibrates. The train then pulls back into the barn, where Goofy thanks the guests for riding with him and tells them to exit safely and asks for them to come back soon. As guests leave the station, they pass through the movie screen to return to the real world, with the title card saying “The End” displayed on the screen as guests leave the auditorium.

== Voice cast ==
- Chris Diamantopoulos as Mickey Mouse
- Russi Taylor as Minnie Mouse
- Tony Anselmo as Donald Duck
- Bill Farmer as Goofy and Pluto
- Jim Cummings as Pete
- Tress MacNeille as Daisy Duck

== Spin-off attraction ==
Located on the Disney Wish, Disney Cruise Line's newest ship, is the Aqua Mouse. The Aqua Mouse is a water coaster that features a dark ride portion at the beginning on the ride. Two different stories play, both of which take place in the same cartoon universe that inspired Mickey and Minnie's Runaway Railway.
