= Star Wars: Path of the Jedi =

Disneyland attraction

Star Wars Path of the Jedi
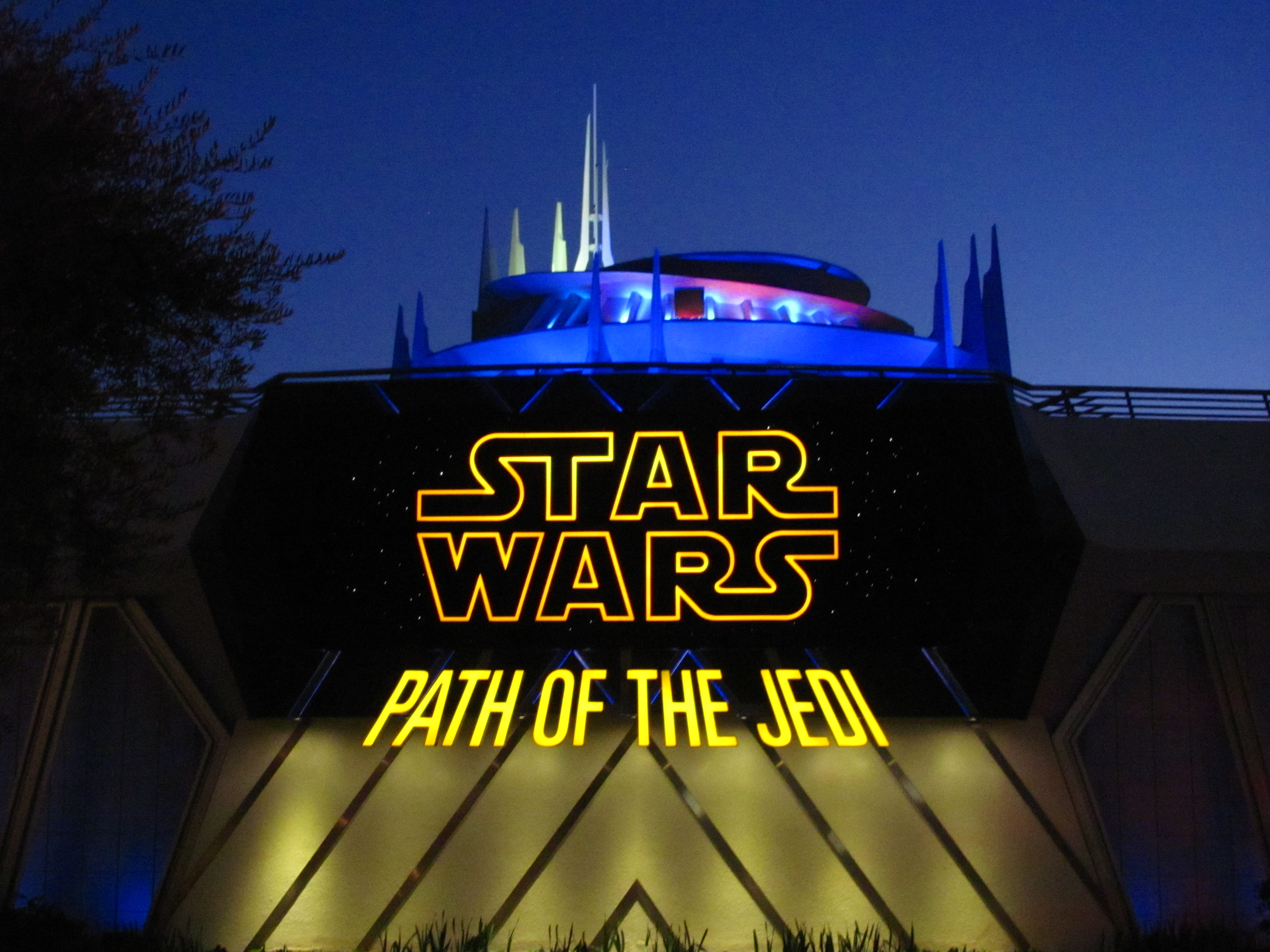
- Facade of Star Wars: Path of the Jedi in Disneyland with Space Mountain in the background

Disneyland
- Area: Tomorrowland
- Status: Removed
- Opening date: November 16, 2015 (original); March 5, 2019 (second run)
- Closing date: May 28, 2018 (original); March 14, 2020 (second run)
- Replaced: Captain EO Tribute
- Replaced by: Pixar Short Film Spotlight

Disney's Hollywood Studios
- Area: Echo Lake
- Status: Removed
- Opening date: December 4, 2015
- Closing date: January 1, 2019
- Replaced: Sounds Dangerous!
- Replaced by: Vacation Fun

Shanghai Disneyland
- Area: Tomorrowland
- Status: Removed
- Soft opening date: June 11, 2016
- Opening date: June 16, 2016
- Closing date: June 2019

Disneyland Park (Paris)
- Area: Discoveryland
- Status: Removed
- Opening date: May 7, 2017
- Closing date: March 5, 2018
- Replaced: Disney & Pixar: Short Film Festival
- Replaced by: Mickey et son Orchestre PhilharMagique

Ride statistics
- Attraction type: film with special effects
- Theme: Star Wars

Star Wars: Path of the Jedi was a guest experience formerly located in Disneyland, Disney's Hollywood Studios, Shanghai Disneyland, and Disneyland Paris. It was located in Tomorrowland (Disneyland), Tomorrowland (Shanghai Disneyland), Echo Lake (Disney's Hollywood Studios), and Discoveryland (Disneyland Paris) section of the parks. It was a montage of assorted scenes from all of the Star Wars films, shown thematically rather than chronologically. When it first opened, it just featured scenes from the first six films. However, before each subsequent film was released a sneak preview was added, which led to scenes from that film being added to the main film.

== Disney's Hollywood Studios ==
The attraction opened on July 4, 2014, in the Echo Lake section of the park. It was presented in the ABC Sound Studio, the former home of Sounds Dangerous!, which is replaced. Its run was often interrupted by previews for then current or upcoming Disney movies. After many updates, and a seasonal run for a year, the attraction was permanently closed on December 31, 2018. It was replaced by Mickey Shorts Theater, which redecorated the theater and seats with a Mickey Mouse theme. The theater had not been redecorated for the Path of the Jedi, and until this point retained the theming from Sounds Dangerous, which was very similar to the original theme of the theater. It opened on March 4, 2020, alongside the headliner attraction, Mickey & Minnie's Runaway Railway, and featured a short about Mickey and Minnie going on vacation.

== Disneyland ==
The attraction opened on April 17, 2015, replacing Captain EO. Captain EO was only supposed to have a temporary run, after the death of Michael Jackson, but it lasted over four years until being replaced in mid-2014. Similar to the Hollywood Studios version, its run was also interrupted multiple times to show previews for Disney movies. However, this occurred less often than in Hollywood Studios due to the availability of more theaters to show previews in at the Disneyland Resort. The attraction closed May 28, 2018, and reopened March 5, 2019. The attraction closed again on March 14, 2020, with the rest of the park. The attraction did not re-open with the rest of the park on April 30, 2021, and its queue was replaced by a seating area.
