= Sounds Dangerous! =

Defunct theme park audio show at Disney's Hollywood Studios

Coordinates: 28°21′22″N 81°33′33″W

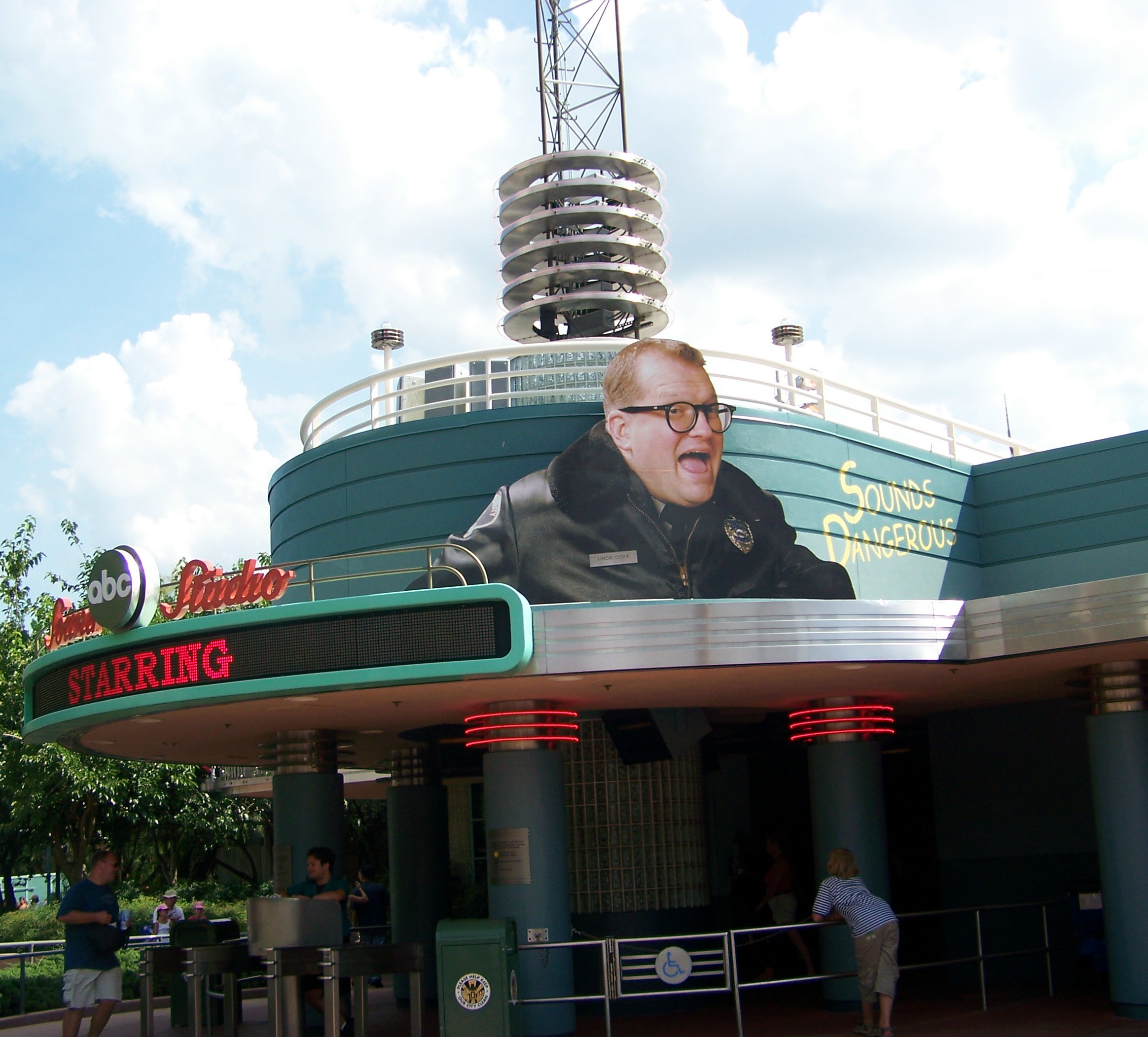

Disney MGM Studios
- Area: Echo Lake
- Status: Removed
- Opening date: April 22, 1999
- Closing date: May 18, 2012
- Replaced: Monster Sound Show/One Saturday Morning Sound Show
- Replaced by: Star Wars: Path of the Jedi

Ride statistics
- Attraction type: Audio show
- Designer: Walt Disney Imagineering
- Duration: 12 minutes
- Host: Foster (played by Drew Carey
- Wheelchair accessible
- Assistive listening available

Sounds Dangerous! was an audio show at Echo Lake inside Disney MGM Studios starring comedian Drew Carey that opened on April 22, 1999. The presentation took place inside an ABC soundstage with theater-style seating. Guests were told that the show was an ABC test pilot called Undercover Live. Guests wore headphones and were in the dark for the majority of the show, although visuals were also utilized on a projection screen in front of the guests. Drew Carey played an undercover detective named Foster.

In early 2009, it was announced that the attraction would operate seasonally. The image of Drew Carey along with the attraction's name was removed from the entrance's marquee and the screen was turned off, indicating the closure of the attraction, which meant that Disney closed the attraction on May 18, 2012, renaming it as ABC Sound Studio (which was also the name of the show that preceded Sounds Dangerous!), and redressing it as the temporary "Carbon Freeze Me" attraction for the park's annual Star Wars Weekends event.

Starting April 18, 2014, the theater was used to present a sneak peek of Walt Disney Pictures' Maleficent. Beginning July 4, 2014, the theater was used to present a sneak peek of Marvel Studios' Guardians of the Galaxy. From June 17 to December 3, 2015, the theater was used to show the short film Frozen Fever, as part of the Frozen Summer Fun event at the park. From December 4, 2015, to May 14, 2018, the theater showed Star Wars: Path of the Jedi, as part of Season of the Force. On March 4, 2020, the theater was renamed the Mickey Shorts Theater and the seats were given a Mickey Mouse design. It currently shows the Vacation Fun Mickey Mouse short. It opened concurrently with Mickey & Minnie's Runaway Railway.
