= Paul Rudish =

American animator

- Occupations: Animator, storyboard artist, writer, voice actor
- Years active: 1985–present

Paul Rudish is an American animator, storyboard artist, writer, and voice actor. He is originally known for his art, writing, and design work at Cartoon Network Studios on series created by Genndy Tartakovsky. He went on to co-create the series Sym-Bionic Titan and, in 2013, created, developed, wrote, storyboarded, executive produced, and directed a revival of the Mickey Mouse short cartoons.

He has cited works from Looney Tunes (mainly Chuck Jones, Bob Clampett and Tex Avery), Walt Disney, Craig McCracken, Stephen Hillenburg, Frank Frazetta, Ub Iwerks, and Genndy Tartakovsky as his inspirations. He also credited his father Rich Rudish as well as Disney artist Mary Blair.

== Career ==
Rudish's father, Rich Rudish, created the character Rainbow Brite for Hallmark and was art director for the 1985 animated film Rainbow Brite and the Star Stealer. Rudish went into animation, too, studying in the Character Animation program at California Institute of the Arts. Rudish did character design and storyboard work early in his career, most notably for Batman: The Animated Series. When Cartoon Network started producing new shows as Cartoon Network Studios, he quickly expanded into new roles on series created by Genndy Tartakovsky and Craig McCracken. He wrote, designed characters, or directed art for episodes of series including Dexter's Laboratory, The Powerpuff Girls, and Samurai Jack.

He moved up to directing art for the entire production of the 2003 Star Wars: Clone Wars miniseries.

In 2010, Rudish earned his first co-creator credit for the series Sym-Bionic Titan, which he co-created with Tartakovsky and Samurai Jack writer Bryan Andrews. He wrote the series and also designed the characters and Sym-Bionic Units. Around the same time, he provided development art for the first two seasons of My Little Pony: Friendship Is Magic.

=== Mickey Mouse ===
Rudish's next project saw him work with characters not created by either him, Tartakovsky or McCracken: Mickey Mouse and friends. Rudish created, executive-produced and directed a new series of 3.5-7 minute episodes titled simply Mickey Mouse. The series uses the character designs and personalities from the earliest Mickey, Donald Duck, and Goofy shorts, even using lesser known characters such as Clarabelle Cow.

Many of the shorts use a classic story structure in which Mickey must overcome a series of obstacles to achieve a seemingly simple goal, though some highlight the more playful aspects of animation, such as Mickey's cartoony evasive moves in "No Service" or the ability of characters to detach and reattach their ears (complete with temporary deafness) in "Bad Ear Day". Despite the retro feel, the developers used modern animation techniques and tools.

Further, they did update some elements, most notably the vivid, detailed backgrounds and super-smooth animation in fast-paced scenes. They also took stylistic risks, basing some episodes entirely in foreign countries. In most of these, the characters speak sparingly, if at all, while in "Croissant de Triomphe", set in Paris, the characters speak entirely in French. The first episode, "No Service", was released on June 28, 2013, on Disney Channel, Disney.com and WATCH Disney Channel.

A sequel series The Wonderful World of Mickey Mouse, premiered on November 18, 2020 (Mickey's 92nd birthday), on Disney+ with Rudish returning for the show.

== Filmography ==
=== Film ===
- Rainbow Brite and the Star Stealer (1985), character designer
- The Powerpuff Girls Movie (2002), screenwriter, story artist
- Sky High (2005), illustrator
- Cloudy with a Chance of Meatballs (2009), visual development artist

=== Television ===
- 2 Stupid Dogs (1993–1995), writer, art director, story artist, animator
- Secret Squirrel (1993)
- Dexter's Laboratory (1996–2003), character designer and art director
- The Powerpuff Girls (1998–2005), character designer and art director
- Samurai Jack (2001–2004, 2017), character designer and art director
- Star Wars: Clone Wars (2003–2005), art director
- Korgoth of Barbaria (2006)
- The Cartoonstitute (2009), creator and director of 3 Dog Band: Get It Together
- Sym-Bionic Titan (2010–2011), co-creator and character designer
- My Little Pony: Friendship Is Magic (2010–2011), first and second season opener, development artist
- Mickey Mouse (2013–2019), creator, developer, director, writer, animation department, and voice actor
- The Wonderful World of Mickey Mouse (2020–2023), creator, developer, director, writer, and voice actor

== Awards ==
Rudish has received a number of Emmy and Annie award nominations, winning three Emmys and one Annie. He shared Emmy wins for Outstanding Animated Program (For Programming One Hour or More) in 2004 and '05 for Star Wars: Clone Wars miniseries with that show's production staff, also earning nominations for Dexter's Laboratory and Samurai Jack. In 2013 he won for Outstanding Short-Format Animated Program for the Mickey Mouse episode "Croissant de Triomphe".

In 1997, Rudish shared an Individual Achievement: Writing in a TV Production Annie with Jason Butler Rote for the Dexter's Laboratory episode "The Beard to Be Feared". He also received Annie nominations in 1994 for Best Individual Achievement for Artistic Excellence in the Field of Animation for an episode of 2 Stupid Dogs and in 2003 for Outstanding Character Design in an Animated Television Production for The Powerpuff Girls episode "Members Only".

Date	Award	Category	Work	Shared with	Result
1994	Annie Awards	Best Individual Achievement for Artistic Excellence in the Field of Animation	2 Stupid Dogs	—N/a	Nominated
1996	Primetime Emmy Awards	Outstanding Animated Program (For Programming One Hour or Less)	Dexter's Laboratory (for "The Big Sister")	Larry Huber, Genndy Tartakovsky, and Craig McCracken	Nominated
1997	Annie Awards	Best Individual Achievement: Writing in a TV Production	Dexter's Laboratory (for "Beard to Be Feared")	Jason Butler Rote	Won
2002	Primetime Emmy Awards	Outstanding Animated Program (For Programming One Hour or More)	Samurai Jack (for "The Beginning")	Yumun Jeong, Yeol Jung Chang, Bong Koh Jae, Brian A. Miller, and Genndy Tartakovsky	Nominated
2003	Annie Awards	Outstanding Character Design in an Animated Television Production	The Powerpuff Girls (for "Members Only")	—N/a	Nominated
2004	Primetime Emmy Awards	Outstanding Animated Program (For Programming One Hour or More)	Star Wars: Clone Wars (for "Vol. 1 (Chapters 1–20)"	Brian A. Miller, Claudia Katz, Genndy Tartakovsky, Geraldine Symon, Jennifer Pelphrey, Bryan Andrews, Mark Andrews, Darrick Bachman, Scott Vanzo, Yumun Jeong, and Robert Alvarez	Won
2005	Primetime Emmy Awards	Outstanding Animated Program (For Programming One Hour or More)	Star Wars: Clone Wars (for "Vol. 2 (Chapters 21–25)")	Claudia Katz, Brian A. Miller, Jennifer Pelphrey, Shareena Carlson, Geraldine Symon, Genndy Tartakovsky, Bryan Andrews, Darrick Bachman, Yumun Jeong, Dong Soo Lee, Johng Ho Kim, Scott Vanzo, Robert Alvarez, Randy Myers	Won
2013	Primetime Emmy Awards	Outstanding Short-Format Animated Program	Mickey Mouse (for "Croissant de Triomphe")	—N/a	Won
2014	Primetime Emmy Awards	Outstanding Short-Format Animated Program	Mickey Mouse (for "'O Sole Minnie")	Graham MacDonald, Aaron Springer, Alonso Ramirez Ramos, Clayton Morrow, and Derek Dressler	Won
2014	Annie Awards	Outstanding Achievement in Character Design in an Animated TV/Broadcast Production	Mickey Mouse	—N/a	Won
2015	Primetime Emmy Awards	Outstanding Short-Format Animated Program	Mickey Mouse (for "Mumbai Madness")	Alonso Ramirez Ramos, Darrick Bachman, Graham MacDonald	Nominated
2017	Primetime Emmy Awards	Outstanding Short-Format Animated Program	Mickey Mouse (for "Split Decisions")	Dave Wasson, Darrick Bachman, and Graham MacDonald	Nominated
2017	Primetime Emmy Awards	Outstanding Original Music and Lyrics	Mickey Mouse (for song "Jing-A-Ling-A-Ling" from "Duck the Halls: A Mickey Mouse Christmas Special")	Christopher Willis and Darrick Bachman	Nominated
2017	Orpheus Awards	Best Short Film - Van Vlahakis Award	Mickey Mouse (for "Eau du Minnie")	Aliki Theofilopoulos	Nominated
2019	Daytime Emmy Awards	Outstanding Children's Animated Series	Mickey Mouse	Todd Popp	Nominated
