= Disney.com =

Official website of The Walt Disney Company

disney.com
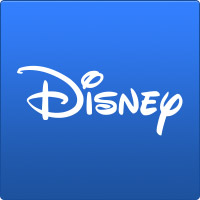
- Website type: Entertainment
- Available in: English
- Owner: The Walt Disney Company
- Website: disney.com
- Commercial: Yes
- Registration: None
- Launched: February 12, 1996; 30 years ago
- Current status: Active

disney.com is the official website of the Walt Disney Company operated by its Disney Interactive division that promotes various Disney properties such as films, television shows and theme park resorts, and offers entertainment content intended for children and families. The website is also the hub of the company's single sign-on system allowing access to various online Disney properties, similar to the company's defunct Go Network of the late 1990s and early 2000s.

For years, disney.com has been a very popular website: a survey back in April 1998 revealed that Disney.com had over 10% more unique visitors than ABCNews.com, and the combined Disney/Infoseek websites were second in web traffic to leader Yahoo! that month.

On September 21, 2011, the content from disney.com was launched as a free channel available through the Roku streaming player. It is the first player so far to allow viewing through a television.

== History ==
disney.com was first registered on March 21, 1990. On February 12, 1996, a ten-day preview of disney.com is launched through America Online and Netscape.

In January 2007, Disney CEO Bob Iger announced a major overhaul of Disney.com at the Consumer Electronics Show. The announced changes put a heavy emphasis on an integrated video player. Further changes were also announced to sort content based on visitor demographics and the addition of social networking features that would be monitored for appropriate content.

The newly redesigned website was unveiled in February 2007. It included a new service called Disney Xtreme Digital (Disney XD for short, not to be confused with the channel of the same name), which allowed members to communicate and interact with each other in chat rooms. Users were limited to select phrases and the ability to create their own Disney XD page, which were called channels. Disney XD allowed users to watch full-length episodes from Disney Channel and other videos, play online quizzes and games, stream Radio Disney and preview new movies and music albums. It included a further feature called Shop DXD. Shop DXD used an internal currency called D-Points that users could earn from playing games and activities on the website. D-Points could be used to purchase items such as backgrounds and phrases for a user's channel or chat rooms. The service was only available in the United States and the United Kingdom.

The Disney XD initiative was later de-emphasized and split into My Pages for pages and Homeroom for TV episodes. The Disney XD name was later recycled by the Disney-ABC Television Group, another division of The Walt Disney Company to launch Disney XD, an unrelated television network launched on February 13, 2009, as the successor to Toon Disney. They later added Disney Create to the website, an art gallery where users can draw and publish their art. Disney Create closed on May 1, 2014.
