= Walt Disney – A Magical Life =

Disneyland Park exhibit

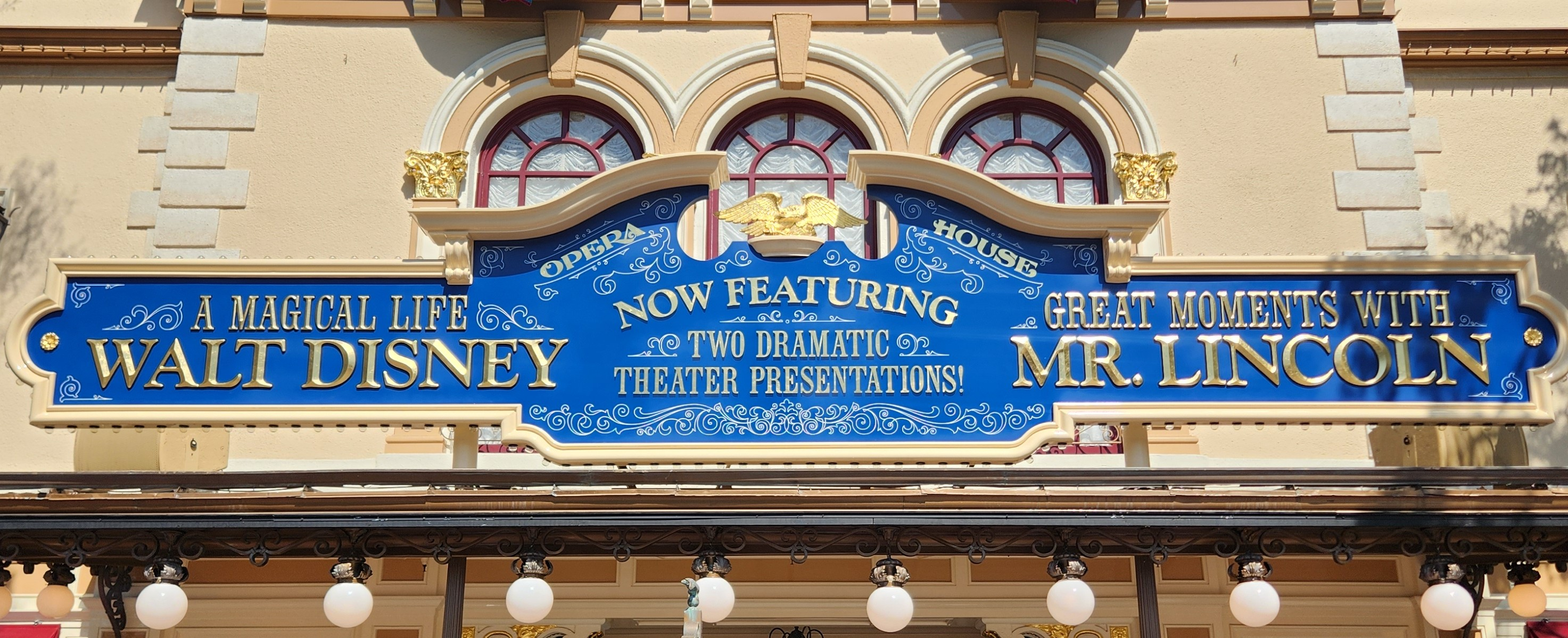

Disneyland
- Area: Main Street, USA
- Status: Operating
- Opening date: July 17, 2025

Ride statistics
- Attraction type: Exhibit and theater attraction
- Designer: Walt Disney Imagineering
- Theme: The life of Walt Disney
- Duration: 17 minutes
- Wheelchair accessible
- Assistive listening available
- Closed captioning available

Walt Disney – A Magical Life is an exhibit and stage show attraction opening in Disneyland Park. In 2026, it began playing in rotation with Great Moments with Mr. Lincoln. The attraction is a tribute to Walt Disney, co-founder of the Walt Disney Company and creator of Disneyland, and culminates in a 17-minute stage presentation featuring an Audio-Animatronics figure of Disney. The attraction opened on July 17, 2025, the 70th anniversary of the opening of Disneyland, as part of the 70th anniversary celebration of the Disneyland Resort.

== Background ==
The Opera House, located in the Main Street, U.S.A. section of Disneyland, had hosted the Great Moments with Mr. Lincoln attraction since 1965. In 1973, the show closed to make way for The Walt Disney Story—an attraction completely dedicated to Walt Disney.

Lincoln returned to the Opera House by popular demand in 1975 and the two attractions were combined into one experience: The Walt Disney Story Featuring Great Moments with Mr. Lincoln. That version existed, with updates and exhibit changes, until 2005. Lincoln returned again in 2009, but without the Walt Disney preshow. The lobby exhibit was instead dedicated to Disneyland itself.

According to Walt Disney Imagineering senior creative executive Tom Fitzgerald, Disney's Imagineers had been working on the Walt Disney—A Magical Life project for more than seven years prior to its opening. Though the idea of creating an Audio-Animatronic of Walt Disney had been an idea under consideration by Imagineering for decades before. However, Joanna Miller, Walt Disney's granddaughter, claimed that her mother, Diane Disney Miller, disapproved of the idea and continuously put pressure on the company not to consider the project.

The Disneyland Story Presenting Great Moments with Mr. Lincoln closed on April 16, 2024, with Disney officials stating that the attraction was getting a $5 million refurbishment. At D23 – The Ultimate Disney Fan Event that August, Disney Experiences chairman Josh D'Amaro announced that the attraction will be replaced by Walt Disney – A Magical Life for the park's 70th anniversary celebration. Disney also stated that after the new attraction's first year of operation, Great Moments with Mr. Lincoln would return and be presented in rotation with the Walt Disney stage presentation.

In December 2024, it was announced that the attraction would open on May 16, 2025. However, in February 2025, the opening date was delayed to July 17, the 70th anniversary of the opening of Disneyland.

Controversy surrounding the use of an Audio-Animatronic version of Walt Disney emerged in the wake of the announcement. Disney executives assured the public that the project was being handled delicately and that members of Disney's family were being consulted. Roy P. Disney, grandson of company co-founder and brother of Walt, Roy O. Disney, publicly endorsed the project at the D23 announcement. Walt Disney's grandson, Christopher Miller, also endorsed the attraction, saying in a statement that the company was "very eager to be as accurate as possible in creating this. We came away confident that this is the right group to take on this important project." Tamara Miller, another Disney grandchild, also released a positive statement, saying that her grandfather "would have been enthusiastic about the project and fascinated by the advancements of the Audio-Animatronics technology that was first developed during his days at WED (now Imagineering)."

However, Joanna Miller disagreed with her siblings and released a disapproving statement on Facebook. She called the figure an "impostor" and felt her grandfather was "being used, victimized by the company."

== Attraction ==
The exhibit space inside the Disneyland Opera House lobby is dedicated to Walt Disney's life and career. It features authentic artifacts on loan from the Walt Disney Archives and The Walt Disney Family Museum.

The theater portion begins with a recut version of the Walt Disney biographical short film One Man's Dream, which has been presented at the Walt Disney Presents attraction at Disney's Hollywood Studios at the Walt Disney World Resort since 2001.

The film then transitions to the Audio-Animatronic figure of Walt Disney on the stage in a set resembling Disney's office at the Walt Disney Studios in Burbank, California. The timeframe chosen for the figure was 1963. The Disney figure's remarks are taken from archival audio, which was restored and rebalanced so that the audio quality remains consistent.

Throughout the attraction's first year of operation, the Walt Disney stage presentation was the only show presented on the opera house stage. However, following that first year, both Great Moments with Mr. Lincoln and the Disney show rotate throughout the park's operating day. Both versions of the stage show are on a turntable so that the shows can be switched out easily.
