= Great Moments with Mr. Lincoln =

Stage show at Disneyland

Coordinates: 33.8103°N 117.9184°W

- Original Poster, 1965

Disneyland
- Area: Main Street, U.S.A.
- Status: Operating
- Opening date: July 18, 1965

1964 New York World's Fair
- Status: Closed
- Opening date: April 22, 1964
- Closing date: October 17, 1965

Ride statistics
- Attraction type: Multimedia/Audio-Animatronics show
- Designer: Walt Disney Imagineering
- Model: Theater presentation
- Theme: Abraham Lincoln
- Audience capacity: 500 per show
- Duration: ~15:00
- Wheelchair accessible
- Assistive listening available
- Closed captioning available

Great Moments with Mr. Lincoln is a stage show featuring an Audio-Animatronic representation of U.S. president Abraham Lincoln. Originally created by Walt Disney for the State of Illinois pavilion at the 1964 New York World's Fair, the show opened at Disneyland Park in 1965. Great Moments with Mr. Lincoln has undergone several changes with advances in Audio-Animatronics technology and has been on a few hiatuses over the decades.

Until April 2024, Great Moments with Mr. Lincoln was an element of the Disneyland attraction The Disneyland Story Presenting Great Moments with Mr. Lincoln, which opened in December 2009. The attraction reopened on July 17, 2025 as Walt Disney—A Magical Life, a new show featuring an Audio-Animatronic figure of Walt Disney. After the initial run of Walt Disney—A Magical Life, Great Moments with Mr. Lincoln plays in rotation with it.

== Background ==
Walt Disney had a lifelong fascination with Abraham Lincoln. On Lincoln's Birthday when he was a boy in Chicago, Disney dressed up as Lincoln in a makeshift costume and recited the Gettysburg Address to all the classes in his elementary school.

In 1957, as Disneyland became more successful, Walt Disney proposed an expansion of the park's Main Street, U.S.A. that celebrated America's colonial era. Called Liberty Street, it would have been a representation of Colonial Boston on the eve of the American Revolution (which coincided with Disney's film adaptation of Johnny Tremain). One of the centerpiece attractions would have been "The Hall of the Presidents of the United States"—a stage show featuring an immersive film presentation and lifelike figures of every U.S. president.

The Liberty Street concept for Disneyland was eventually abandoned, but work continued on the "Hall of Presidents" concept for many years (a similar area using many of the concepts from Liberty Street would eventually open as Liberty Square at Magic Kingdom Park in 1971). Disney asked director James Algar to work on the show concept and story. Algar would eventually become the show's lead director and producer.

Although the presidents were originally conceived as wax figures, Disney now became more ambitious and wanted the president figures to move and talk. But technical limitations of the time made it impossible without a huge amount of funding for research and development. Disney, Algar, and the rest of the team prepared an extensive presentation to entice corporate sponsors to back the project.

== New York World's Fair ==
=== History ===
In 1961, Walt Disney saw potential in having the "Hall of Presidents" as a centerpiece attraction in a pavilion at the 1964 New York World's Fair and retitled the concept "One Nation Under God." However, every corporation he and his team pitched the show to turned them down—either for financial or content reasons (companies thought the show did not convey their own message).

Disney thought the team needed a tangible example of the potential of the show and asked his Imagineers to work on a mock-up figure of one president. They concentrated their efforts on Disney's favorite: Abraham Lincoln. The Lincoln figure's face was created by Disney animator turned sculptor Blaine Gibson using a copy of a life mask of Lincoln made by Leonard Volk in Chicago in 1860. By the summer of 1961, the figure had been developed enough to stand from a sitting position.

In April 1962, Robert Moses, president of the 1964 New York World's Fair Corporation, visited the Walt Disney Studio to see how Disney's two (at the time) fair projects were coming along. Moses saw the Lincoln mock-up, and the Imagineers got the figure to stand and extend its hand to Moses. Astonished at the possibilities, Moses told Disney that he had to have the presidents show at the fair. Despite knowing that the figure was years from completion, Disney told Moses it would be ready—but only with Lincoln.

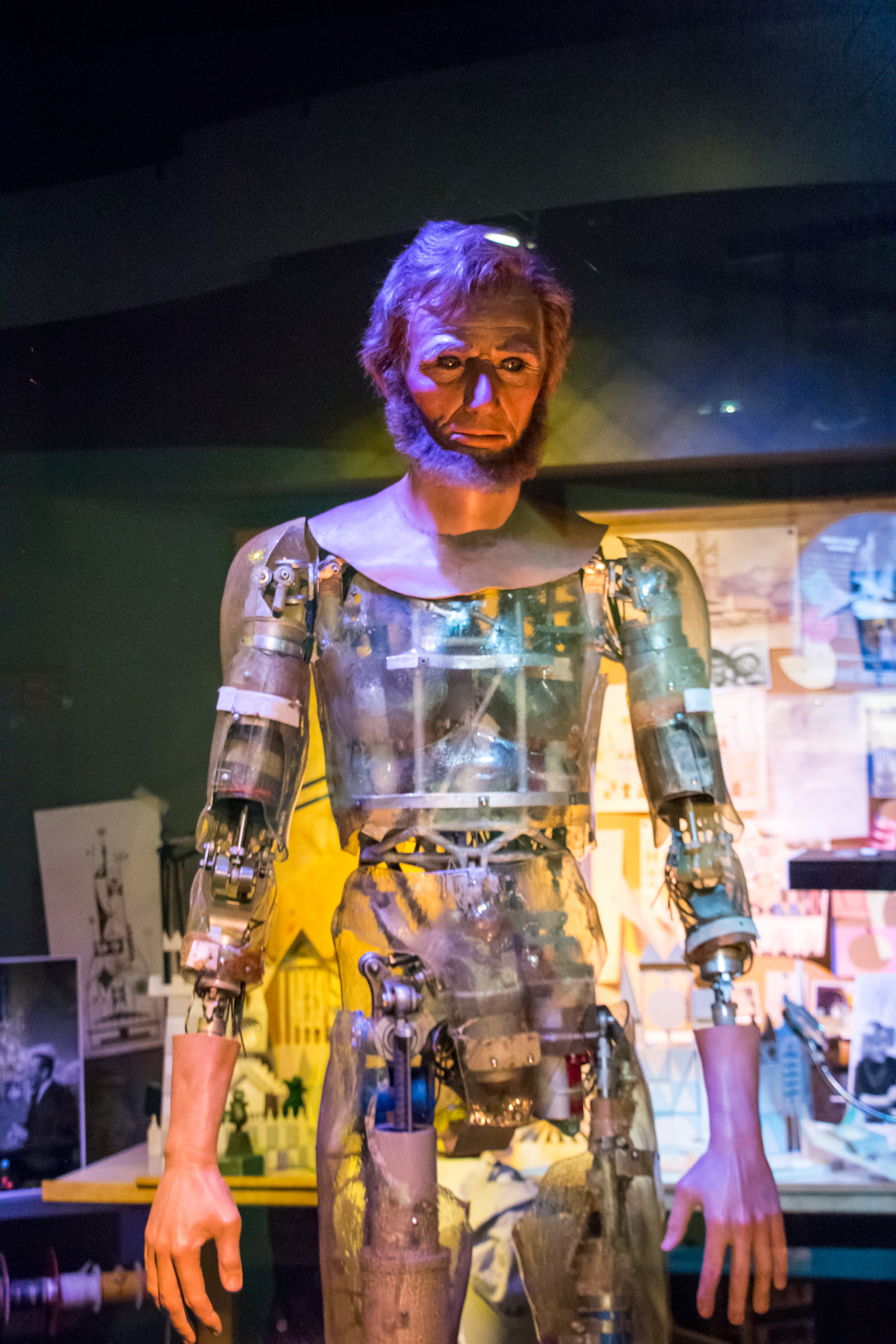
The original Lincoln Audio-Animatronic, as seen in Walt Disney Presents in Disney's Hollywood Studios.

Moses brokered a deal with Disney and the state of Illinois, who came into the fair late, to host Lincoln figure. On November 19, 1963, the 100th anniversary of Lincoln delivering his Gettysburg Address, Illinois legislators, along with Moses and Disney, announced that they would make the figure the focus of their pavilion.

With funding secured, work on the figure was fast-tracked and James Algar led the team developing the show. Other Imagineers involved included Bob Gurr, Roger Broggie, Sam McKim, and Marc Davis. Actor Royal Dano was hired personally by Walt Disney to voice Lincoln. Disney had seen Dano in an episode of the anthology TV series Omnibus playing Lincoln and noted the actor's resemblance to the 16th president. Voiceover veteran Paul Frees provided narration and other incidental voices. Disney composer Norman "Buddy" Baker created the show's score.

In the lead-up to the show's opening, members of the press, as well as Lincoln scholars and historians, were trepidatious about the idea. Others were openly hostile—mocking the project as the "winkin', blinkin' Lincoln." Making things worse was the failed press preview of the show on April 20, 1964. The Lincoln figure refused to cooperate despite the continuous efforts of the Imagineers and Disney cancelled the preview show himself.

Despite the setbacks, Great Moments with Mr. Lincoln opened on April 22, 1964, with the State of Illinois pavilion. After watching the show, the press' perception turned completely around, with many praising the show as an outstanding tribute to Lincoln. A reporter from the New York Herald Tribune said, "'Great Moments with Mr. Lincoln' was an instant success. What was re-created was a man, real to all outward appearances."

The show was a hit with fairgoers as well. 2.5 million visitors watched the show in the first season alone. Because of its lifelike movements, some members of the audience even believed that the Lincoln figure was an actor.

The attraction closed at the end of the fair's first season on October 18, 1964, and reopened for the second and final season from April 21, 1965, to October 17, 1965. At the end of the fair, the State of Illinois pavilion was completely demolished, along with most of the World's Fair buildings.

=== World's Fair presentation ===
==== Exterior ====
"As I would not be a slave, so I would not be a master. This expresses my idea of democracy. Whatever differs from this, to the extent of the difference, is no democracy."

"Our defense is in the preservation of the spirit which prizes liberty as the heritage of all men in all lands, everywhere." — Lincoln quotes on the exterior of the Illinois pavilion

The 35,000-square-foot curvilinear pavilion (designed by architectural firm SOM) was covered in 252,000 red/brown bricks made in Danville, Illinois. The exterior walls had two quotes from Lincoln in metallic lettering, along with a large portrait of the president and a relief sculpt of the state itself.

Standing outside the entrance was a new statue of a young Lincoln on horseback created by Anna Hyatt Huntington, along with the a copy of the Gutzon Borglum bust of Lincoln on display at the Lincoln Tomb in Springfield (complete with "shiny nose").

==== Pre-show ====
Once inside the pavilion, guests entered the Lincoln exhibit, featuring Lincoln-related artifacts and documents from public and private collections all over the world. Every known photograph of Lincoln was also on display. The centerpiece was the Edward Everett copy of the Gettysburg Address, handwritten by Lincoln, which is owned by the state of Illinois. The manuscript was in its own special alcove and under the guard of Illinois State Troopers.

A film presentation played before the theater doors opened to the main show. Presented on a panoramic screen, the film was a brief introduction to Illinois, a short biography of Lincoln's life, and an explanation of Lincoln's connection to the state.

==== Lincoln Theater ====
Guests then entered the 500-seat Lincoln Theater for the main show. After a brief film presentation about the origins of the United States and Lincoln's connection to the country's legacy, the screen disappeared and the curtains opened to reveal the Audio-Animatronic figure of Abraham Lincoln sitting in a chair, flanked by the flags of the United States and Illinois.

The figure then stood up and gave an address consisting of excerpts from speeches Lincoln gave before and during his presidency. Lincoln's speech touched upon the nature of liberty, how the love of liberty sustains the United States, and the duty Americans have to preserve the spirit of liberty for themselves and subsequent generations.

The show concluded with the curtains at the back of the stage opening to reveal the rotunda of the United States Capitol building and a star-filled sky. Toward the end of Lincoln's speech, the night sky gradually turned into a sunrise effect. Lincoln then sat back down and the sunrise created an abstract image of the American flag in the sky background. A choral rendition of "The Battle Hymn of the Republic" accompanied the finale using a unique surround sound effect to simulate a choir procession gradually filling the auditorium.

==== Post-show ====
After the show, visitors moved into the Illinois Exhibit Hall, showcasing the state's modern amenities and industry in a series of displays. Also in the post show was a historical reference library, featuring a collection of books and research materials on Illinois and Lincoln. Visitors then made their way out of the building to the special exhibits garden area, which included a replica of the Lincoln-Berry General Store in New Salem, Illinois, as well as a tourist information desk.

== Disneyland ==
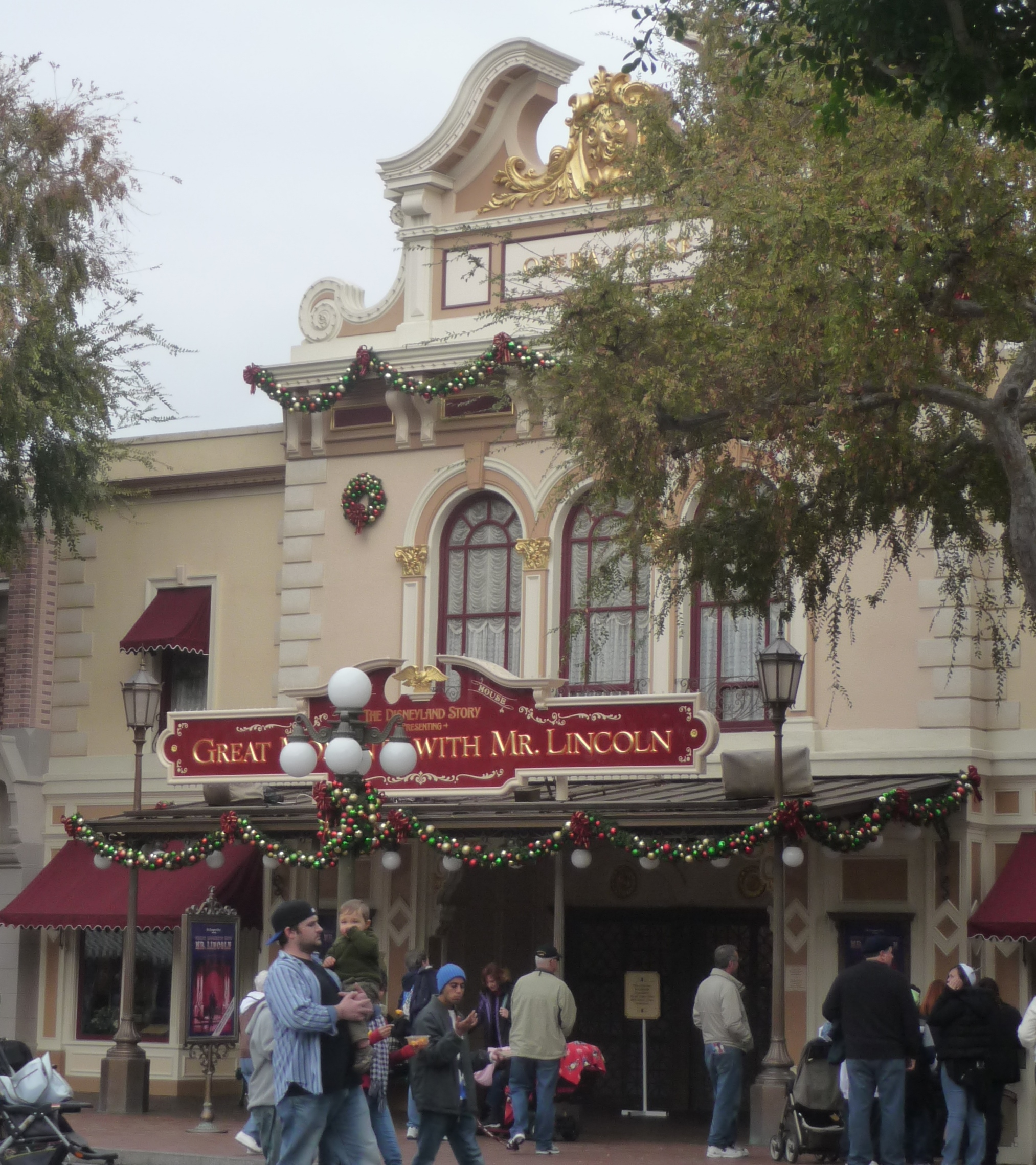
Entrance to Great Moments with Mr. Lincoln during the 2009 holiday season

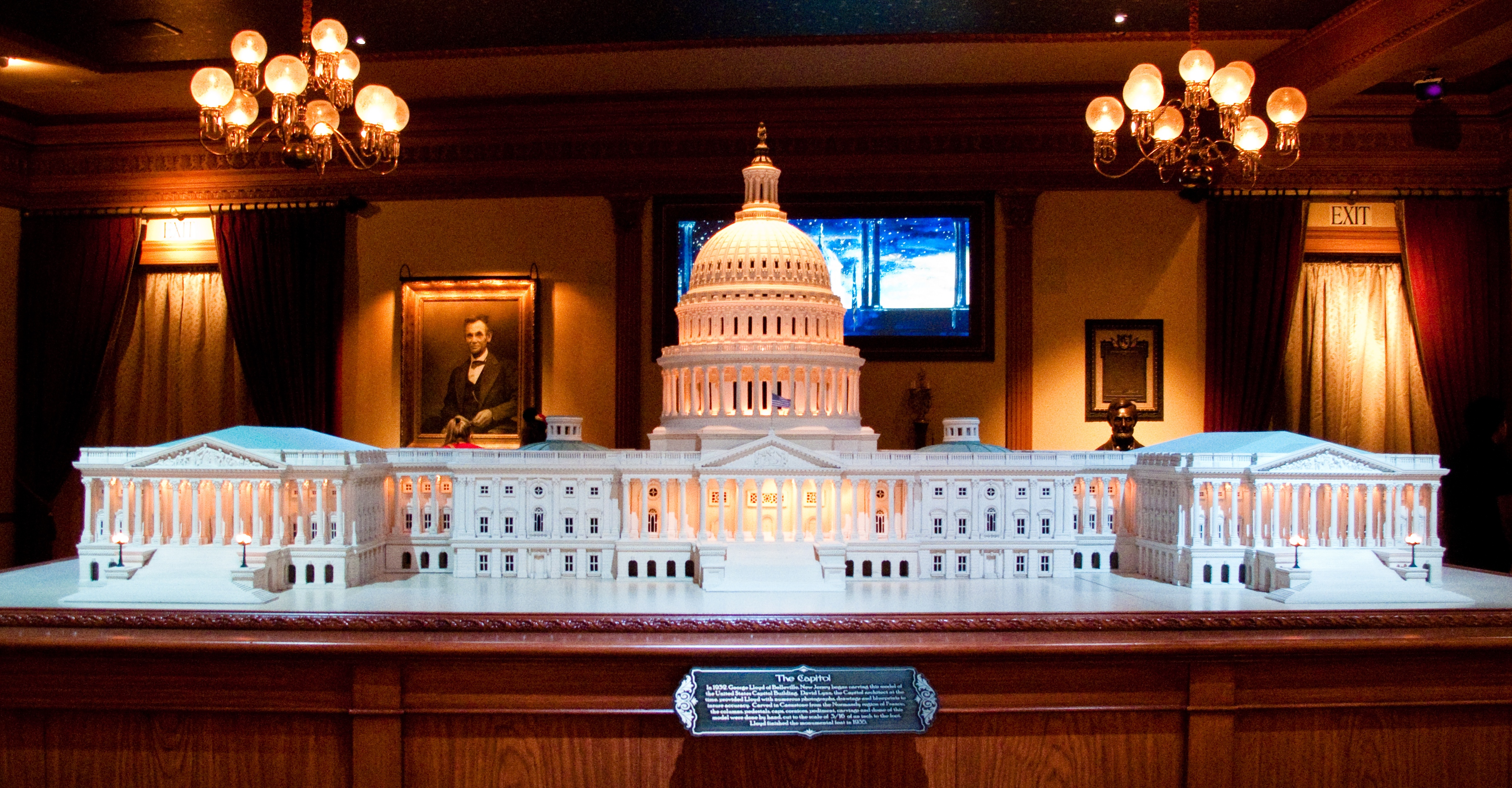
The limestone model of the United States Capitol, created by George Lloyd, displayed in the pre-show lobby of Great Moments with Mr. Lincoln.

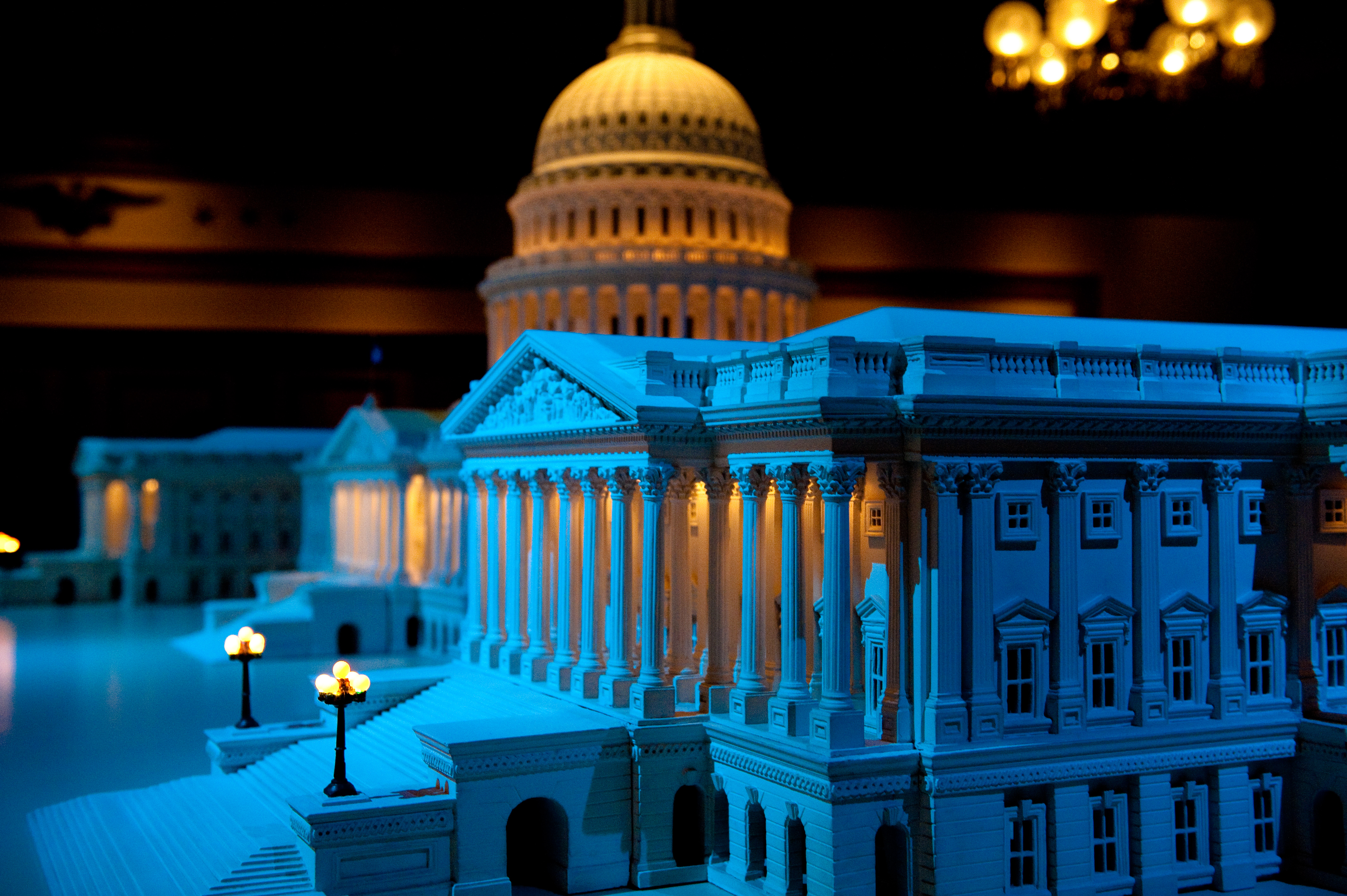
Close-up view of the model of the United States Capitol

=== Original version (1965–1973) ===
The first Disneyland version of Great Moments with Mr. Lincoln opened on July 18, 1965, as part of the 10th anniversary celebration ("Tencennial") of the park, in the Opera House on Main Street, U.S.A. When it opened, Great Moments with Mr. Lincoln required an "E" coupon for adult admission (guests had to pay for each attraction at the time). It was eventually downgraded to a "D" coupon. However, a free child's ticket was included with every child ticket book.

The original attraction in New York was still operating for three months after the Disneyland version opened—marking the first time a Disney attraction performed simultaneously in two different locations.

The state of Illinois did not continue the attraction's sponsorship over to Disneyland. The Lincoln Savings and Loan Association agreed to sponsor the attraction beginning in 1966.

==== Pre-show ====
Like the Illinois pavilion, the pre-show in the Opera House was devoted entirely to Lincoln. Guests were greeted at the entrance lobby by a 16-foot-long limestone model of the U.S. Capitol, created by sculptor George Lloyd in 1935. Walt Disney purchased the model from Lloyd in 1955 for display at Disneyland.

The second portion of the pre-show was a new short film called "The Lincoln Story," which was presented on a 28-foot-long screen. Using many of the elements from the World's Fair pre-show film, this new film eliminated all the references to Illinois.

==== Theater presentation ====
The show in the main theater was a duplicate of the World's Fair presentation, even in a theater with the same capacity as the New York version. Lincoln, however, was a more advanced Audio-Animatronic figure than the one performing in New York—with 48 different body movements and 17 head movements and facial cues.

The original New York figure is currently on display in the Walt Disney Presents attraction at Disney's Hollywood Studios at the Walt Disney World Resort.

=== The Walt Disney Story (1973–1975) ===
Great Moments with Mr. Lincoln closed on January 1, 1973, to make room for a new attraction devoted entirely to Walt Disney. The Walt Disney Story opened on April 8, 1973. A similar version of this attraction also appeared at the Magic Kingdom from April 15, 1973, until October 5, 1992. It was a free attraction for everyone, courtesy of the show's new sponsor, the Gulf Oil Company.

==== Pre-show ====
The Opera House lobby became an exhibit space entirely dedicated to the life and career of Walt Disney. Display cabinets exhibited many of Disney's awards and commendations. An alcove housed a presentation about Disney's connection to animals and nature through his True-Life Adventure film series, hosted by an Audio-Animatronic owl.

The centerpiece of the lobby display was a re-creation of Disney's offices at the Walt Disney Studio in Burbank, California. The contents of the office display (down to the furniture and the drapes) were all authentic—catalogued and collected by Dave Smith of the then relatively new Walt Disney Archives.

==== Theater presentation ====
Instead of an Audio-Animatronic presentation, guests were treated to a 28-minute film presentation in the main theater about the life of Walt Disney. Using a panoramic screen with film clips and vintage photographs, the film was narrated by Disney via archival audio from many sources.

=== The Walt Disney Story Featuring Great Moments with Mr. Lincoln (1975–2001) ===
The Walt Disney Story received public criticism. At the time, Orange County, California (where Disneyland is located) was a heavily Republican-leaning county, and local residents were upset with the removal of the Lincoln show, as Lincoln was a Republican. The attraction closed on February 12, 1975 (Lincoln's birthday) and reopened on June 12, 1975, as The Walt Disney Story Featuring Great Moments with Mr. Lincoln. Gulf continued to sponsor the new attraction.

The attraction underwent a significant refurbishment in 1984, which impacted both the pre-show and theater show.

==== Pre-show ====
When the attraction reopened in 1975, the pre-show changed very little from The Walt Disney Story. Most of the displays were still about Walt Disney—including the studio office reproductions. In 1984, the rear lobby area was dedicated entirely to Lincoln with vintage Lincoln photographs and displays. The George Lloyd sculpture of the U.S. Capitol returned to the pre-show lobby in 1985. A new pre-show film, narrated by Pete Renaday, was also produced to better connect the Walt Disney and Lincoln portions of the attraction.

==== Theater presentation ====
Initially, guests in the Opera House theater watched an edited version of The Walt Disney Story film, culminating in the Great Moments with Mr. Lincoln stage show. While the figure still used the voice of Royal Dano, the speech included several passages of Dano's Lincoln recording for The Hall of Presidents.

During the 1984 refurbishment, Walt Disney Imagineering consulted with scientists from the Center for Biomedical Design at the University of Utah. Those scientists were pioneering advanced artificial limbs and the Imagineers collaborated with them on new technology for Audio-Animatronic figures, creating more lifelike movement. A new Lincoln figure was the first to receive the technological upgrade, which included new skin and a new costume.

In addition to the new figure, the theater show itself was updated and augmented. The Walt Disney Story film was eliminated—portions were now used in the new pre-show film in the attraction's lobby. The slideshow half of the theater show was extended to include a new sequence: an adaptation of the "Two Brothers" segment of The American Adventure at EPCOT. The original World's Fair speech was reinstated, but it was edited to remove two paragraphs. "The Battle Hymn of the Republic" was switched out for a new underscore that included "Golden Dream"—another import from The American Adventure. And instead of a sunset creating an abstract American flag, the sky formed an abstract bald eagle.

==== Post-show ====
In 1976, a 53-foot-long mural was commissioned by Gulf Oil and installed in the exit lobby of Great Moments with Mr. Lincoln. Called the "Fifth Freedom Mural," the piece was created by Imagineering artist Eddie Martinez and celebrated America's "fifth freedom" of free enterprise (the others being President Franklin Roosevelt's "four freedoms": freedom of worship, freedom of speech, freedom from want, freedom from fear). Famous examples of enterprising Americans were depicted in the mural, including Robert Goddard, the Wright brothers, Pearl Buck, Henry Ford, and Walt Disney.

==== Muppets controversy ====
In the summer of 1990, Disneyland employees were informed that The Walt Disney Story Featuring Great Moments with Mr. Lincoln would be closing that August. Rumors circulated that the Lincoln show would be replaced by a west coast edition of the Muppet*Vision 3D attraction, which was opening at the Disney-MGM Studios Theme Park (now Disney's Hollywood Studios) the following May.

As with the closure in 1973, a significant amount of public outcry saved the attraction. The Los Angeles Times quoted Disneyland spokesperson Paul Goldman: "If you’d asked a few days ago I’d have said that being a 25-year-old attraction, its popularity has passed. But there seems to be a lot of sentiment for Lincoln."

Muppet*Vision 3D eventually found a home on the west coast as an opening day attraction at Disney California Adventure Park in February 2001. This version of the attraction closed in 2014.

=== The Walt Disney Story Featuring Great Moments with Mr. Lincoln—"The Journey to Gettysburg" (2001–2005) ===
The Walt Disney Story Featuring Great Moments with Mr. Lincoln closed in early 2001 for a 21st-century update. It reopened on July 17, 2001, as being the fourth renovations, with a new subtitle: "The Journey to Gettysburg." This was the most extensive reimagining of the attraction in its history—with the original show completely jettisoned. Rather than approaching the Lincoln show as the culmination of a tribute to Walt Disney and his creativity, the Imagineers reimagined Great Moments with Mr. Lincoln as an immersive experience around the American Civil War, utilizing binaural audio headphones. The update was made so the Lincoln show would be more engaging and relevant to modern audiences. The attraction also received a new score from composer Joel McNeely.

==== Pre-show ====
The entrance lobby still retained the displays about Walt Disney's life from previous lobby incarnations, with many refreshed. The True-Life Adventure alcove was reconfigured with a new video display playing a montage of excerpts from the 2001 documentary, Walt: The Man Behind the Myth. The new video also provided narrative connection to the Lincoln show by ending the montage with a clip from the Walt Disney's Wonderful World of Color episode, "Disneyland Goes to the World's Fair."

As guests entered the real lobby area, they were given a binaural headset. The rear lobby area was still exclusively about Lincoln, with displays, photographs. But the pre-show film was now the setup for the show's revised story. Civil War photographer Matthew Brady (voiced by Lane Davies) became the narrator and (through Civil War era photographs) set the stage for the historic scenario guests would imagine themselves in. Brady then assigned guests the role of a fictional Union private, John Cunningham, and told them to step into Brady's studio (the theater) for a portrait.

==== Theater presentation ====
Once seated inside the theater, the lights dimmed and guests were given a sensory storytelling experience with the binaural sound system and eventually a screen with still photos.

The guest (as Private Cunningham) met Matthew Brady in his photo studio in Washington, D.C. for a soldier's portrait, received a haircut from Brady's assistant, and followed Brady to the White House to meet President Lincoln, who had his own photo session scheduled. When Brady and Cunningham arrived, Lincoln (voiced by Warren Burton) was in the middle of talking with Frederick Douglass (voiced by J.D. Hall). During the photo session, Lincoln discovered the invitation to the dedication of Gettysburg National Cemetery and ushered everyone out of the room, wishing Private Cunningham good luck on the battlefield.

During an unnamed battle, Cunningham was wounded by cannon fire. Cunningham woke up in a military hospital and was informed by a nurse that his leg had to be amputated. Lincoln then entered the room and, recognizing Cunningham, went to him and implored the private that he must find the will to live. Brady then assured the audience that Cunningham lived and attended the Gettysburg dedication in person.

The finale of the show was the Lincoln figure on stage, but in a very different environment meant to simulate the outdoor area where Lincoln gave his address at the Gettysburg cemetery dedication. The background curtains as well as the U.S. Capitol rotunda were completely removed, replaced with a clear blue sky. The ornate chair where Lincoln sat in the original show was replaced with a small wooden chair. The small columns behind the chair were also removed and replaced with plants and flowers. The big columns from the previous versions of the show were left intact. The Lincoln figure itself was given an upgrade; its beard was lengthened to match Lincoln's age. It was also given a pair of eyeglasses, as well as a small paper in its hand.

As Lincoln gave his address, the background behind him changed from a day to dawn. When he was finished, the show closed the show was a short rendition of "The Battle Hymn of the Republic." As the music was played the background changed to form the abstract American flag. As Lincoln sat down in his chair, the sunset turned to night a painting of the Lincoln Memorial statue covered the sky.

=== Disneyland: The First 50 Magical Years (2005–2009) ===
The Walt Disney Story Featuring Great Moments with Mr. Lincoln closed on February 20, 2005, to make room for Disneyland: The First 50 Magical Years—an exhibit attraction that was part of the park's Happiest Homecoming on Earth 50th anniversary celebration. The previous show was completely changed out with displays and art about the making of Disneyland itself. The climax was a film presentation in the main theater presented by actor Steve Martin and an animated Donald Duck. The attraction opened with the 50th anniversary celebration on May 5, 2005, but lasted until March 15, 2009 (The Happiest Homecoming in Earth ended on September 30, 2006).

=== The Disneyland Story Presenting Great Moments with Mr. Lincoln (2009–2024) ===
On December 18, 2009, the Lincoln show returned once again in a new combined attraction: The Disneyland Story Presenting Great Moments with Mr. Lincoln, as being the fifth renovations. The attraction featured elements from all previous versions (except for "The Journey to Gettysburg"). For this edition, the Imagineers came back to the original World's Fair format with some new technological advancements.

==== Pre-show ====
The lobby now displayed exhibits about the making of Disneyland itself. Many of the exhibits were left over from Disneyland: The First 50 Magical Years, including the scale model of the park as it looked when it opened on July 17, 1955. The model was moved from its central location in the rear lobby to the alcove near the entrance and placed at an angle for better visibility.

The displays of Walt Disney's studio offices were completely removed—the space absorbed by the relocated Disney Gallery, which opened in October 2009 next door to the Opera House at the Bank of Main Street. In its place on the Opera House side was more wall display space as well as a widescreen television, which showed an abridged version of the Disneyland: The First 50 Magical Years film presentation. On October 18, 2023, the 50th film was replaced with the Disney 100th anniversary animated short, Once Upon a Studio.

The rear lobby area reverted to being about Lincoln. However, the new Lincoln pre-show was not so much about Lincoln the historic figure, but Lincoln's connection to Walt Disney and his Imagineers. Concept art for the show was now on display by artists like Herbert Ryman, John DeCuir, and John Pomeroy. A display case houses the maquettes for the Spirits of America sculptures that line the Liberty Theater in The American Adventure at EPCOT. The centerpiece of the room is the George Lloyd U.S. Capitol model, previously displayed as the main lobby exhibit.

The pre-show film now tells the story of the making of the attraction for the World's Fair and its connection to Walt Disney. A short clip of the Omnibus episode, "Mr. Lincoln," starring Lincoln voice actor Royal Dano, is also shown as part of the film.

On February 1, 2023, another pre-show film was added to the rear lobby in addition to the previous one. Produced in collaboration with National Geographic and narrated by Robin Roberts, the film focuses on the historic relationship between Frederick Douglass and Abraham Lincoln. It includes testimonials from Douglass’ third great-grandson Kenneth B. Morris Jr., and Dr. John Stauffer. A bust of Douglass was placed next to the bust of Lincoln in the lobby area in April 2022.

==== Theater presentation ====
For the theater show, Imagineers returned to the World's Fair format—including the look of the screen and the stage.

The theater film combined many elements from previous incarnations and other attractions. Opening with a shortened version of Lincoln's biography (again voiced by Royal Dano and narrated by Paul Frees), the film follows the 1984 version with the "Two Brothers" sequence still intact and the addition of an excerpt from the Gettysburg Address at the end. The music is a combination of Buddy Baker's original Lincoln score as well as excerpts from his score for the Disney Circle-Vision 360° film America the Beautiful.

The new Lincoln figure features the most advanced Audio-Animatronic head (at the time). Imagineers said at opening that the all-electric head actuators greatly extends Lincoln's emotive capabilities. The face was given a new sculpt by creature and special effects artist Lee Romaire. Imagineer Tony Baxter, the lead executive on the project, wanted the Lincoln face to be more attractive and heroic, so Romaire slightly altered Lincoln's appearance to make him more symmetrical but still retained some of the more unique details of his face.

The speech the figure gives is the 1984 edited version of the World's Fair speech, once again voiced by Royal Dano through archival recordings (Dano died in 1994). However, Dano's voice is from a newly discovered recording that is cleaner than the original performance. The recording also contains heavy breathing and lip smacks that were deliberately left in to make Lincoln seem more believable and human.

At the end of the show, the sky again creates an abstract American flag accompanied by the full rendition of "Battle Hymn of the Republic." Lincoln sits down and a sketch of the Lincoln Memorial statue is superimposed on the night sky as the curtains close.

==== Post-show ====
After the curtains close, the song "Golden Dreams" plays and a projected bald eagle flies from the stage curtains to the curtains above the guest exit, to encourage the audience to leave. The Fifth Freedom Mural was completely removed from the exit lobby and replaced with photos and paintings of Americans who embody the spirits of America. However, a few of those paintings are actual pieces from the old mural.

Spirit of Celebration: Richard M. Sherman, Robert B. Sherman, Michael Jackson, Elvis Presley, The Beach Boys

Spirit of Achievement: President Barack Obama, Justice Sonia Sotomayor, Bill Gates, Frank Lloyd Wright, the Wright brothers, Thomas Edison, Henry Ford

Spirit of Giving: Bob Hope, Oprah Winfrey, Jerry Lewis, Edward James Olmos

Spirit of Perseverance: President John F. Kennedy, Jackie Robinson, Kristi Yamaguchi, Bruce Lee

Spirit of Tolerance: Helen Keller, Dr. Martin Luther King Jr.

Spirit of Inspiration: Rosa Parks, Sally Ride, Amelia Earhart, Erik Weihenmayer, Alex Haley

Spirit of Imagination: Mark Twain, Lucille Ball, Jim Henson, Mary Blair, George Lucas, Norman Rockwell, Walt Disney

==== The Disney Gallery ====
In 2013, The Disney Gallery closed and became the new home of the Disneyana Shop, which itself had closed to make way for the Disneyland Starbucks location at the Market House on Main Street. The Gallery was moved into a portion of the lobby for The Disneyland Story Presenting Great Moments with Mr. Lincoln, where its exhibits rotate periodically to coincide with company promotions or highlighting attraction anniversaries.

=== Walt Disney – A Magical Life (2025–present) ===
The Disneyland Story Presenting Great Moments with Mr. Lincoln closed on April 16, 2024. At D23—The Ultimate Disney Fan Event in August 2024, Disney Experiences chairman Josh D'Amaro announced that the attraction would be replaced with Walt Disney – A Magical Life, for the park's 70th anniversary celebration. The centerpiece of the new attraction is a stage show featuring an Audio-Animatronic of Walt Disney. In December 2024, it was announced that it would open on May 16, 2025. After a year regularly presenting the Walt Disney show, that show will rotate with Great Moments with Mr. Lincoln throughout each operating day. In February 2025, it was announced that the opening date was pushed back to July 17, 2025, the date of Disneyland's 70th anniversary.

== In popular culture ==
- Ray Bradbury's 1969 short story "Downwind from Gettysburg" was inspired by Great Moments with Mr. Lincoln.
- The band Negativland used a modified version of the speech from the attraction in the song "God Bull" on their album No Business.
- In the 101 Dalmatians: The Series episode "Cruella World" the Great Moments with Cruella Devil attraction in Cruella World is a homage to Great Moments with Mr. Lincoln.
- In the Clone High episode "A Room of One's Clone: The Pie of the Storm", the teenaged clone of Abraham Lincoln seeks advice from a "robomatronic" Lincoln in a theme park attraction that also mashes in elements of Disneyland's Enchanted Tiki Room show and the Pirates of the Caribbean ride.
- The Modern Family episode "Disneyland" closes with Jay Pritchett (Ed O'Neill) and his family sitting together watching Great Moments with Mr. Lincoln, after a long day of their family trip to Disneyland.
- An August 16, 2013 the Pearls Before Swine comic strip mentioned the attraction in Rat's "Beerland" themepark. Rat's version of the attraction contained Lincoln sitting drunk at a table trying to hit on women.
- In the Mickey Mouse episode "Potatoland", Mickey and Donald build a theme park called Potatoland to fulfill Goofy's lifelong dream to visit it. One of the attractions featured was a potato-themed version of Great Moments with Mr. Lincoln with a giant potato in a stovepipe hat and beard, which is also referenced in the queue for the Disneyland version of Mickey & Minnie's Runaway Railway.
- In the Futurama episode "Insane in the Mainframe", there is a robotic Lincoln, based on Great Moments with Mr. Lincoln, in the insane asylum that has 200 split personalities that are all some form of Lincoln.

== Lincoln's speech ==
The speech the Audio-Animatronic Lincoln has given in the various incarnations of the show (with the exception of the "Journey to Gettysburg" version) is composed of excerpts from speeches Lincoln gave before and during his time in office. The hybrid speech was compiled by attraction director James Algar.

When asked why he chose not to have the Lincoln figure recite the Gettysburg Address, Walt Disney offered this explanation: "Because [the Gettysburg Address] is so familiar to every American, we felt that it would not contribute significantly to our purpose—an in-depth, fresh of Lincoln's principles, ideals, and philosophies."

The world has never had a good definition of the word liberty, and the American people, just now, are much in want of one. We all declare for liberty; but in using the same word we do not all mean the same thing.

What constitutes the bulwark of our liberty and independence? It is not our frowning embattlements, our bristling sea coasts. These are not our reliance against tyranny. Our reliance is in the love of liberty, which God has planted in our bosoms. Our defense is in the preservation of the spirit which prizes liberty as the heritage of all men, in all lands everywhere. Destroy this spirit, and you have planted the seeds of despotism around your own doors.

At what point shall we expect the approach of danger? By what means shall we fortify against it? Shall we expect some trans-Atlantic military giant to step the ocean and crush us at a blow? Never! All the armies of Europe, Asia, and Africa combined could not, by force, take a drink from the Ohio or make a track on the Blue Ridge in a trial of a thousand years. At what point, then, is the approach of danger to be expected? I answer, [that] if it ever reach us, it must spring [from] amongst us; it cannot come from abroad. If destruction be our lot, we [ourselves must] be [the] author[s] and finisher[s]. As a nation of free men, we must live through all time[s], or die by suicide.

Let reverence for the [law] be breathed by every American mother to the lisping babe that prattles on her lap; let it be taught in schools, in seminaries, and in colleges; let it be written in primers, [in] spelling-books, and almanacs; let it be preached from the pulpit, proclaimed in legislative halls, and enforced in courts of justice. And, in short, let it become the political religion of the nation; and let the old and the young, the rich and the poor, the grave and the gay of all sexes and tongues and colors and conditions, sacrifice unceasingly [at] its altars.

[And] let us strive to deserve, as far as mortals may, the continued care of Divine Providence, trusting that, in future national emergencies, He will not fail to provide us the instruments of safety and security.

Neither let us be slandered from our duty by false accusations against us, nor frightened from it by [the] menaces of destruction to the Government nor of dungeons to ourselves. Let us have faith that right makes might, and in that faith, let us, to the end, dare to do our duty as we understand it.

== Notes ==
1. Deviations in the soundtrack from Lincoln's historical speeches are indicated by [ ].
2. Paragraph was deleted in all versions performed at Disneyland after 1984.

== See also ==
- The Hall of Presidents, an Audio-Animatronics show in Magic Kingdom featuring all Presidents of the United States.

== Sources ==
- Gordon, Bruce; Mumford, David (1995). Disneyland: The Nickel Tour. Camphor Tree Publishers. ISBN 0-9646059-0-2.
- Green, Amy Boothe; Green, Howard E. (1999). Remembering Walt: Favorite Memories of Walt Disney. Hyperion Press. ISBN 0-7868-6348-X.
- Kiste, Andrew (2019). Walt Disney and the 1964-1965 New York World's Fair : great moments. New York, New York. ISBN 978-1-68390-190-7. OCLC 1107322827.
