= Walt Disney Presents (attraction) =

Gallery at Disney's Hollywood Studios

Coordinates: 28.357044°N 81.561105°W

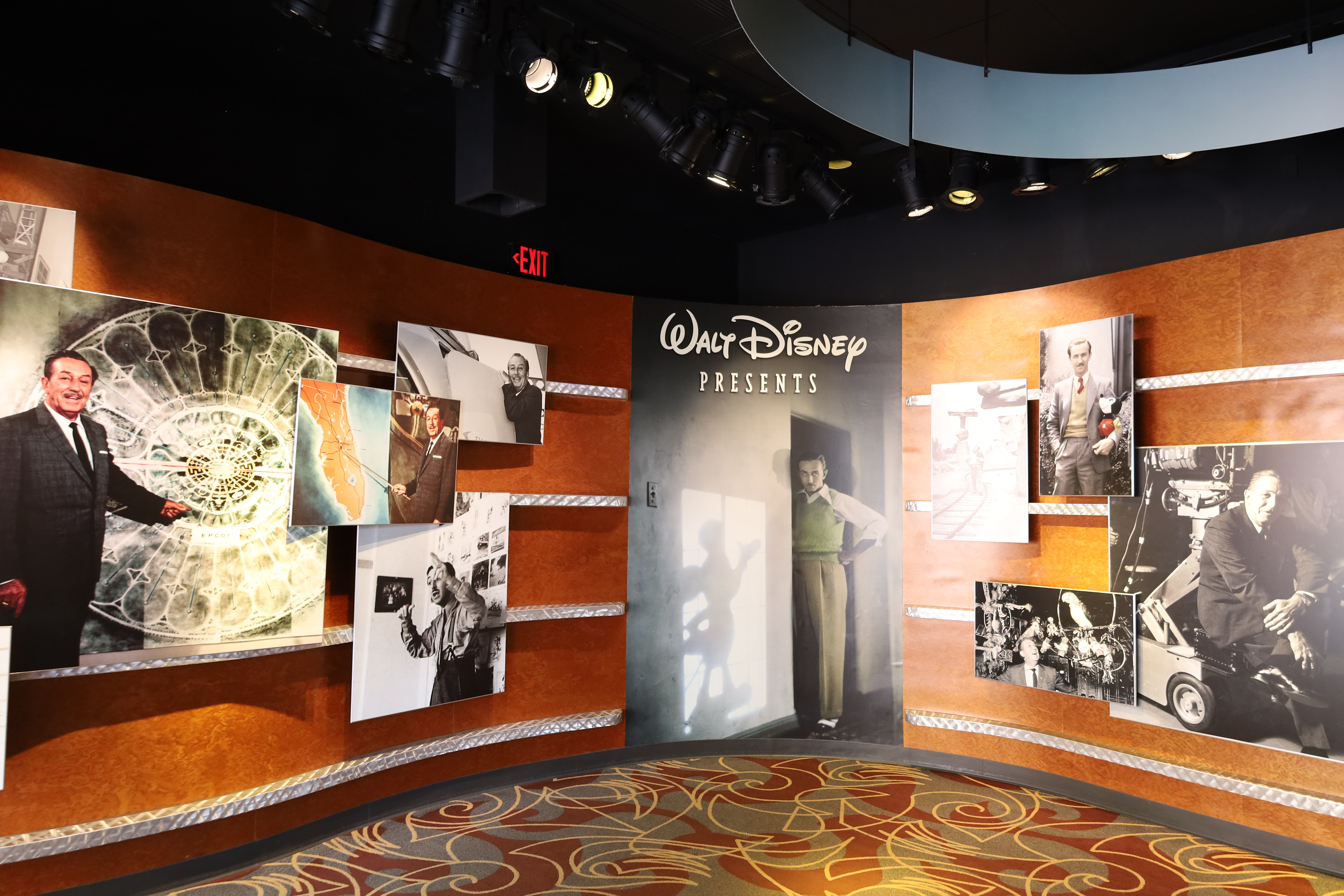
- Entrance to gallery

Disney's Hollywood Studios
- Area: Animation Courtyard (2001–2026); Walt Disney Studios (2026–present)
- Status: Operating
- Opening date: October 1, 2001

Ride statistics
- Attraction type: Interactive gallery and short film
- Designer: Walt Disney Imagineering
- Theme: Legacy of Walt Disney
- Narrator: Michael Eisner (2001–05); Julie Andrews (2005–present)
- Wheelchair accessible
- Assistive listening available
- Closed captioning available

Walt Disney Presents is an interactive gallery exhibit located in The Walt Disney Studios Lot at Disney's Hollywood Studios. The gallery opened on October 1, 2001, on the 30th anniversary of Walt Disney World and as part of the 100 Years of Magic celebration, commemorating what would have been Walt Disney's 100th birthday. The gallery features memorabilia from the Disney archives, including artifacts from Walt Disney's life and from the history of his namesake company, from his birth in 1901 through the company's vision for the future.

Inside the attraction, The Walt Disney Theater features a 15-minute short film of Walt Disney's life, titled Walt Disney: One Man's Dream, that explores the hardships he overcame, as well as previously unseen footage, including the creation of Mickey Mouse. The short film was originally narrated by Michael Eisner. Julie Andrews later became the narrator after Eisner's exit as CEO of the Walt Disney Company. The short film will occasionally be preempted, and the theater will instead showcase sneak peeks of upcoming Disney film releases.

Among the artifacts on permanent display are a model of Disneyland's Main Street, U.S.A., the 1955 Academy Award for Best Special Effects for 20,000 Leagues Under the Sea, the original Abraham Lincoln audio-animatronic from Great Moments with Mr. Lincoln and a model of The Twilight Zone Tower of Terror.

The gallery has additionally featured then-upcoming attractions to Disney's Hollywood Studios, including a full model of Toy Story Land, a model of a building for Star Wars: Galaxy's Edge and artwork for Mickey & Minnie's Runaway Railway. It currently features upcoming Disney World attractions and projects, including a full model of the Monsters, Inc.-themed suspended roller coaster and along with updated artwork for Monstropolis at Disney's Hollywood Studios, a model of the Tropical Americas land at Disney's Animal Kingdom, a model of Piston Peak National Park at Magic Kingdom's Frontierland, a model of Walt Disney's Carousel of Progress updates at Magic Kingdom's Tomorrowland, and a model of Disney's Lakeshore Lodge at Walt Disney World.

In July 2025, it was announced the attraction would become part of Mickey's Avenue in The Walt Disney Studios Lot, since Animation Courtyard was being permanently closed on September 25, 2025.
