= Welcome to Monstropolis =

Disney stage show

Disney's Hollywood Studios
- Area: Monstropolis
- Coordinates: 28.354952°N 81.559536°W
- Status: Under construction
- Replaced: Muppet*Vision 3D (Grand Avenue)

Ride statistics
- Attraction type: 3D Live show
- Designer: Walt Disney Imagineering; Pixar
- Theme: Monsters, Inc.
- Music: "Welcome to Monstropolis" written by Randy Newman (music & lyrics)
- Host: Mike and Sulley

Welcome to Monstropolis is an upcoming 3D stage show attraction at Disney's Hollywood Studios.

== History ==
"Welcome to Monstropolis" was first announced in August 2026 during the D23 fan event, as part of the previously announced Monstropolis land coming to Disney's Hollywood Studios. The attraction is scheduled to open in 2027.

== Cast ==
- Billy Crystal as Mike Wazowski
- John Goodman as James P. Sullivan
