= Monstropolis (Disney's Hollywood Studios) =

Upcoming theme park area

- Interactive map of Monstropolis
- Theme: Monsters, Inc.

Disney's Hollywood Studios
- Coordinates: 28.3551°N 81.5594°W
- Status: Under construction
- Opens: 2027
- Replaced: Grand Avenue

Monstropolis is an upcoming themed area at Disney's Hollywood Studios inspired by Pixar's Monsters, Inc. franchise. It will replace Muppet*Vision 3D and its surrounding Grand Avenue area.

== History ==
In August 2024 at the D23 fan event, it was announced that a Monsters, Inc. themed land will be built at Disney's Hollywood Studios. The land will include Disney's first suspended roller coaster. In November 2024, it was announced that Muppet*Vision 3D and the Grand Avenue area would close to make room for the land. Construction began in 2025. In October 2025, it was revealed that the land will be called Monstropolis, the same name as the fictional city in which the franchise is set. In June 2026, details and the backstory for the land were revealed.

At the D23 fan event in August 2026, an attraction called Welcome to Monstropolis was announced as well as shopping and dining locations, and it was also announced that the majority of the land is scheduled to open in 2027, while the suspended roller coaster will open at a later date.

== Future attractions ==
- Unnamed suspended roller coaster

=== Future shows ===
- Welcome to Monstropolis

=== Future restaurants ===
- Harryhausen's
- Archie's Scare Pig Pizza
- Monsters University Alumni Club (as lounge)

=== Future shops ===
- Scareporium
