= Muppet*Vision 3D =

Former 3-D film attraction at Disney's Hollywood Studios and Disney California Adventure

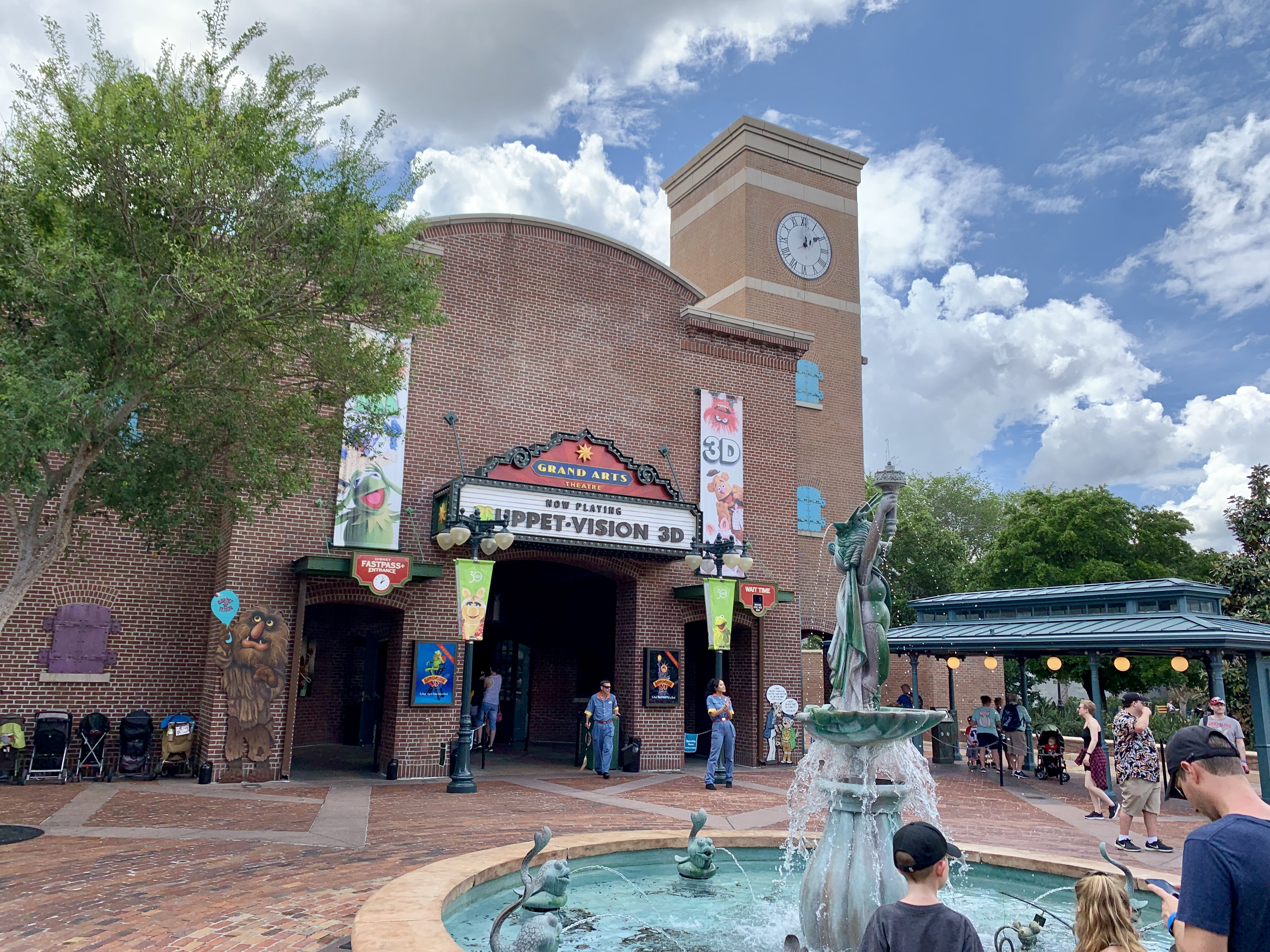
- Attraction entrance and courtyard at Disney's Hollywood Studios

Disney's Hollywood Studios
- Area: Streets of America (1991–2016); Muppets Courtyard (2016–2017); Grand Avenue (2017–2025)
- Coordinates: 28.354952°N 81.559536°W
- Status: Removed
- Opening date: May 16, 1991
- Closing date: June 8, 2025
- Replaced by: Welcome to Monstropolis (Monstropolis)

Disney California Adventure
- Area: Hollywood Land
- Coordinates: 33.8078239°N 117.9182662°W
- Status: Removed
- Opening date: February 8, 2001
- Closing date: November 1, 2014 (Note: Muppet*Vision 3D has officially been on hiatus at Disney's California Adventure since November 2, 2014. However, the attraction building has been remodeled since then, and the attraction has been removed from the Disneyland website. As such, the closing date is unofficial.)
- Replaced by: For the First Time in Forever: A Frozen Sing-Along Celebration (2015–2016); Mickey's PhilharMagic (2019–present)

Ride statistics
- Attraction type: 3D film
- Designer: Walt Disney Imagineering; Jim Henson Productions
- Theme: The Muppet Show
- Music: "The Muppet Show Theme" by Sam Pottle and Jim Henson
- Audience capacity: 580 per show
- Duration: 14:36
- Audio-animatronics: Yes
- Sponsor: Kodak (1991–2013)

Muppet*Vision 3D was a 3D film attraction featuring the Muppets formerly located at Disney's Hollywood Studios, at Walt Disney World in Orlando, Florida, and Disney California Adventure, at Disneyland Resort in Anaheim, California. Directed by Jim Henson (in his final major project before his death in 1990) and a co-production between Walt Disney Imagineering and Jim Henson Productions, the attraction incorporated the 3D film in conjunction with in-theater 4D effects, such as Audio-Animatronics, lighting, projections, smoke, soap bubbles, and a live full-bodied performer. Starring Henson, Frank Oz, Dave Goelz, Richard Hunt, and Steve Whitmire in multiple Muppet roles, the film featured a pre-show that led into Kermit the Frog guiding park guests on a tour of Muppet Studios, while the Muppets prepared their sketch acts to demonstrate their new breakthrough in 3D film technology. The show, however, completely unraveled when Dr. Bunsen Honeydew's experimental 3D sprite, Waldo, caused mayhem during the next portion of the show.

The attraction opened as Jim Henson's Muppet*Vision 3D on May 16, 1991 at Disney's Hollywood Studios (then Disney-MGM Studios), exactly a year after Henson's death, while the Disney California Adventure incarnation opened on February 8, 2001, and closed on November 1, 2014.

Muppet*Vision 3D at Disney's Hollywood Studios closed to guests on June 8, 2025. However, Disney cast members were given the opportunity to view the show a final time on June 10. It will be replaced by an area themed to Pixar's Monsters, Inc. franchise.

== History ==
=== Disney's Hollywood Studios (1991–2025) ===
The show was a 3D film featuring Jim Henson's Muppets. Due to the use of Audio-Animatronics, a live full-bodied Muppet and other similar effects, the show was sometimes referred to as "Muppet*Vision 4D" (which was used in The Walt Disney World Explorer application, displayed as "Jim Henson's Muppet*Vision ~~3D~~ 4D" with a slanted red strikethrough on "3D"). It was filmed in Soundstage 3 at the Walt Disney Studios in January 1990, written by Bill Prady and directed by Henson. The show was one of the final Muppets projects for Henson and veteran Muppet performer Richard Hunt, and was the last time they performed their characters. Henson died in 1990, before production of the film was completed, and Hunt died in 1992.

On August 28, 1989, Disney announced that they had an "agreement in principle" to acquire Henson Associates (now known as The Jim Henson Company) and the Muppet characters, and that a 3D Muppets attraction would debut at Disney–MGM Studios (now known as Disney's Hollywood Studios) the following May. Henson died before the attraction could debut, resulting in the cancellation of the acquisition, and the attraction, now known as Muppet*Vision 3D, was delayed. The attraction officially opened on May 16, 1991, on the first anniversary of Henson's death, after an agreement was reached to license the Muppets characters to Disney.

For the 2017 season, the Hollywood Studios location received a new entrance. The original Kermit sign was removed and it was replaced with a new theater marquee sign, and the name of the theater was changed to "Grand Arts Theater". In 2019, the original mural with Kermit and Miss Piggy from The Muppet Movie was removed from the building's side exterior, and was repainted to match the rest of the area's color scheme.

On October 2, 2023, Disney's Hollywood Studios announced that new projection mapping effects were added into their version of the attraction.

==== Closure ====
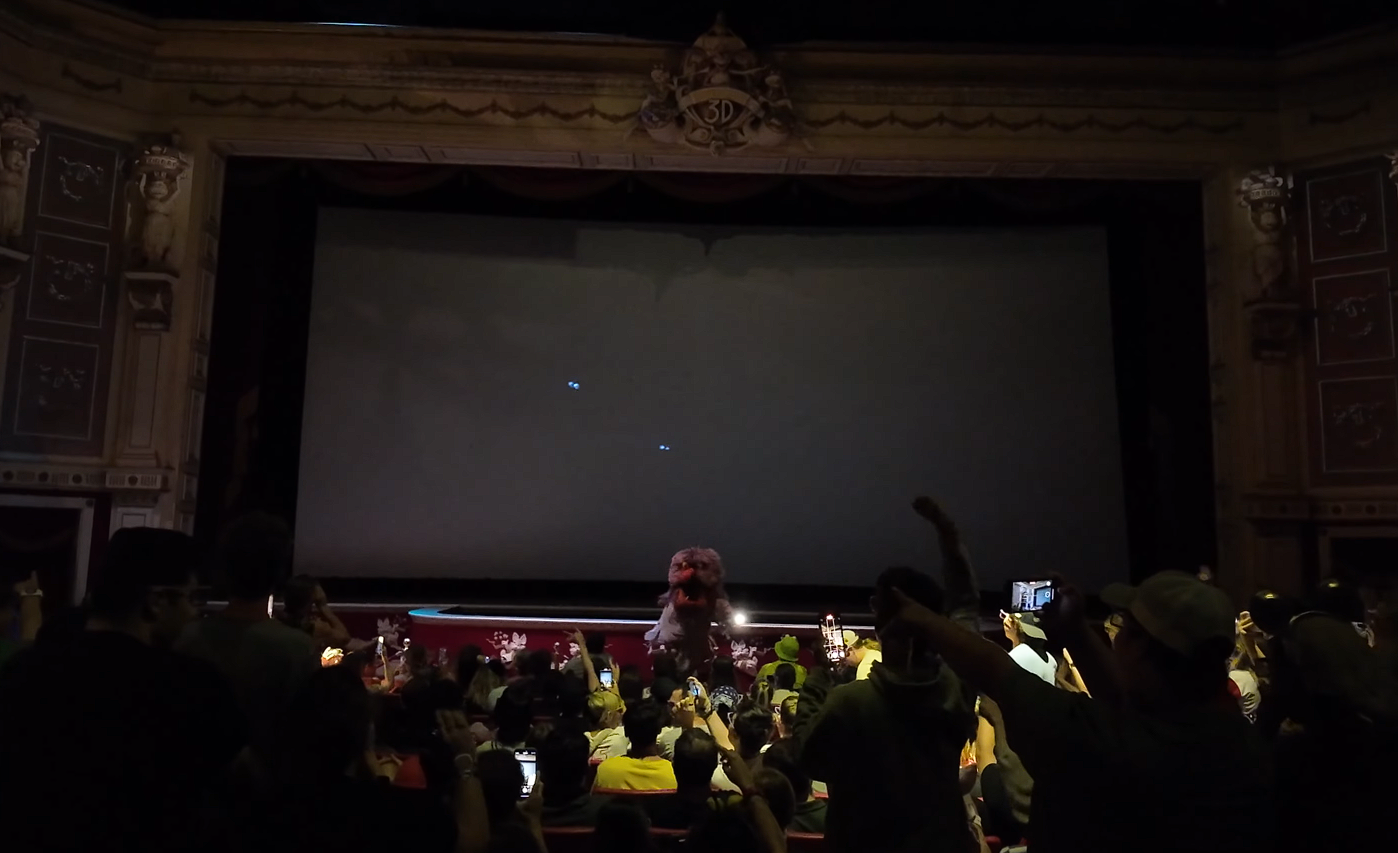
The audience cheers for Sweetums as he enters the theatre at the final show of Muppet*Vision 3D

Audience participation at the final showing of Muppet*Vision 3D
The audience helps look for Bean Bunny, followed by cheering as Sweetums enters the theatre, followed by the audience quoting lines from the film as the film plays.

In November 2024, Disney announced that Muppet*Vision 3D at Hollywood Studios would close to make way for a Monsters, Inc. themed area, stating that they were "having creative conversations and exploring ways to preserve the film and other parts of the experience for fans to enjoy in the future." In conjunction with Muppet*Vision 3D's closure, Disney announced that Rock 'n' Roller Coaster Starring Aerosmith would be re-themed to the Muppets, retitled to Rock 'n' Roller Coaster Starring The Muppets. In January 2025, it was announced that Muppet*Vision 3D would close on June 8, 2025.

In May 2025, Disney confirmed that they would be recording the show for preservation purposes. Cast members were allowed to sign up to be part of the taped audience, which took place on May 14. In February 2026, Brian Henson, son of Jim Henson, said that the show was recorded with virtual reality cameras, and the recording would be made available on the Apple Vision Pro and other VR headsets in the future. The final performance on June 7 was marked with a public appearance by Heather Henson, the daughter of Jim Henson.

=== Disney California Adventure (2001–2014) ===
Muppet*Vision 3D debuted as an opening day attraction at Disney California Adventure on February 8, 2001, almost ten years after its Walt Disney World debut. Throughout the attraction's operation at Disney California Adventure, the theater was used to present sneak peeks of Tron: Legacy, Frankenweenie, and Oz the Great and Powerful.

==== Closure ====
The attraction closed on November 1, 2014, in what was originally supposed to be a temporary closure, but in May 2015, Disney confirmed that the attraction's closure was permanent. On January 7, 2015, the theater at Disney California Adventure began operating as the Crown Jewel Theatre and presented For the First Time in Forever: A Frozen Sing-Along Celebration, a musical stage show based on Frozen. The attraction operated until April 17, 2016. The location was renamed to the Sunset Showcase Theater and began showing Walt Disney Pictures film previews in May 2016. In April 2019, the Sunset Showcase Theater began showing Mickey's PhilharMagic.

== Attraction ==
=== Queue ===
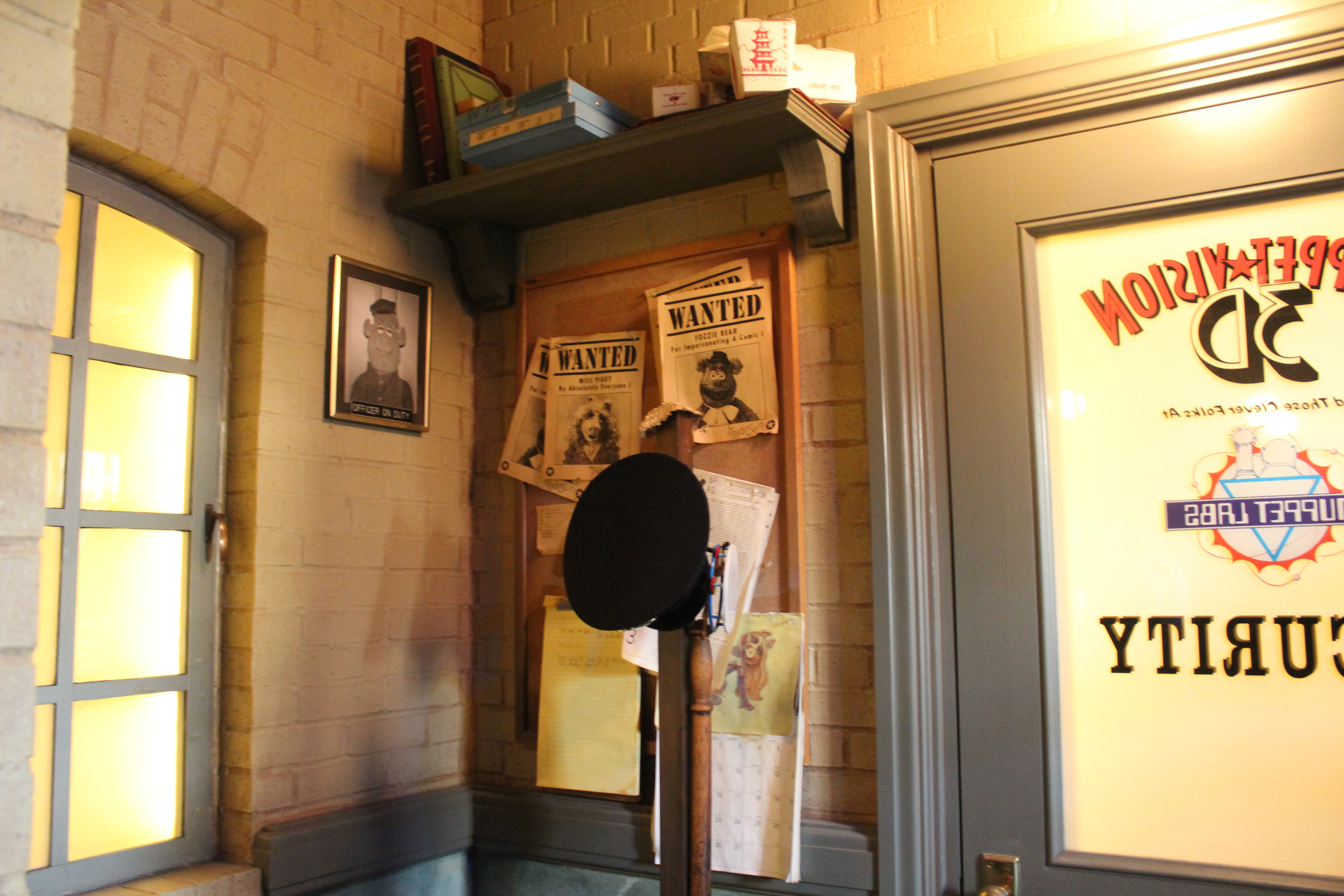
Indoor queue at Disney's Hollywood Studios

Before guests were seated in the theater where the film was shown, they went through the queue, which wound through "Muppet Labs", home of Dr. Bunsen Honeydew and his assistant Beaker. The audience passed several office doors, all featuring outlandish job descriptions and spoof movie posters featuring the Muppets, including The Bride of Froggen-Schwein, The Pigseidon Adventure, and SuperBeaker II. Guests then entered a large room filled with Muppet "props" and boxes with comical and humorous labels. Above guests' heads were sets of three television monitors, where the pre-show featuring several Muppets was shown.

At Disney California Adventure, the queue wound around a fake "set", blending in with the rest of the Hollywood Land district. Guests also saw half of a motorbike protruding from the wall above, with a hole in the shape of Gonzo. The pre-show room there included a scrolling LED monitor known as The Official Time Clock which displayed various messages and jokes (including references to Elvis Presley and The Mickey Mouse Club) while counting down to showtime.

In the spring of 2008, the Disney California Adventure queue was replaced with an eating area for the nearby Award Weiners restaurant in order to provide more seating for it. The spoof movie posters were removed, replaced by actual posters from then-upcoming films from Walt Disney Studios as well as posters promoting Disney+ shows. The original "Disaster Effects" storage area remained until January 2015.

From March 2014 to December 2016, the pre-show was edited to include Constantine, the villain from the 2014 sequel Muppets Most Wanted, to promote the new film. Likewise, in October 2021, the majority of the pre-show was replaced with a promo for the 2021 Halloween special Muppets Haunted Mansion, hosted by Pepe the King Prawn, one of the main protagonists of the special.

=== Pre-show ===
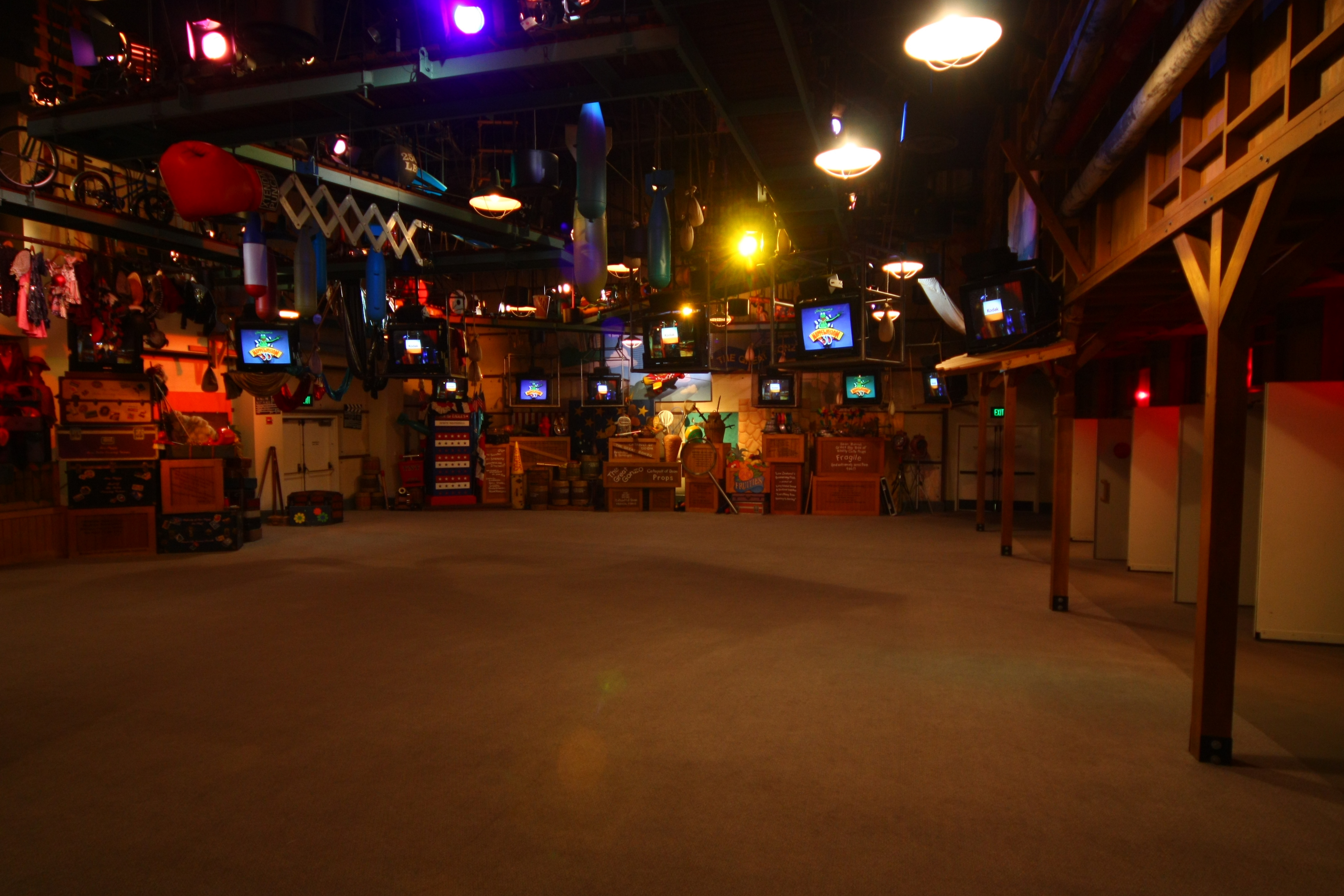
Pre-show area as it appeared at Disney California Adventure

Inside the prop warehouse pre-show waiting area, guests watched a film that showed the Muppets preparing for their upcoming show. The pre-show began with a construction crew attempting to hang a series of Kodak signs (after Kodak left the sponsorship, the signs were also turned into Muppet*Vision 3D title cards) and a Muppet*Vision 3D title card, with comical results. The preparations for the show were supervised by stage manager Scooter, who first has to deal with a series of technical difficulties. As Scooter attempted to get the show in order, he got constantly interrupted by the cast. Fozzie Bear first interrupts, as while it initially appears that he was trying to get the penguins ready in the orchestra, it eventually became clear that he was also trying to present his new musical act, The Three Ds. The group then performed a disastrous version of "By the Light of the Silvery Moon". Bean Bunny was later prepping for Miss Piggy's musical number, ignoring Scooter's warnings not to interrupt her and is eventually karate chopped across the room by her. Gonzo then took center stage in the film when he sends Scooter away to answer the telephone (despite the fact that Muppets do not have one). Gonzo then tried to tap dance with a vase of flowers on his head. After Bean's attempt to once again help Miss Piggy, Sam Eagle appears to provide guests safety instructions, which Gonzo interrupted with news that Mickey Mouse is in the building, only to reveal that it was just Rizzo the Rat wearing Mickey Mouse ears. Finally, a stampede of Muppets run over Sam and enter the theater and guests follow them in.

=== Main show ===
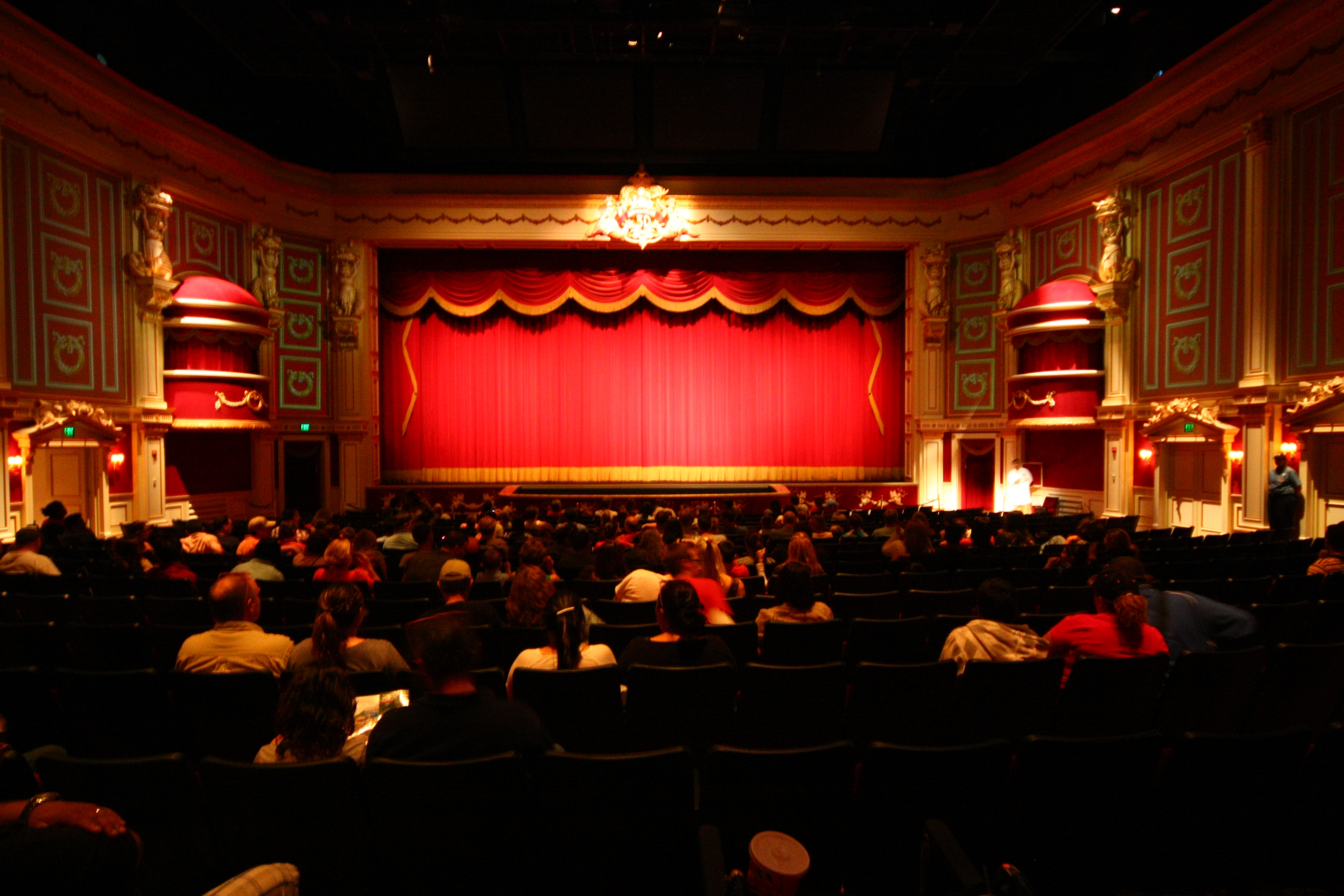
Inside the Muppet*Vision 3D theater, at Disney California Adventure. Both the Orlando and Anaheim incarnations shared the same design.

In addition to the Muppets on-screen, there were also a number of in-theater audio-animatronic Muppets that interact with the show: Statler and Waldorf heckled from their balcony near the screen, an orchestra of penguins rose into sight to perform, and the Swedish Chef "operated" the film projector from the booth above and behind the audience.

As the curtain rises, Gonzo appears behind a door and pushes a stick labeled "3D" towards the audience. Kermit the Frog appears and welcomes the audience to Muppet*Vision 3D. He then gives the audience a tour of Muppet Studios, where many of the Muppets are preparing for segments in the show, including a song by Miss Piggy, and musical finale by Sam. As this point, Kermit is interrupted by Fozzie, who performs a series of "cheap 3D tricks". This includes a noisemaker, a can of springs, and a flower that sprays water. Statler and Waldorf heckle Fozzie, telling him that his act is not funny even in 3D.

Kermit then takes the audience to Muppet Studios' secret laboratory and introduces Dr. Bunsen Honeydew and his assistant, Beaker. However, Bunsen and Beaker are unable to control their newest invention, a living 3D effect called Waldo C. Graphic (who first appeared on The Jim Henson Hour in 1989). Waldo proves to be uncontrollable and wreaks havoc in the lab. Bunsen tells Beaker to use the lab's inflatomatic to deactivate Waldo. He does so, but instead of being deactivated, Waldo explodes into smaller versions of himself. Bunsen then tells Beaker to use the lab's vacuum cleaner to suck up all the Waldos, but also accidentally sucks up the entire lab. All but one Waldo is sucked up and realizing he is free, shape shifts into a taxi cab and drives away.

Kermit then reappears. Fozzie returns and attempts to demonstrate his flying pie but it malfunctions and hits him in the face. Kermit then introduces Miss Piggy's musical rendition of "Dream a Little Dream of Me". Bean attempts to assist Miss Piggy by using various props to add 3D effects. These include bubbles blown from a bubble maker. To add to the realism, real soap bubbles are blown from the ceiling of the theater. Miss Piggy gets annoyed and Bean then gives her a rope, explaining that it is for the water skiing finale. A boat pulls Miss Piggy into the pond and out of the scene and a frustrated Sam sends Bean away. Bean then meets Waldo and together, they leave the film. Gonzo sees Bean and Waldo leaving and goes to find Kermit. Gonzo gathers Kermit and Fozzie to help him look for Bean. Sweetums (who is a live full-bodied Muppet) comes out into the audience to search for him after having already done so on screen. With help from the audience, he finds Bean on the other side balcony, across from Statler and Waldorf. He explains why he ran away and agrees to stay if he can help in the finale. Kermit, Fozzie, and Gonzo decide to let Bean shoot off the fireworks.

Kermit then introduces the finale with a toy soldier marching band playing patriotic music. During their performance, Waldo bounces on their heads and one of the tuba players gets his head stuck inside. Since he cannot see, he runs into people and causes them to fall down. Sam then tells Bean to shoot off the fireworks. To show off, Waldo shape shifts into a rocket and zooms around Miss Piggy, who is dressed like the Statue of Liberty, and accidentally tears off her skirt. Waldo then plummets into the penguin orchestra, causing smoke to rise. Sweetums reappears out in the audience and tells Chef to stop the projector. He then puts out the fire with water, which infuriates the penguins and they decide to retaliate with a cannon. After Sweetums tells the audience to duck, the penguins fire their cannon and hit the projector.

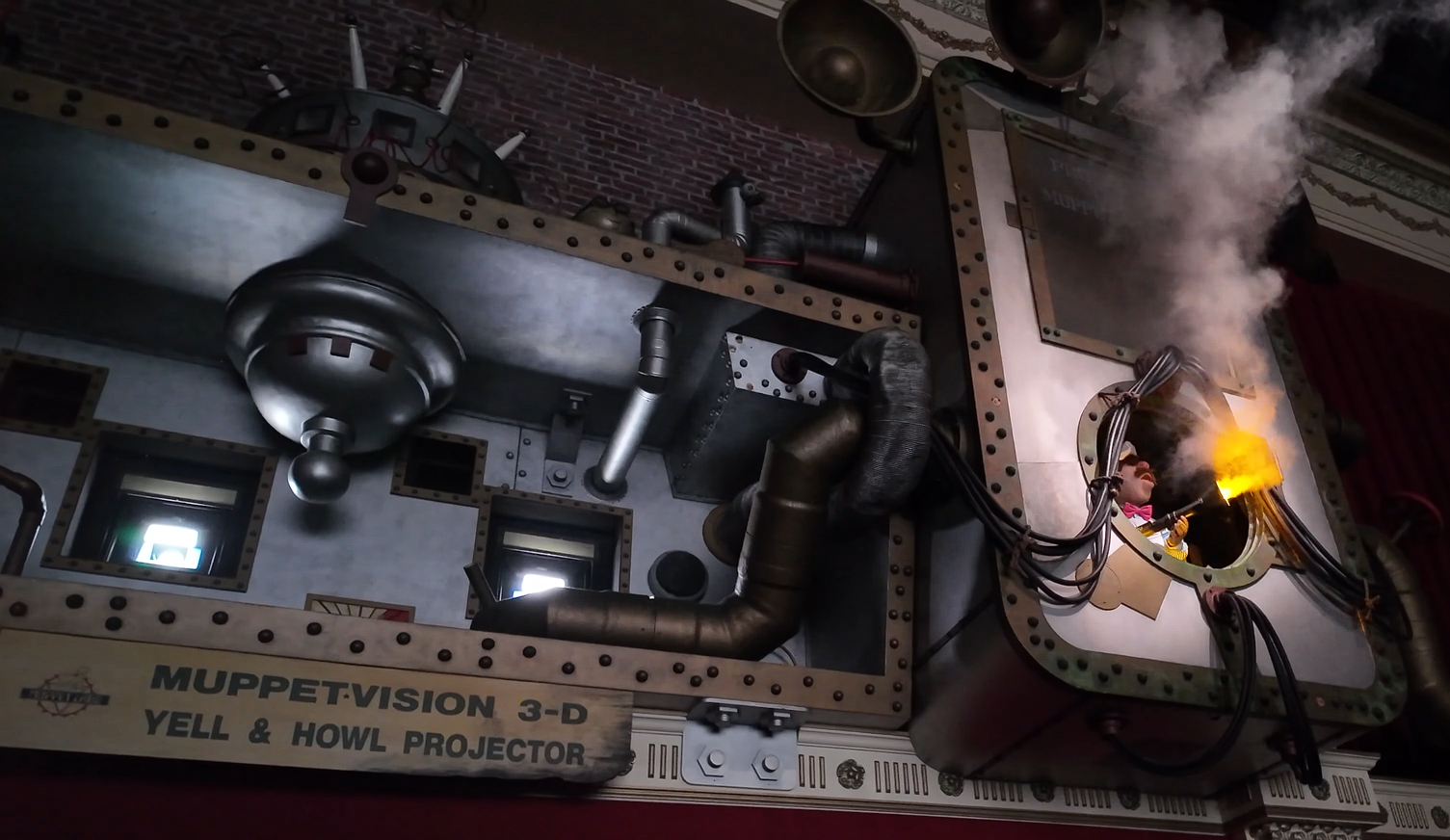
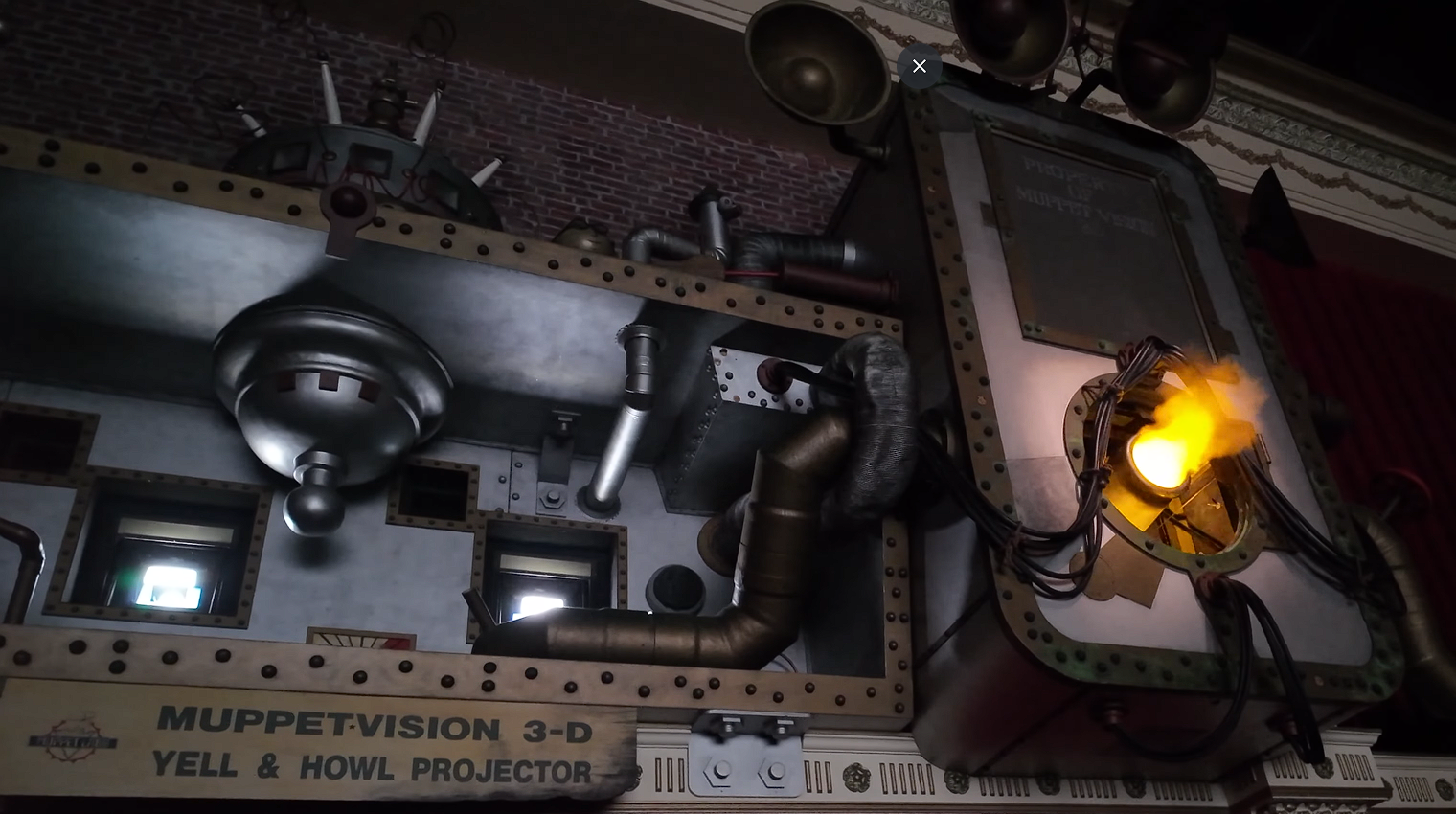
The Swedish Chef attempts to attack Waldo, starting with a gun (top) and ending with a cannon (bottom).

The Swedish Chef then tries to destroy Waldo, who has escaped from the film and is now all alone on a blank screen, by firing a gun at him. After missing several times, Chef decides to use a cannon. This causes an explosion as the theater blows up, tearing a hole in the screen, as well as "revealing" some bricks and sheetrock throughout the main theater, and revealing what is on the "other side" of the screen: guests at a Disney park. Statler and Waldorf (now hiding in their box), hold up white flags in surrender. Kermit then appears on the back of a fire engine through the hole to apologize for the chaos. He then bids the audience farewell and the curtains close. Waldo appears one last time and shape shifts into Mickey Mouse so that nobody would recognize him. However, he shape shifts back to his true form as a vacuum sucks him up. Bean comments on what a cute ending the show was as the curtains on his balcony close. Then, Statler and Waldorf do some commentary regarding the next show, the curtains on their balcony close, and the show ends.

== Cast ==
=== Main performers ===
- Jim Henson – Kermit the Frog, Waldorf, The Swedish Chef
- Frank Oz – Miss Piggy, Fozzie Bear, Sam Eagle, Construction Worker Boss
- Dave Goelz – Gonzo the Great, Dr. Bunsen Honeydew, Zoot, Rick, Dinah
- Richard Hunt – Scooter, Statler, Beaker, Sweetums (voice only), Chuck, Chicken
- Steve Whitmire – Waldo C. Graphic, Bean Bunny, Rizzo the Rat
- John Henson – Sweetums (on-screen only)
- David Rudman – Roy, Max
- Kathryn Mullen – Dorothy
- Wayne Allwine – Waldo's impersonation of Mickey Mouse

=== Additional performers ===
- Kevin Carlson
- Rick Lyon
- Allan Trautman
- Rickey Boyd
- Bruce Lanoil
- Terri Hardin
- Steven Ritz-Barr
- Len Levitt
- Joe Selph
- Mark Bryan Wilson

== Gallery ==
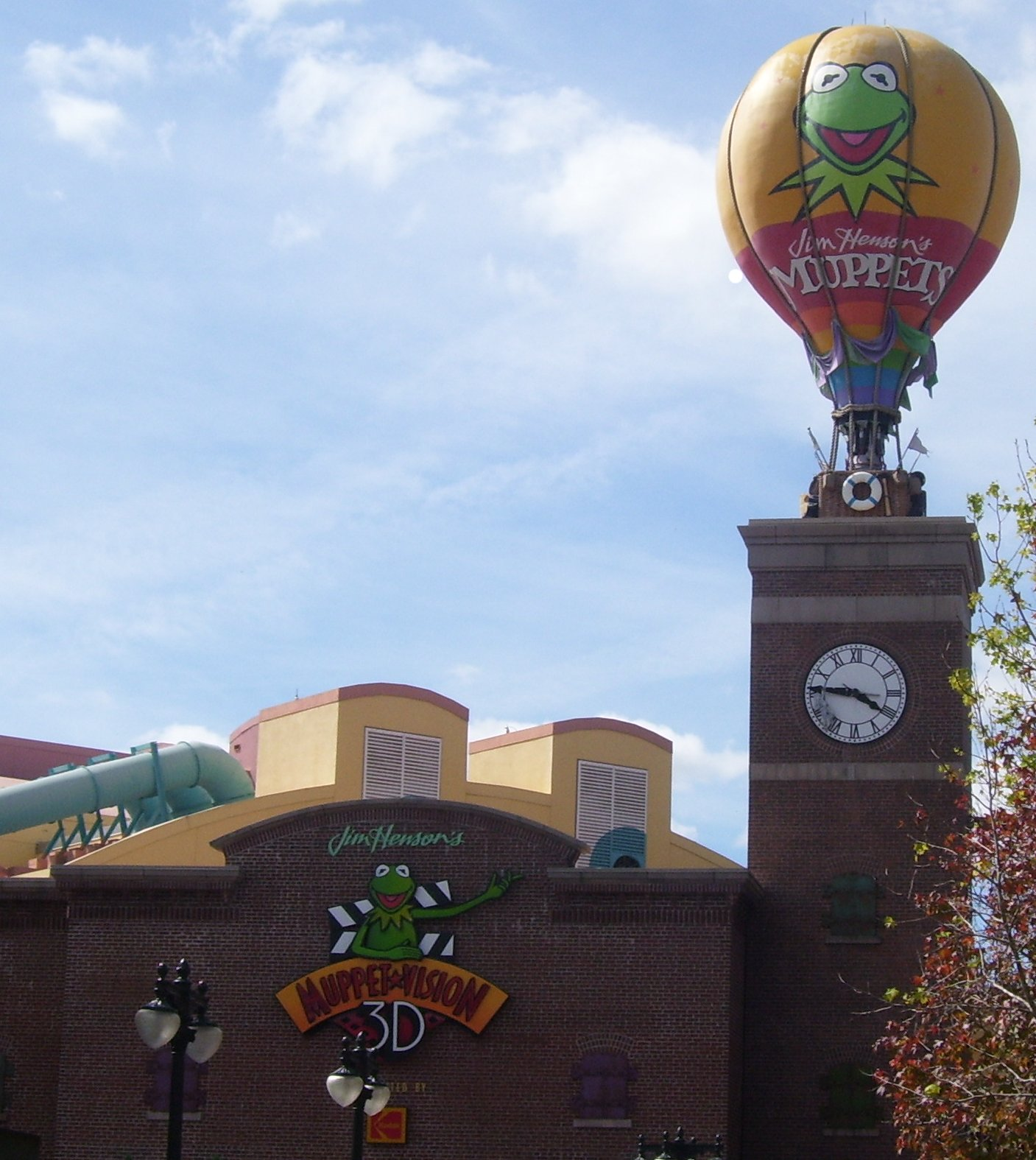
Original 1991–2004 exterior facade at Disney's Hollywood Studios, with Jim Henson's name attached to the attraction.

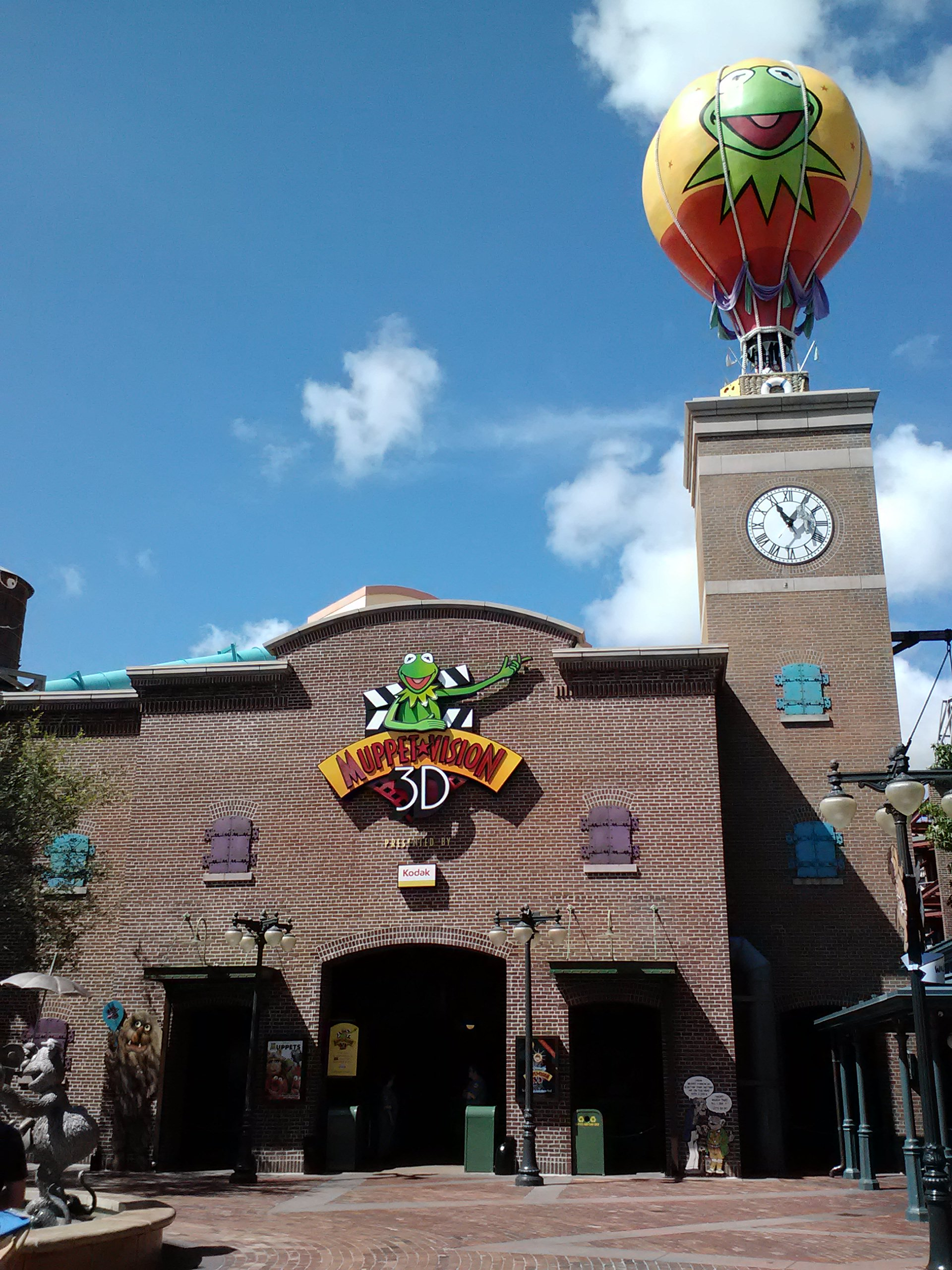
2004–2013 exterior facade during Kodak's sponsorship, with Jim Henson's name removed.

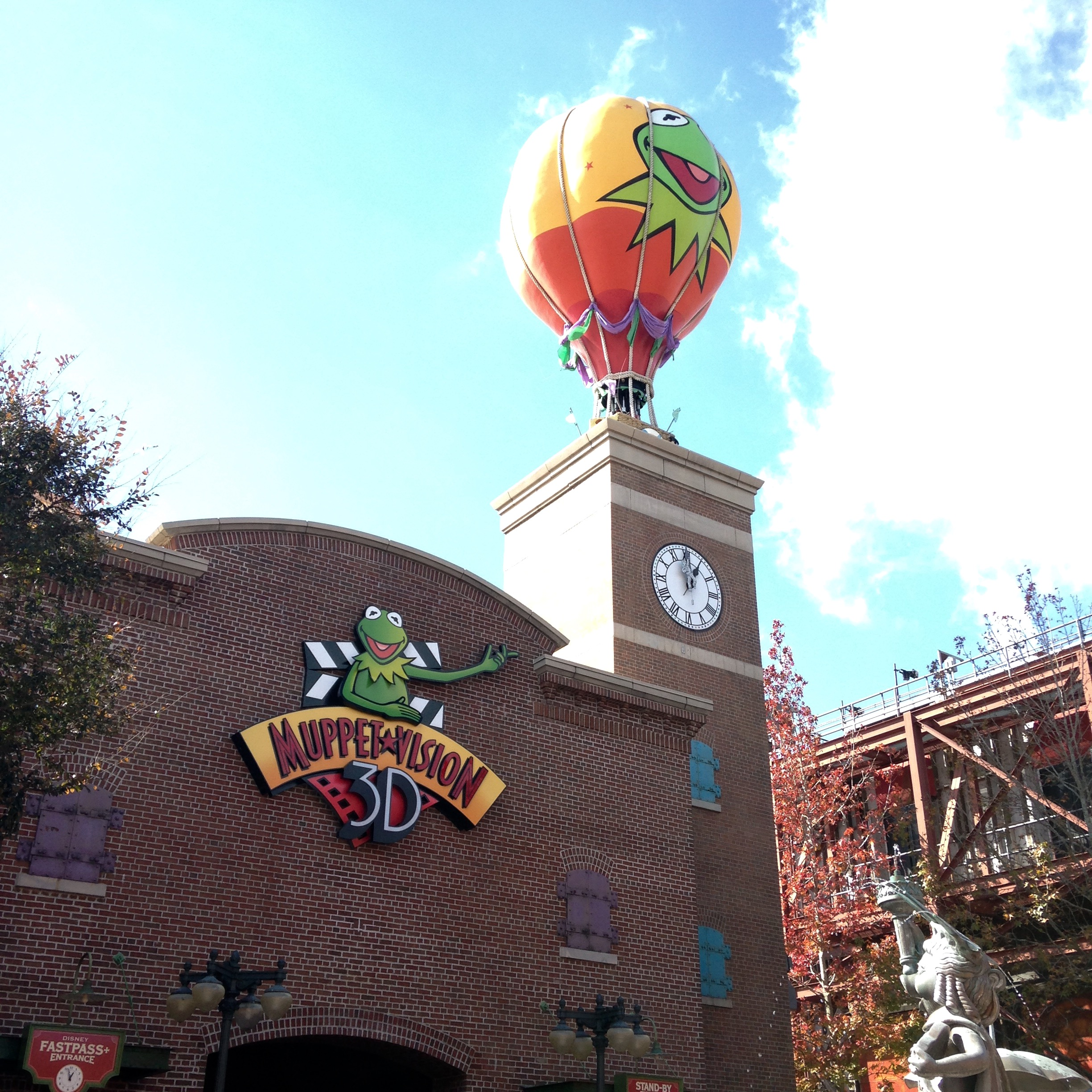
2013–2017 exterior facade.

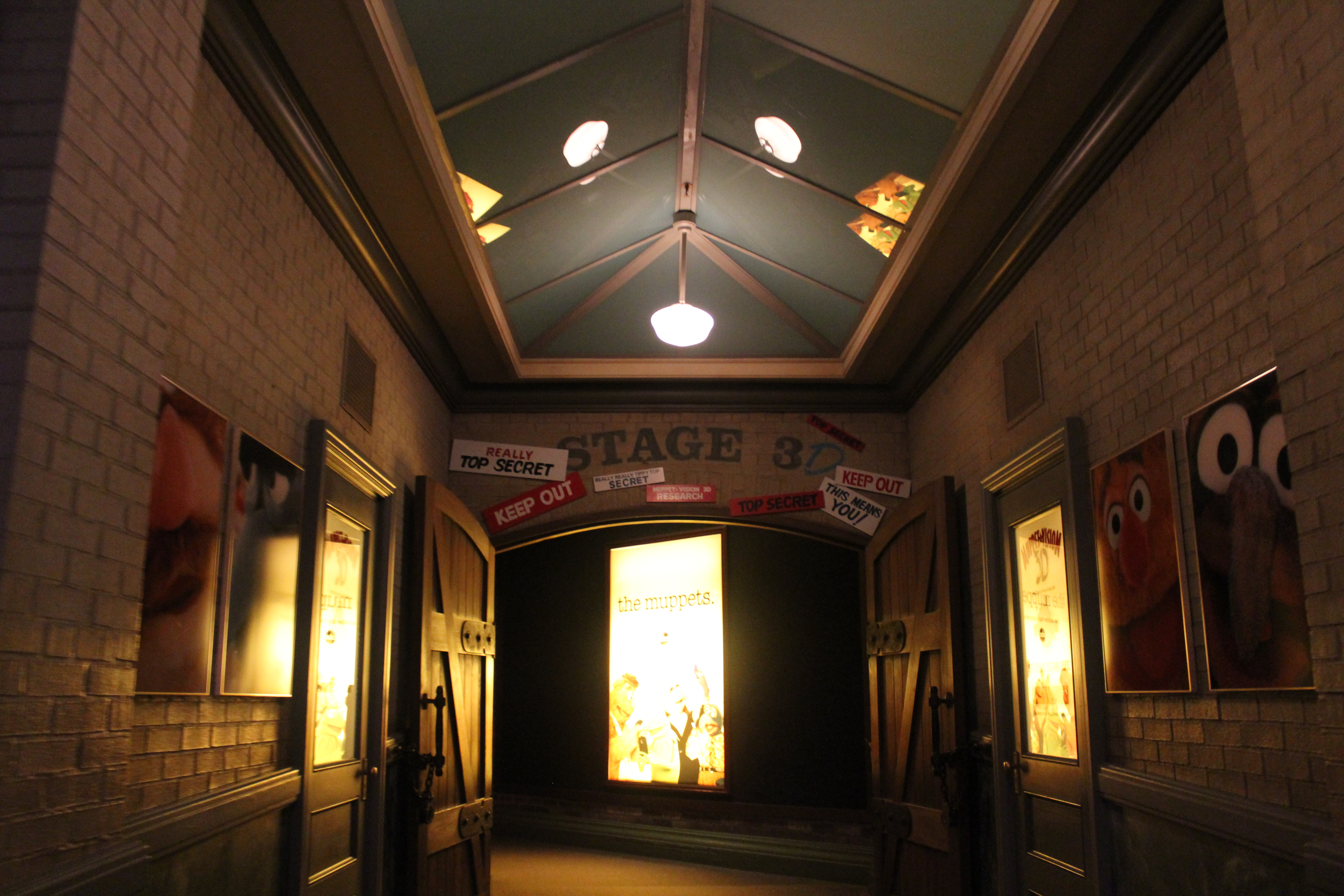
Attraction queue.

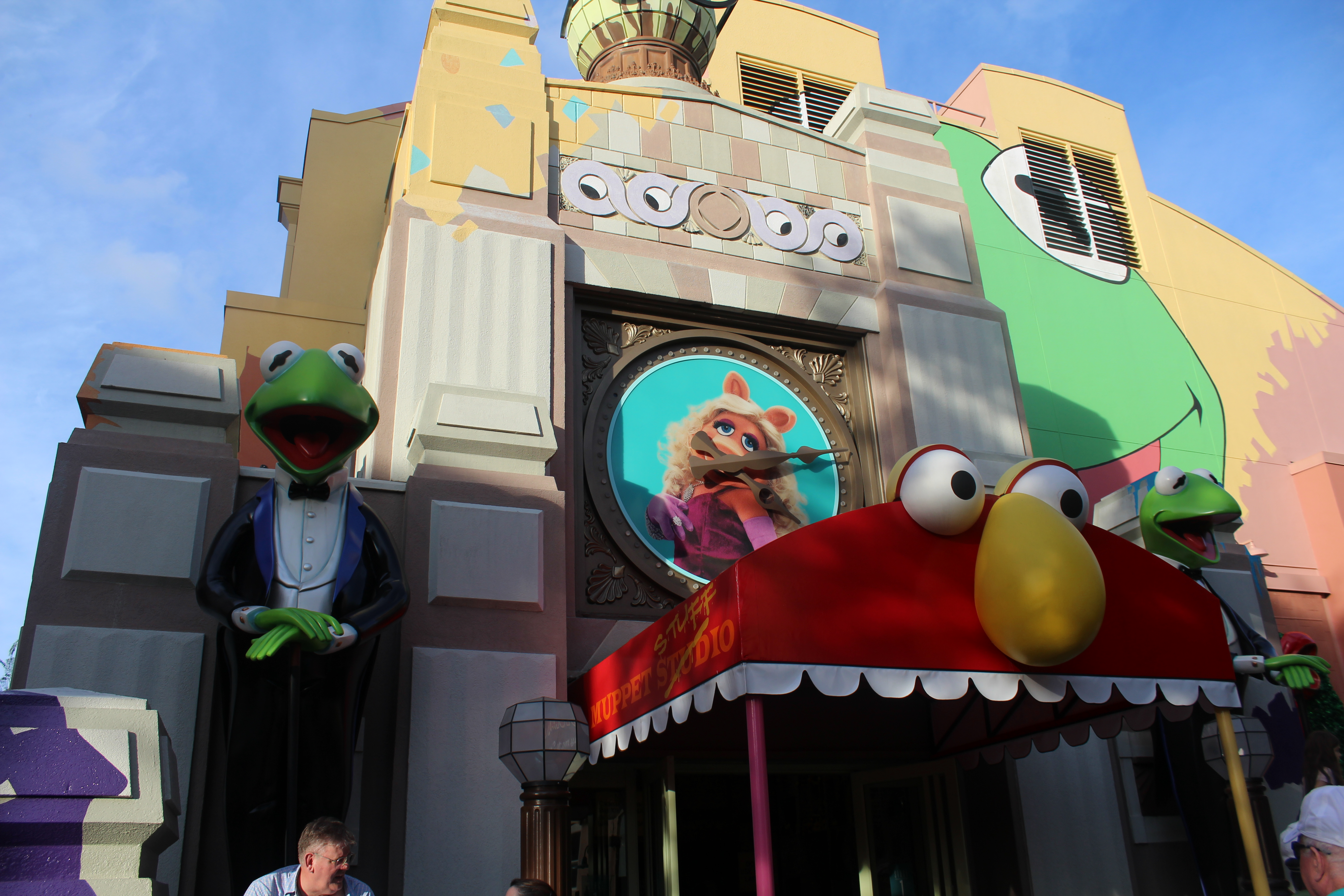
Stage 1 Company Store, the attraction's gift shop, which operated until 2020.

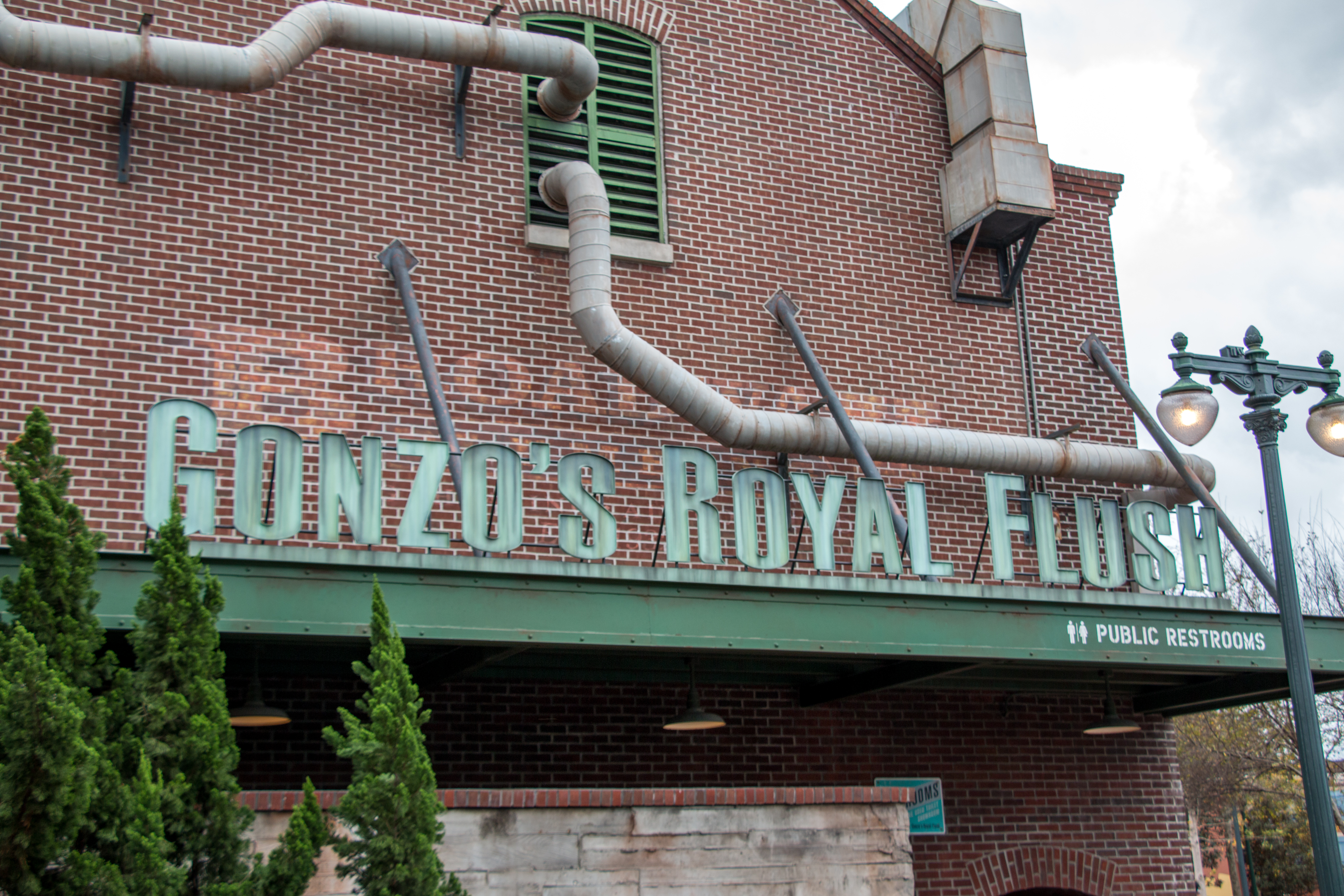
Restrooms across from the attraction, themed to The Muppets (2011).

Original marquee at Disney California Adventure, with Jim Henson's name attached to the attraction.

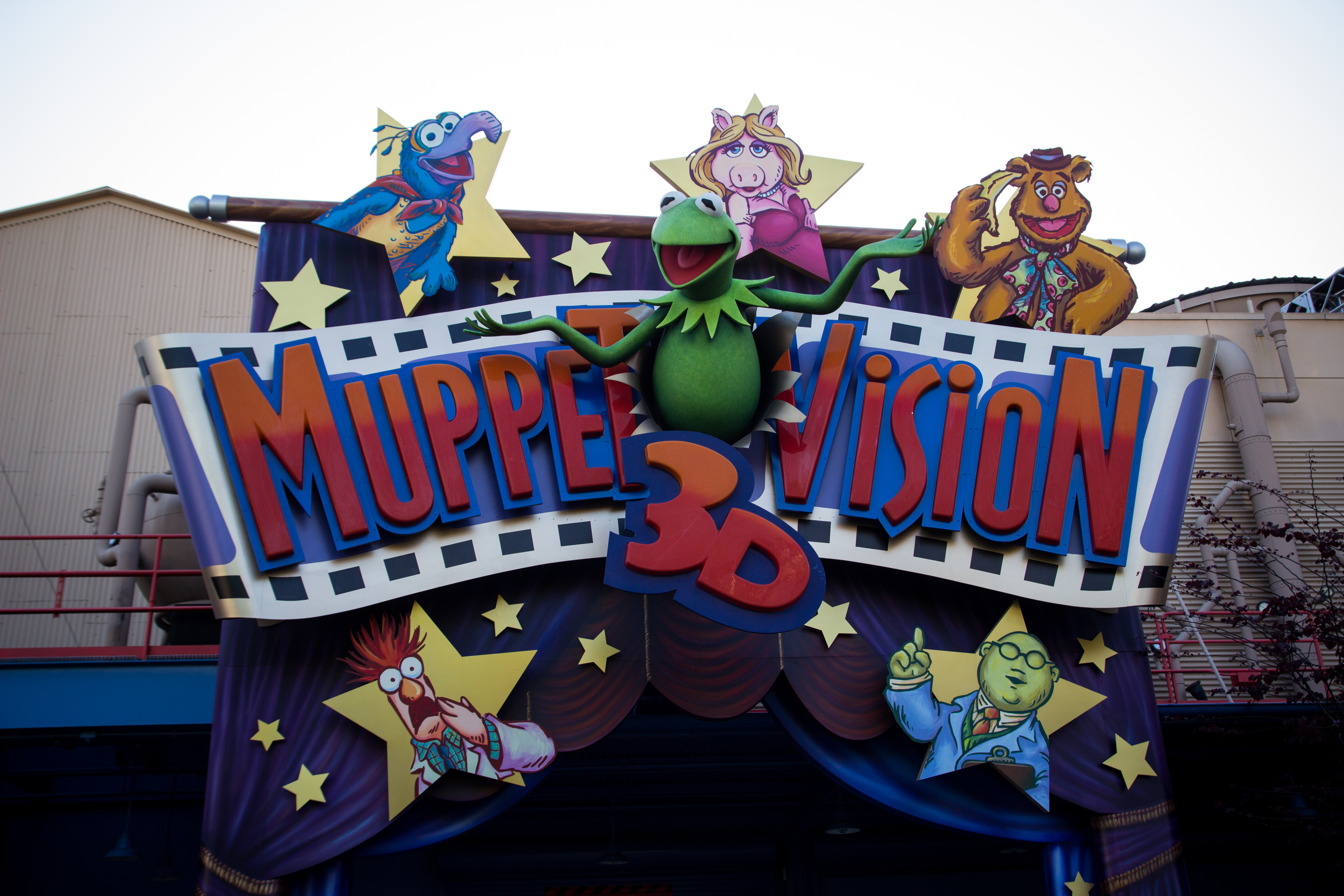
The second and final version of the attraction's marquee at Disney California Adventure, with Jim Henson's name removed.

== See also ==
- List of 3D films
- List of amusement rides based on television franchises
- The Muppets Present: Great Moments in American History
