= List of Walt Disney World Resort attractions =

Interactive map of Walt Disney World. Epcot in magenta, Magic Kingdom in purple, Hollywood Studios in red and Animal Kingdom in green.

This is a list of many past and current attractions & entertainment at Walt Disney World Resort in Lake Buena Vista, Florida. The Walt Disney World Resort website breaks down attractions & entertainment into the following categories: Thrill Rides, Shows & Fireworks, Character Experiences, Parades, and Play Disney Parks. The website also tags attractions using the following keywords: action & adventure, big drops, dark, indoor, live entertainment, loud, scary, slow rides, small drops, spinning, street shows, "streetmosphere", and water rides.

== Magic Kingdom ==
=== Thrill Rides ===
- Big Thunder Mountain Railroad
- Seven Dwarfs Mine Train
- Space Mountain
- Tron Lightcycle Power Run
- Tiana's Bayou Adventure

=== Other Attractions ===
- Astro Orbiter
- The Barnstormer
- Buzz Lightyear's Space Ranger Spin
- Casey Jr. Splash 'n' Soak Station
- Cinderella Castle
- Country Bear Musical Jamboree
- Dumbo the Flying Elephant
- Enchanted Tales with Belle
- The Hall of Presidents
- The Haunted Mansion
- It's a Small World
- Jungle Cruise
- Mad Tea Party
- The Magic Carpets of Aladdin
- Main Street Vehicles
- The Many Adventures of Winnie the Pooh
- Mickey's Magical Friendship Faire show
- Mickey's PhilharMagic
- Monsters, Inc. Laugh Floor
- Peter Pan's Flight
- PeopleMover
- A Pirate's Adventure ~ Treasures of the Seven Seas
- Pirates of the Caribbean
- Prince Charming Regal Carrousel
- Smellephants on Parade
- Swiss Family Treehouse
- Tomorrowland Speedway
- Under the Sea ~ Journey of The Little Mermaid
- Walt Disney World Railroad
- Walt Disney's Carousel of Progress
- Walt Disney's Enchanted Tiki Room

=== Defunct Attractions ===
- Delta Dreamflight
- Frontierland Shootin' Arcade
- If You Had Wings
- Liberty Square Riverboat (Permanently closed on July 7, 2025)
- Stitch's Alien Encounter Character Greeting!
- Stitch's Great Escape! (Permanently closed on January 8, 2018)
- Splash Mountain (Permanently closed on January 22, 2023)
- Mr. Toad's Wild Ride (Permanently closed on September 7, 1998)
- Snow White's Scary Adventures (Permanently closed on May 31, 2012)
- Disney's Sky Way (Permanently closed on November 9, 1999)
- Tom Sawyer Island (Permanently closed on July 7, 2025)

== Epcot ==
=== Thrill Rides ===
- Guardians of the Galaxy: Cosmic Rewind
- Mission: Space
- Test Track

=== Other Attractions ===
- Mission: Space Advanced Training Lab
- The American Adventure
- American Heritage Gallery
- Awesome Planet
- Bijutsu-kan Gallery
- Bruce's Shark World
- Canada Far and Wide
- Disney Animals
- Disney & Pixar Short Film Festival
- Frozen Ever After
- Meet and Greet Anna and Elsa from Frozen
- Gallery of Arts and History
- Gran Fiesta Tour Starring The Three Caballeros
- House of the Whispering Willows
- ImageWorks: The What-If Labs
- EPCOT International Flower & Garden Festival
- Journey into Imagination with Figment
- Journey of Water, Inspired by Moana
- Kidcot Fun Stops
- Living with the Land
- Mexico Folk Art Gallery
- Palais du Cinema:
  - Impressions de France
  - Beauty and the Beast: Sing-Along film
- Project Tomorrow: Inventing the Wonders of the Future
- Remy's Ratatouille Adventure
- Reflections of China
- SeaBase
- The Seas with Nemo & Friends
- Soarin'
- Spaceship Earth
- Stave Church Gallery
- Turtle Talk with Crush

== Disney's Hollywood Studios ==
=== Thrill Rides ===
- Star Wars: Millennium Falcon – Smugglers Run
- Rock 'n' Roller Coaster Starring The Muppets
- Slinky Dog Dash
- Star Wars: Rise of the Resistance
- The Twilight Zone Tower of Terror

=== Other Attractions ===
- Alien Swirling Saucers
- Beauty and the Beast Live on Stage
- Disney Jr. Mickey Mouse Clubhouse Live!
- Disney Movie Magic
- Disney Villains: Unfairly Ever After
- Fantasmic! (only at Night)
- For the First Time in Forever: A Frozen Sing-Along Celebration
- Indiana Jones Epic Stunt Spectacular!
- Mickey & Minnie's Runaway Railway
- Mickey Short Theater
  - Vacation Fun – An Original Animated Short with Mickey & Minnie
- Star Tours – The Adventures Continue
- Star Wars Launch Bay
- The Little Mermaid – A Musical Adventure
- Toy Story Midway Mania!
- Walt Disney Presents
- Wonderful World of Animation

=== Defunct Attractions ===
- Disney Junior – Live on Stage! (Permanently closed on September 2, 2025)
- Muppet*Vision 3D (Permanently closed on June 7, 2025)
- Lightning McQueen's Racing Academy (Permanently closed on October 7, 2024)
- Star Wars: A Galactic Spectacular (Permanently closed on March 16, 2020)
- Voyage of the Little Mermaid (Permanently closed on March 15, 2020)
- Jedi Training: Trials of the Temple (Permanently closed on March 16, 2020)
- Disney Junior Dance Party! (Permanently closed on September 25, 2020)
- The Great Movie Ride (Permanently closed on August 13, 2017)
- Honey, I Shrunk the Kids: Movie Set Adventure (Permanently closed on April 2, 2016)
- Lights, Motors, Action!: Extreme Stunt Show (Permanently closed in April 2016)
- The Magic of Disney Animation (Permanently closed on July 12, 2015)
- The Legend of Captain Jack Sparrow (Permanently closed on November 6, 2014)
- Studio Backlot Tour (Permanently closed on September 28, 2014)
- The American Idol Experience (Permanently closed on August 30, 2014)
- Journey into Narnia: Prince Caspian (Permanently closed on September 10, 2011)
- Star Tours (Replaced by prequel Star Tours - The Adventures Continue on May 20, 2011)
- Who Wants to Be a Millionaire – Play It! (Permanently closed on August 19, 2006)
- The Hunchback of Notre Dame – A Musical Adventure (Permanently closed on September 28, 2002)
- Doug Live! (Permanently closed on May 12, 2001)
- The Monster Show (Permanently closed on February 20, 1999)
- Superstar Television (Permanently closed on September 26, 1998)
- The Spirit of Pocahontas (Permanently closed in 1996)
- Here Come the Muppets (Permanently closed in 1992)

== Disney's Animal Kingdom ==
=== Thrill Rides ===
- Avatar Flight of Passage
- Expedition Everest
- Kali River Rapids

=== Other Attractions ===
- Affection Section
- Animal Encounters: Winged Encounters – The Kingdom Takes Flight
- The Animation Experience at Conservation Station
- Discovery Island Trails
- Feathered Friends in Flight
- Festival of the Lion King
- Finding Nemo: The Big Blue... and Beyond!
- Gorilla Falls Exploration Trail
- Habitat Habit!
- Kilimanjaro Safaris (Great For Kids)
- Maharajah Jungle Trek
- Na'vi River Journey
- The Oasis Exhibits
- Tree of Life
- Wild Africa Trek
- Wilderness Explorers
- Wildlife Express Train

=== Defunct Attractions ===
- Cretaceous Trail
- Dino Sue
- Dinosaur (Permanently closed on February 2, 2026)
- The Boneyard (Permanently closed on September 1, 2025)
- It's Tough to Be a Bug! (Permanently closed on March 16, 2025)
- TriceraTop Spin (Permanently closed on January 12, 2025)
- Fossil Fun Games (Permanently closed on January 12, 2025)
- A Celebration of Festival of the Lion King (Permanently closed on July 4, 2022)
- Primeval Whirl (Permanently closed on March 16, 2020)
- Finding Nemo – The Musical (Permanently closed on March 16, 2020)
- UP! A Great Bird Adventure (Permanently closed on March 16, 2020)

== Disney Springs ==
=== Marketplace ===
- Marketplace Carousel
- Marketplace Train Express

==== Cirque du Soleil ====
- Drawn to Life – Opened November 18, 2021
- La Nouba – Closed on December 31, 2017

== See also ==
- List of Disney theme park attractions
- List of Disney attractions that were never built
- List of Disneyland attractions
- List of former Disneyland attractions
