= Wild Africa Trek =

Experience at Walt Disney World Resort

Disney's Animal Kingdom
- Area: Africa
- Status: Operating
- Opening date: January 16, 2011

Ride statistics
- Attraction type: Guided Tour
- Designer: Walt Disney Imagineering
- Theme: Safari
- Duration: 180 minutes
- Height restriction: 48 in (122 cm)
- This is a pay-per-use attraction

Wild Africa Trek is an additional paid experience at Disney's Animal Kingdom on the Walt Disney World Resort property in Bay Lake, Florida.

It is a three-hour guided trek simulating a bushwalk through the wilderness for the first half and traveling through the savanna on a VIP safari vehicle for the latter half.

== Background ==
In 2008, rumors of Disney's Night Kingdom, a fifth theme park at Walt Disney World were abounding. The proposed addition was to be a “niche park”, limiting the number of guests and operating in the afternoon and evening. Disney's Night Kingdom never became a reality but ideas for the park were implemented into the Wild Africa Trek. The news of “guided treks” being done on the savannah of Kilimanjaro Safaris was first announced July 2010. Construction of the rope bridges over the Nile crocodiles and safari camp in the savannah began October of the same year. However the first treks did not begin until January 2011.

== The Tour ==
Excursion guides take guests through the fictional East African village of Harambe and explore various parts of the Harambe Wildlife Reserve. The trek walks through a portion of the Gorilla Falls Exploration Trail and embarks unto unexplored forests areas. Guests experience up-close views of hippos and Nile crocodiles, as well as cross rope bridges right above the animals.

After exiting the forests, guests board a safari vehicle unlike the open-sided trucks of Kilimanjaro Safaris. The vehicle travels through the Serengeti Savanna making frequent pull offs to allow guests to stand up and view the animals. The vehicle makes a stop at the safari camp in the middle of the savannah known as the Boma where guests are given an African inspired snack.

== See also ==
- 2011 in amusement parks
