= Tiffins =

Restaurant at Disney's Animal Kingdom

Restaurant information
- Established: May 2016
- Owner: Disney Experiences
- Food type: African, Asian, Latin American
- Location: Bay Lake, Orange County, Florida, United States

Tiffins is a restaurant in Disney's Animal Kingdom, one of the four main parks at Walt Disney World in Bay Lake, Florida, United States. It serves food inspired by both Asian, African, and Latin American cuisine. The restaurant opened in May 2016.

== Overview ==
Tiffins contains three dining rooms and as of opening had 252 seats. The largest of the dining rooms, known as Grand Gallery, is based after the many different animals in the park. The other two, known as the Trek Gallery and the Safari Gallery, are themed around Asia and Africa, respectively. The restaurant walls are also home to a large gallery of artwork and notes from the imagineers of the Animal Kingdom theme park, and in some ways the restaurant itself doubles as a gallery.
