= Maharajah Jungle Trek =

Attraction at Disney's Animal Kingdom

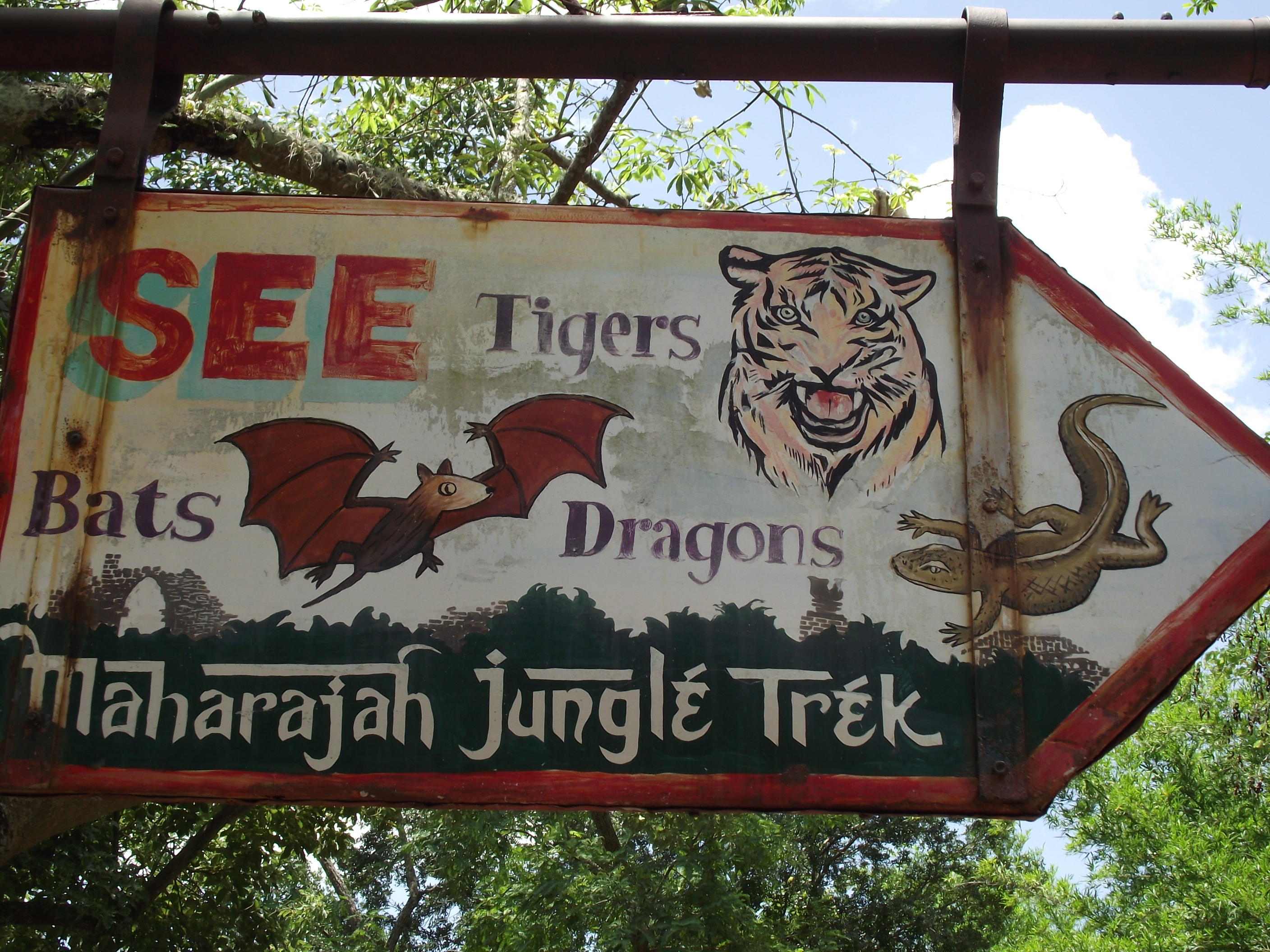
- Entrance sign

Disney's Animal Kingdom
- Area: Asia
- Coordinates: 28°21′36.05″N 81°35′21.44″W
- Status: Operating
- Opening date: March 1, 1999

Ride statistics
- Attraction type: Walking Trail
- Designer: Walt Disney Imagineering
- Theme: The Royal Anandapur Forest
- Length: 2,000 ft (610 m)
- Duration: About 10:00

The Maharajah Jungle Trek is a themed wildlife trail attraction at Disney's Animal Kingdom theme park at the Walt Disney World Resort in Bay Lake, Florida. It is in the Asia themed land, the Kingdom of Anandapur. It shares this area with the Kali River Rapids white water raft ride and the Expedition Everest runaway train rollercoaster.

== Story ==
The trail is themed as if it had once been the hunting grounds for a wealthy maharajah who enclosed the forest to allow for easier hunting and then some time later died in a hunting accident. The themed storyline continues with subsequent maharajahs (including the original maharajah's bachelor brother) transforming the area into a nature preserve where the villagers live in harmony with the animals therein. These maharajahs are memorialized on the walls of the tiger enclosure. The forest was, at one point, also run by imperial British visitors, as evidenced in the Western spelling on the sign at the entrance to the Jungle Trek, which reads "Royal Anandapoor Forest". The Asian animals include tigers, Komodo dragons, blackbucks, flying foxes, water buffaloes, lion-tailed macaques, and various Asian birds. When their occupation of southern Asia ended, the British turned the forest over to the villagers of Anandapur, whom you encounter as you walk through the jungle. The trail's storyline also includes an homage to the founder of the Kingdom of Anandapur, Anantah, in the form of a tomb and sarcophagus situated at the entrance to the Jungle Trek's aviary.

== Animal encounters ==
On the Maharajah Jungle Trek one may see:

- Komodo dragon
- Lion-tailed macaque
- Black tree monitor
- Malayan flying fox
- Prehensile-tailed skink
- Sumatran tiger (previously held Bengal tiger)
- Blackbuck
- Swan goose
- Water buffalo
- Bar-headed goose
- Sarus crane

=== Aviary ===
- Metallic starling
- Masked lapwing
- Falcated teal
- Grey-capped emerald dove
- Great argus
- Cotton pygmy goose
- Mindanao bleeding-heart
- Nicobar pigeon
- Pied imperial pigeon
- Victoria crowned pigeon
- Black-collared starling
- Golden-crested myna
- Crested wood partridge
- Blue-crowned laughingthrush
- White-rumped shama
- Hooded pitta
- Asian fairy-bluebird

== History ==
In 2015, three water buffalo named Rose, Dorothy and Blanche, were added to the attraction. Their names were inspired by the TV show The Golden Girls. A new pool was constructed specifically for these animals.

In 2017, Jeda and Anala, the first Sumatran tiger cubs ever born at Animal Kingdom were featured here for public viewing.
