= Primeval Whirl =

Defunct wild mouse roller coaster

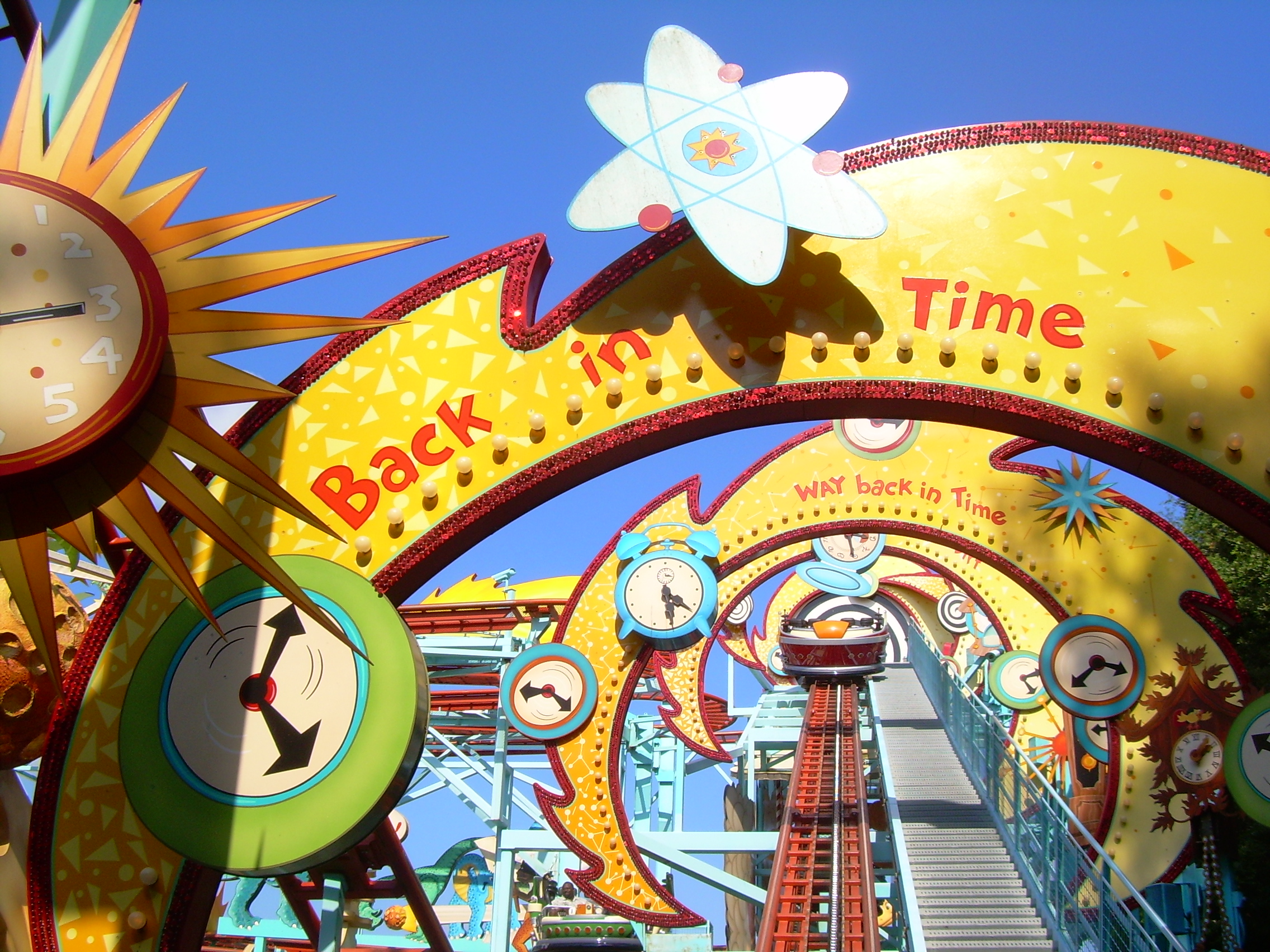
- Car going up chain lift

Disney's Animal Kingdom
- Location: Disney's Animal Kingdom
- Park section: DinoLand U.S.A. - Chester & Hester's Dino-Rama
- Coordinates: 28°21′23.05″N 81°35′15.8″W
- Status: Removed
- Opening date: March 31, 2002
- Closing date: March 12, 2020
- Replaced by: Antonio's Fiesta de Encanto (Tropical Americas)

General statistics
- Type: Steel – Spinning – Wild Mouse
- Manufacturer: Reverchon Industries
- Designer: Walt Disney Imagineering
- Model: Spinning Coaster
- Track layout: Wild Mouse
- Lift/launch system: Chain lift hill
- Height: 42.7 ft (13.0 m)
- Length: 1,377.9 ft (420.0 m)
- Speed: 29.1 mph (46.8 km/h)
- Inversions: 0
- Duration: 1:30
- Capacity: 900 riders per hour
- G-force: 2.5
- Height restriction: 48 in (122 cm)
- Trains: 13 trains with a single car; riders arranged 4 across in a single row for a total of 4 riders per train
- Fastpass+ Was available
- Primeval Whirl at RCDB

Primeval Whirl was a steel wild mouse roller coaster at Disney's Animal Kingdom at the Walt Disney World Resort. The ride was a spinning roller coaster purchased from Reverchon Industries. The ride was part of Chester and Hester's Dino-Rama, which was itself part of DinoLand U.S.A. It was a roller coaster in the "Mild But Wild Thrills" category. It had cars that spun in circles while traveling on tracks, permitting the ride experience to vary greatly each time it is ridden. The ride featured 13 cars, each seating up to 4 riders. Disney demolished the ride track and a majority of the buildings used for the ride in late 2021.

Similar to Space Mountain at the Magic Kingdom, Primeval Whirl was actually two roller coasters facing opposite directions. Unlike Space Mountain, both tracks had an identical layout instead of the mirrored track.

== History ==
The original plan for DinoLand U.S.A. was to include a wooden roller coaster named The Excavator. Its concept would utilize mine cart style train cars in a ride through the old work site where, in the backstory for the land, the very first bones were found in Diggs County. Warning signs would flank the entry as guests boarded what could be assumed was an attraction set up by the grad students that ran the nearby dig site. During the ride, guests would pass through dinosaur bones and around the centerpiece for this out-of-control wooden roller coaster: an old excavator that the college kids altered to look like a dinosaur, giving the attraction its name. The Excavator was cancelled due to budget cuts after the failure of Disneyland Paris, formerly known as Euro Disney. Officials revisited the idea of a mine train roller coaster for Expedition Everest, which would open in 2006.

On September 29, 2000, Disney announced that they would be adding new attractions to their Magic Kingdom and Animal Kingdom parks. The Magic Kingdom would be getting The Magic Carpets of Aladdin, a family ride based on the 1992 film Aladdin. Disney's Animal Kingdom would be receiving Chester and Hester's Dino-Rama, which would be located in the DinoLand U.S.A. area. The new section would feature several carnival games and a snack trailer on an old asphalt parking lot across from a gas station and store. Plus, this area would include two new rides, which were Primeval Whirl and TriceraTop Spin. TriceraTop Spin would be similar to The Magic Carpets of Aladdin, while Primeval Whirl would be a dual track spinning Wild Mouse roller coaster built by Reverchon Industries.

Primeval Whirl officially opened to the public on March 31, 2002. It was the first roller coaster to open at Disney's Animal Kingdom.

On June 17, 2019, the ride was reduced to seasonal operation, and later in September, park officials stated that the attraction would only be operating on a seasonal basis. On July 16, 2020, officials confirmed that the attraction would not re-open after various speculation, since the park was temporarily closed, and the ride was permanently closed on March 12, 2020, due to the COVID-19 pandemic. After the announcement, the ride vehicles were removed from the track.

In September 2021, construction walls were installed in the surrounding area of the attraction. Demolition of the ride began that same month on September 22 with the removal of track sections. The entrance sign was taken down a few days later. By November, both tracks were demolished and the site was mostly cleared.

In August 2024, it was announced at the D23 fan event that the area that the ride was located in, DinoLand U.S.A., would be replaced with a new land called Tropical Americas, which is scheduled to open in 2027.

== Ride ==
The ride was themed to time travel and to the meteor which was believed to have caused the extinction of the dinosaurs. This gave the coaster a storyline very similar to that of Dinosaur, the dark ride that was nearby.

== Reception ==
Primeval Whirl received mixed reviews from guests, as some praised the theming and dual track ride experience, but others criticized it as not being up to Disney standards.

== Incidents ==
On November 29, 2007, a Disney employee, Karen Price, aged 63, died in a hospital after falling from the Primeval Whirl ride platform and hitting her head. Four months later, Disney announced it was adding sensors that would detect if a cast member entered into areas that are off-limits and stop the movement of the ride vehicles in the immediate area.

On March 14, 2011, Russell Sherry Roscoe, aged 52, died after suffering from head trauma while working on a dip on the ride the previous day.

== See also ==
- Dinosaur
