= Gorilla Falls Exploration Trail =

Walkway at Disney's Animal Kingdom

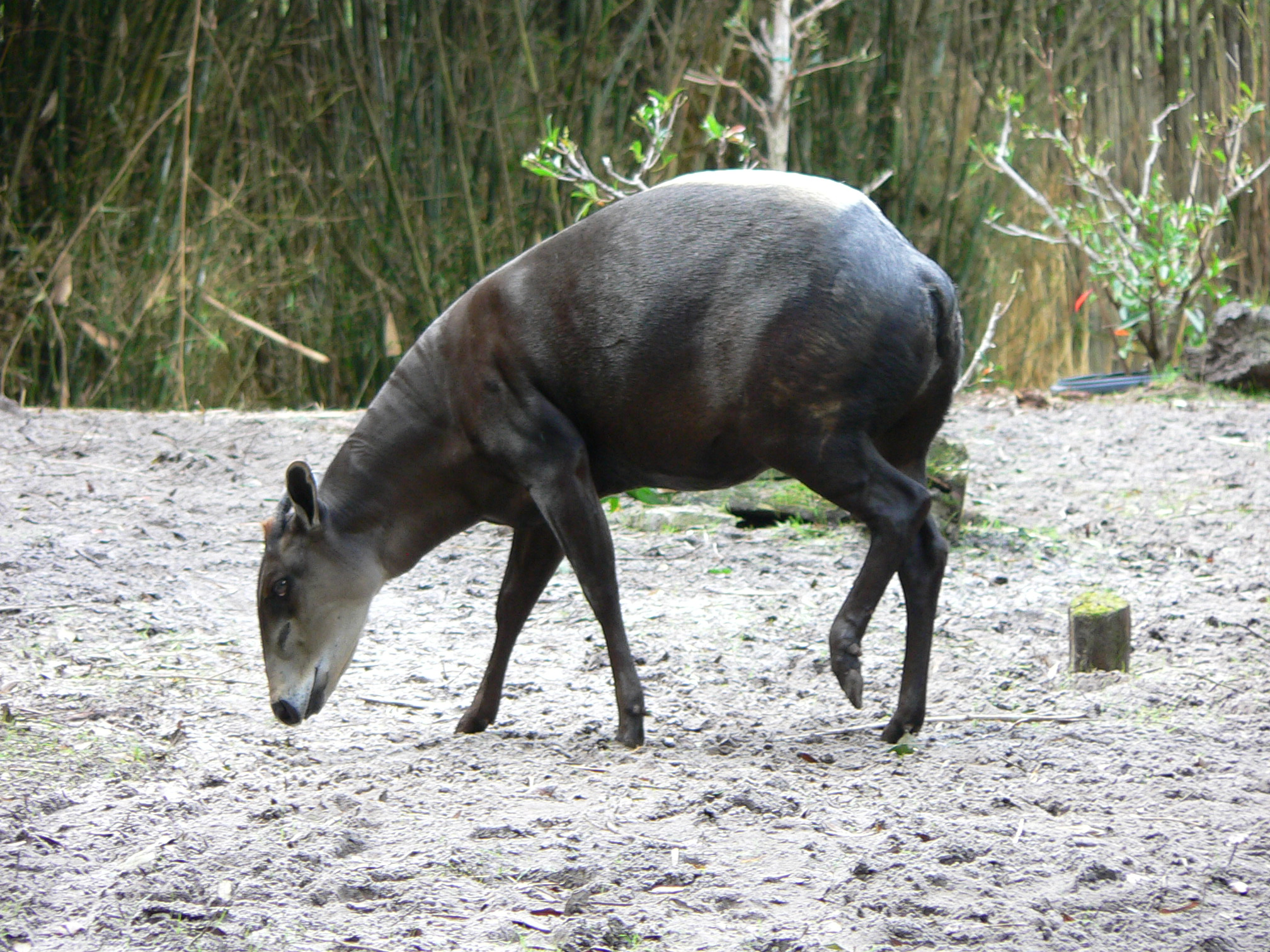
- Formerly known as Pangani Forest Exploration Trail from August 1998-May 2016

Disney's Animal Kingdom
- Area: Africa
- Coordinates: 28°21′36.97″N 81°35′31.72″W
- Status: Operating
- Opening date: April 22, 1998

Ride statistics
- Attraction type: Trail
- Designer: Walt Disney Imagineering
- Theme: African Rainforest
- Stations: 2
- Animals: Primates
- Animal Viewing Locations: 4
- Observing Stations: 3
- Main animal: Western lowland gorilla
- Other animals: Black and white colobus monkey, meerkat, yellow-backed duiker, okapi, birds, gerenuk
- Wheelchair accessible

The Gorilla Falls Exploration Trail (formerly known as Pangani Forest Exploration Trail from August 1998 to May 2016) is a walkway next to Kilimanjaro Safaris at the Disney's Animal Kingdom in the Walt Disney World Resort, Florida, from which visitors can see African animals. It is about three-eighths of a mile in length. There are "research students" positioned at most locations to give information about the animals and answer questions.

The attraction originally opened on April 22, 1998 as Gorilla Falls Exploration Trail, but the name was changed to Pangani Forest Exploration Trail in August 1998. The attraction reverted to its original name on May 27, 2016.

== Animals ==
- Angolan black-and-white colobus
- Okapi
- Arabian spiny mouse
- Naked mole-rat
- Pancake tortoise
- Kenyan sand boa
- Ball python
- African bullfrog
- Angolan python
- Hippopotamus
- Grevy's zebra
- Meerkat
- Western lowland gorilla

=== Aviary ===
- Red-and-yellow barbet
- Hammerkop
- Great blue turaco
- Amethyst starling
- Northern carmine bee-eater
- Racket-tailed roller
- Blue-bellied roller
- African olive pigeon
- White-headed buffalo weaver
- Tambourine dove
- Purple glossy starling
- Taveta golden weaver
- Green woodhoopoe
- Snowy-crowned robin-chat
- Marbled teal
- African pygmy goose
- Bruce's green pigeon
- African jacana
- Black-cheeked lovebird

=== Fish ===
- Lake Victoria cichlid
