= Disney's Animal Kingdom =

Theme park at Walt Disney World

Disney's Animal Kingdom Theme Park

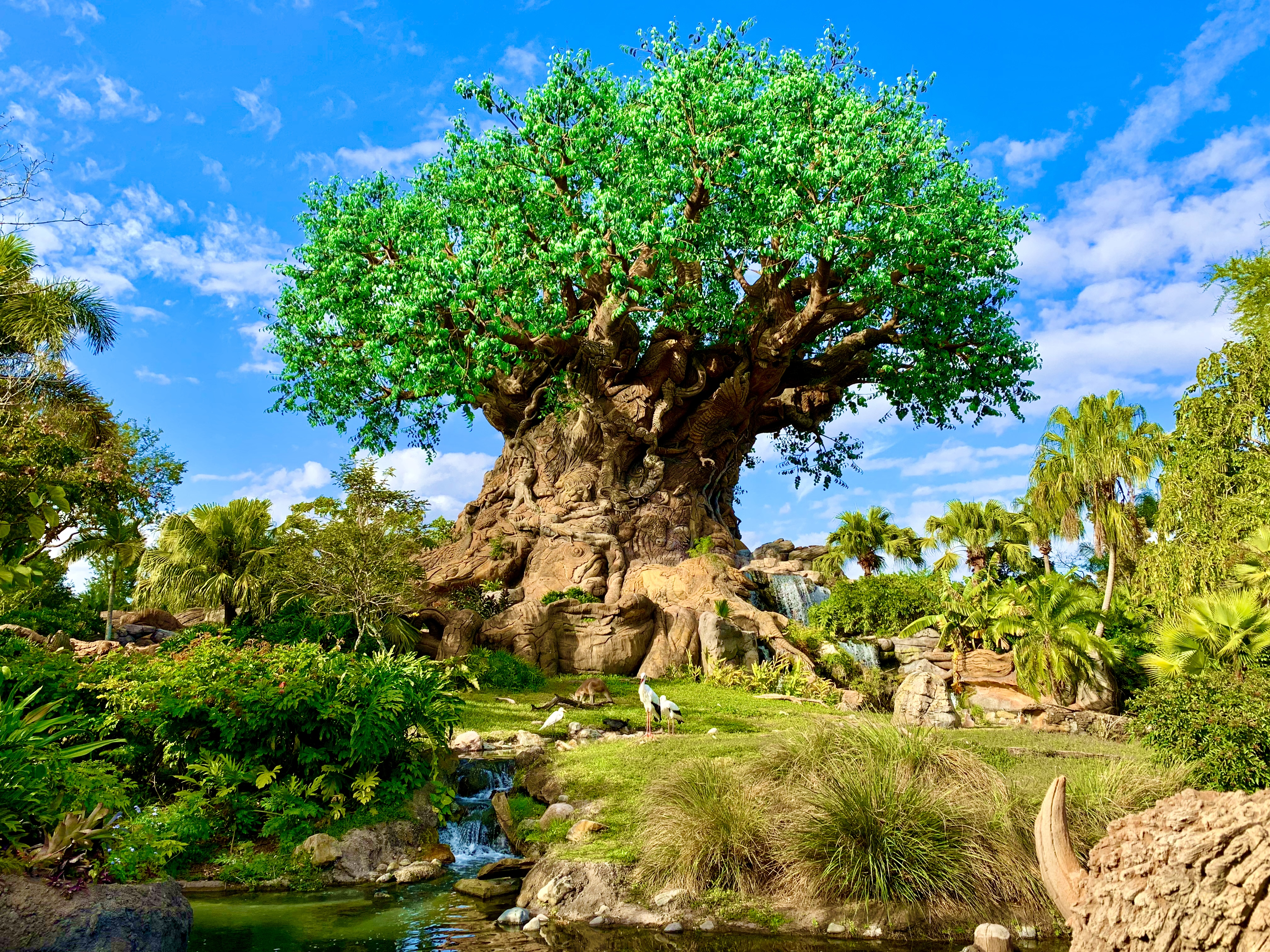
- The Tree of Life, the icon of Animal Kingdom
- Interactive map of Disney's Animal Kingdom; Theme Park
- Location: Walt Disney World, Bay Lake, Florida, United States
- Coordinates: 28°21′29″N 81°35′24″W
- Status: Operating
- Opened: April 22, 1998; 28 years ago
- Owner: Disney Experiences (The Walt Disney Company)
- Operated by: Walt Disney World; Key people: Maryann Smith (VP); Dr. Mark Penning (VP, Animal Sciences); Kristen Stalker (GM, Operations)
- Theme: Natural world
- Operating season: Year-round
- Attendance: 8.782 million (2025)
- Website: Animal Kingdom

Disney's Animal Kingdom Theme Park is a zoological theme park at Walt Disney World Resort in Bay Lake, Florida, near Orlando. Owned and operated by the Walt Disney Company through its Experiences division, it was the largest theme park in the world upon opening, covering 580 acres (230 ha). The park is themed around the natural world through both real-life and imagined representations of animals and locations.

Disney's Animal Kingdom distinguishes itself from other Walt Disney World theme parks by featuring hundreds of live animal exhibits alongside traditional theme park elements. The park is located on the western edge of the resort and is isolated from the other theme parks and properties to minimize external disruptions to the animals; as a result, the park does not feature nighttime fireworks shows that would otherwise disturb the animals. In efforts to be more eco-friendly, the park uses biodegradable paper straws and prohibits plastic straws, lids, and balloons. Disney's Animal Kingdom is accredited by the Association of Zoos and Aquariums and the World Association of Zoos and Aquariums, indicating they have met or exceeded the standards in animal welfare, education, conservation, and research.

In 2025, the park hosted 8.782 million guests, making it the 15th-most-visited theme park in the world. It is the most-visited zoo in the world as of 2019. The park's icon is the Tree of Life, a 145-foot-tall (44 m), 50-foot-wide (15 m) artificial baobab tree.

== History ==
=== Planning and construction ===
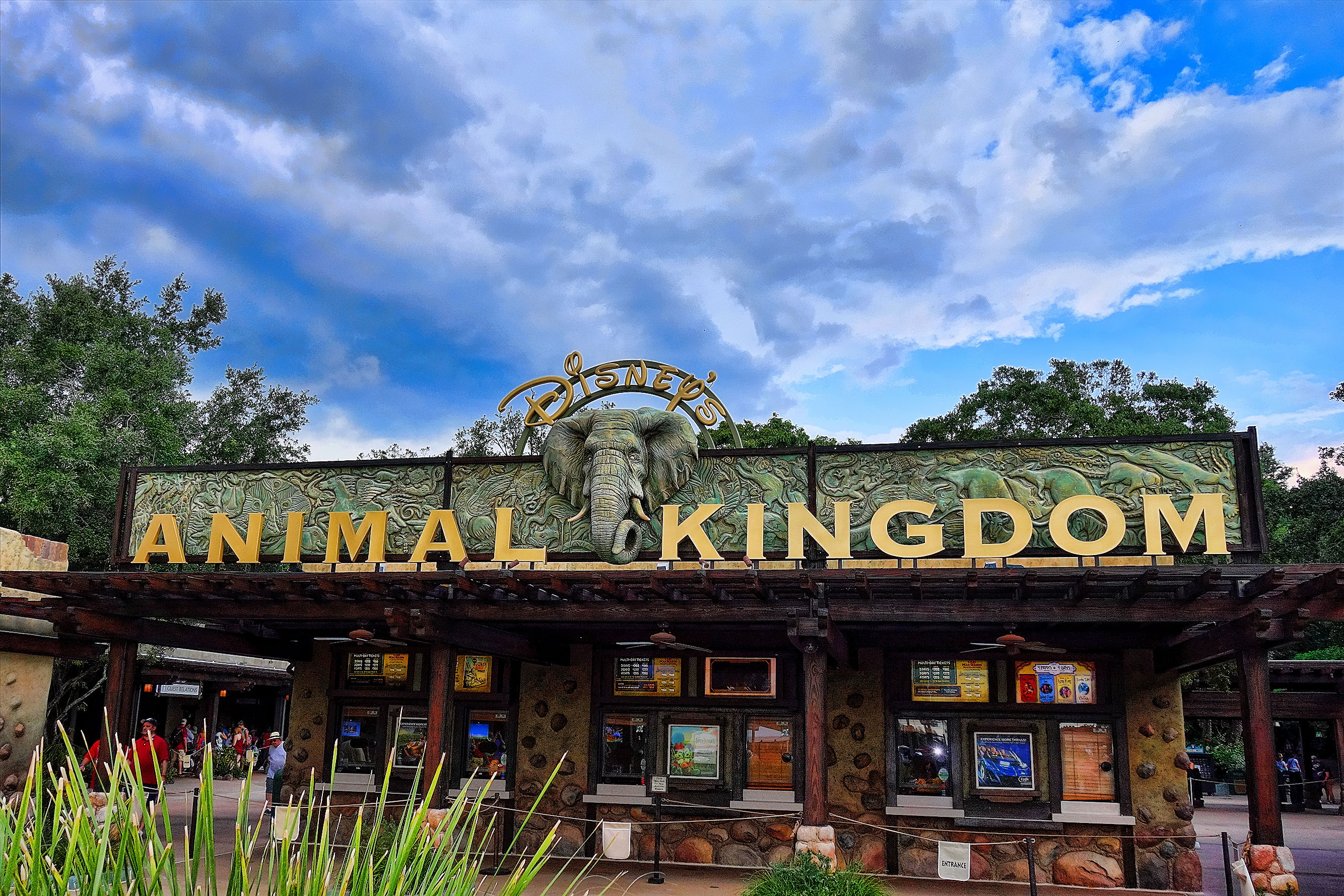
Entrance area

Disney began planning a new park shortly after the opening of Disney-MGM Studios in 1989. Animal Kingdom was the brainchild of Imagineer Joe Rohde, who had previously designed the Adventurers Club at Pleasure Island. When presenting the idea of the new animal-themed park, Rohde brought a 400-pound (180 kg) Bengal tiger into the meeting with Disney CEO Michael Eisner. Originally slated as Disney's "Wild Animal Kingdom," Disney announced plans for the construction of the park in 1995 at an estimated cost of $600-$800 million. To design the theme park, Disney Imagineers traveled to Africa and Asia to study the landscapes and wildlife.

In July 1996, construction was underway on the animal holding facilities, the installation of trees, shrubs, and grasses to shape the park's African Savanna-inspired landscape. Disney Imagineers collected seeds from 37 countries to be used for the plants and grasses in the park. The landscaping efforts included spreading four million cubic yards of dirt, planting 40,000 mature trees (a mix of real Savanna species and artificial Baobab trees), constructing 60 miles (97 km) of underground utilities, and construction of various waterways, and structures built by over 2,600 construction workers. Many buildings contained thatched roofs assembled by Zulu workers from South Africa. About 1,500 hand-painted wooden horses were crafted in Bali under Disney supervision. Parts of the park were designed to have an aged appearance, with artificial potholes in the safari roads and boats peppered with dents and rust.

Most of the park's animals were acquired in 1997 during the fall; they were held at a rented holding facility in northern Florida for quarantine and observation. Disney hired staff from 69 zoos around the United States to care for the animals.

=== Operation ===
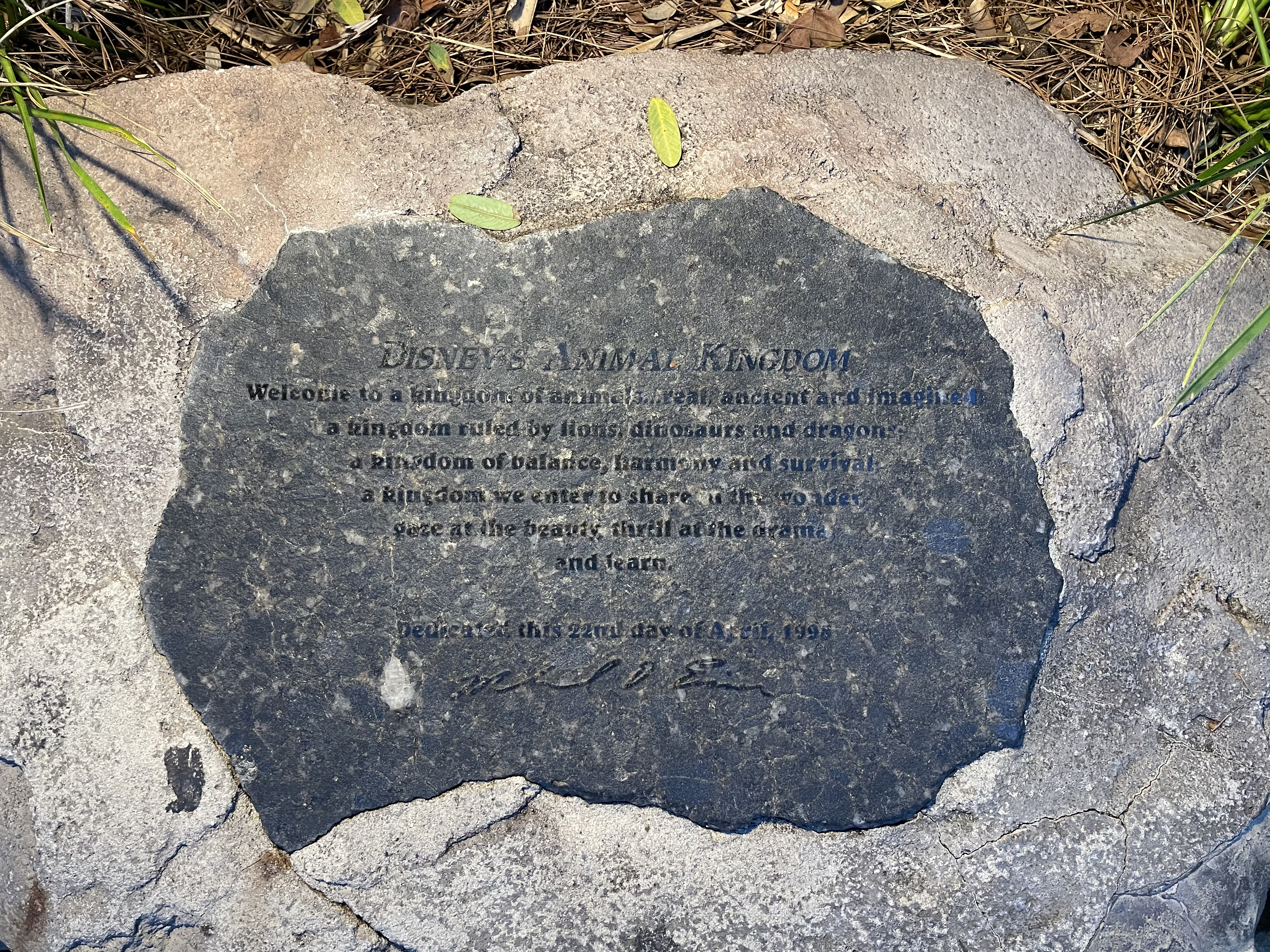
Dedication plaque from the opening of the park

The park opened to the public on April 22, 1998. Initial marketing billed the park as "a new species of theme park". Several marketing events surrounded the day. ABC aired a two-hour prime time special about the making of Animal Kingdom, as part of its The Wonderful World of Disney anthology series. Eisner and Disney Vice Chairman Roy Disney hosted an opening day party for 14,000 corporate partners, travel agents, and media figures, which included celebrities such as Michael J. Fox, Drew Carey, Stevie Wonder, David Copperfield, and Jane Goodall. Broadcasts of Good Morning America, Today and Live with Regis and Kathie Lee aired live from the park on April 22.

In 2011, Disney announced a major expansion to the park, Pandora - The World of Avatar, a joint venture with director James Cameron and his production company, Lightstorm Entertainment, with the intention of transforming Animal Kingdom into a full-day operation with added attraction capacity and nighttime experiences. Construction on the area began on January 10, 2014, and the area opened to the public on May 27, 2017.

The park was closed from March 16 to July 11, 2020, due to the COVID-19 pandemic in Florida.

In September 2023, it was announced at Destination D23 that DinoLand U.S.A. would be replaced with a new area inspired by the American tropics, and It's Tough to Be a Bug! would be succeeded by a Zootopia-themed film in the Tree of Life Theater.

In August 2024, it was confirmed that It's Tough to Be a Bug! show would be replaced by the new show Zootopia: Better Zoogether in the Tree of Life Theater, opening in the winter of 2025, and DinoLand U.S.A. would be replaced by a new Tropical Americas land, set in the fictional town of Pueblo Esperanza, featuring Encanto and Indiana Jones-themed attractions with completion expected by 2027.

In October 2024, the closing date of DinoLand, U.S.A. was pushed to 2025. The first phase of the closure of DinoLand, U.S.A. became effective on January 13, 2025, with the closure of the subsection Chester & Hester's Dino-Rama, including TriceraTop Spin, Fossil Fun Games, and Chester & Hester's Dinosaur Treasures. In February 2025, it was announced that It's Tough to Be a Bug! would close on March 16, 2025.

In March 2025, it was announced that Zootopia: Better Zoogether! would open on November 7, 2025, and would be based on the 2016 movie Zootopia and its 2025 sequel, Zootopia 2, which was released in theaters a few weeks after the show on November 26, 2025. In June 2025, it was announced that the second phase of the closure of DinoLand, U.S.A. became effective on September 1, 2025, including The Boneyard.

In September 2025, it was announced that the third and final phase of DinoLand, U.S.A. will be closed permanently, effective February 2, 2026, including the Dino Institute, and more.

In December 2025, it was announced that "Bluey's Wild World", based on the Australian television series Bluey would come to the park on May 26, 2026, with Bluey and Bingo debuting at Conservation Station.

At the D23 fan event in August 2026, it was revealed that the Encanto and Indiana Jones rides will be called Antonio's Fiesta de Encanto and Indiana Jones and the Myth of the Jade Serpent, respectively, and that the new carousel for Tropical Americas will be called El Carrusel de los Animalitos. In addition, it was announced that Yeti animatronic inside Expedition Everest will be repaired.

== Park layout and attractions ==
Disney's Animal Kingdom is divided into six themed areas. The park's Discovery River separates Discovery Island from the other lands. The park is home to approximately 2000 animals representing around 200 species.

=== Oasis ===
Oasis is the park's logistic equivalent to Main Street U.S.A. and provides the transition from the park's entrance to the world of animals. The main paths feature animal exhibits and dense vegetation and trees lead deeper into the park and then onto Discovery Island. Between the parking lot and the Oasis sits a Rainforest Cafe, which can be entered from both inside and outside the ticketed area.

=== Discovery Island ===
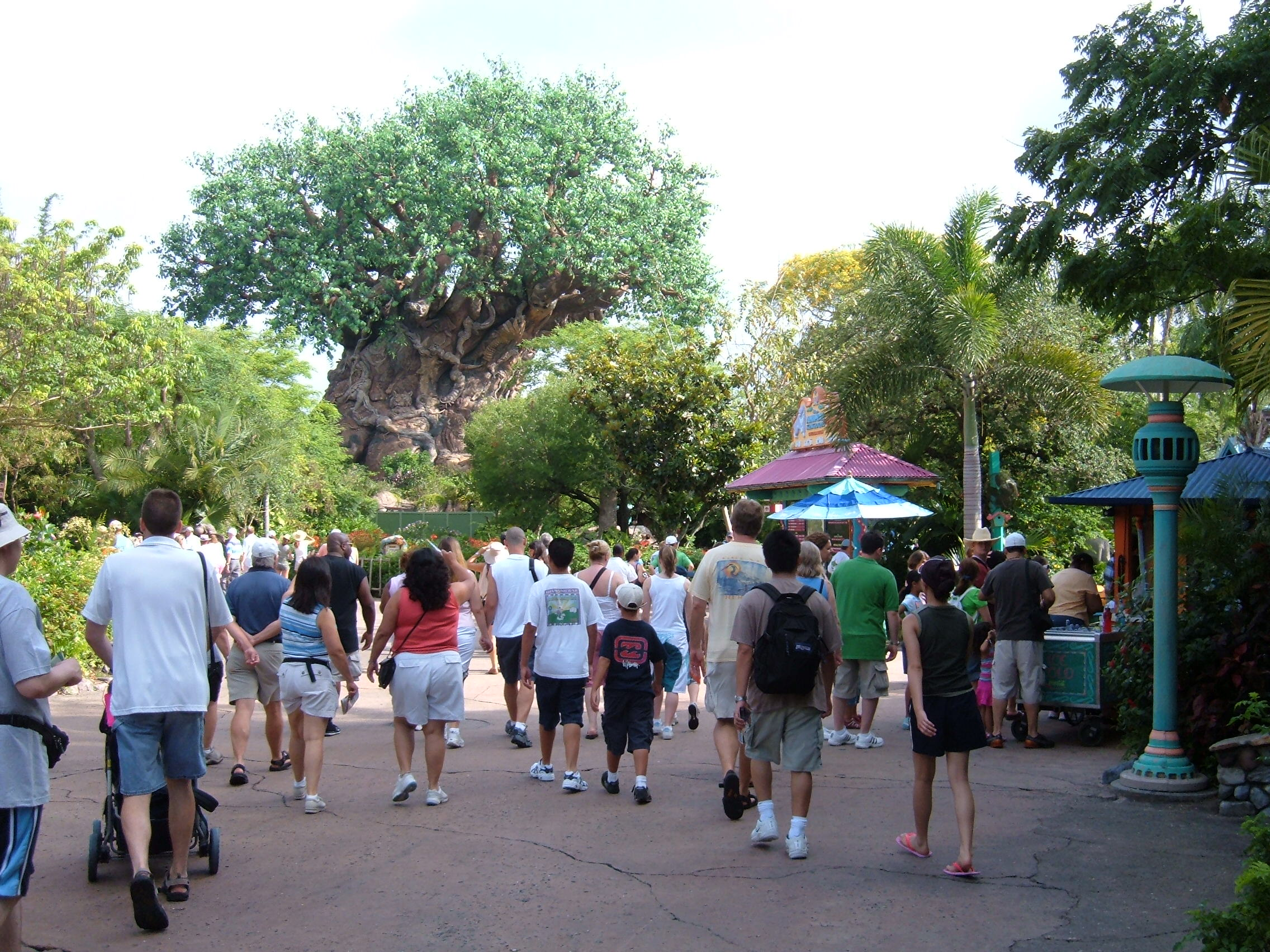
Discovery Island

Discovery Island is located at the center of the park and is an island within the park's Discovery River waterway. It serves as the "central hub" connecting the other sections of the park by bridges, with the exception of Rafiki's Planet Watch. It was originally called Safari Village, as Discovery Island was the name for the small zoological park located in Walt Disney World's Bay Lake but was renamed after that area, which closed in 1999.

The Tree of Life, the park's sculpted, man-made baobab tree, is located in this section and is surrounded by trails and animal enclosures. Inside the Tree of Life theater is Zootopia: Better Zoogether!, a 4D film inspired by Zootopia. The park's largest gift shops and two of its major restaurants are on Discovery Island.

=== Pandora – The World of Avatar ===
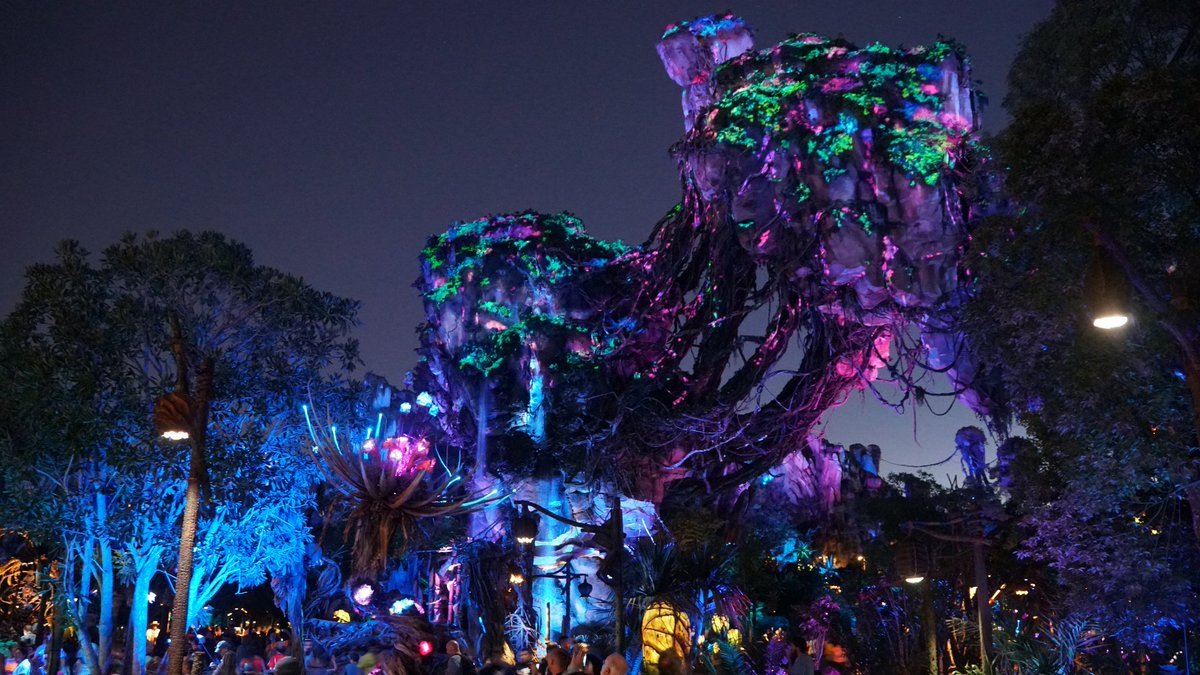
Pandora – The World of Avatar illuminated during the night

Pandora – The World of Avatar is themed to the fictional habitable exomoon, Pandora, from James Cameron's Avatar and devoted to the many extraterrestrial fauna and flora that inhabit it. The land's marquee attraction is Avatar Flight of Passage, a 3D flying thrill simulator that mimics an exhilarating flight on a banshee across the Pandoran landscape. Another attraction, the Na'vi River Journey, is a dark boat ride through Pandora's bioluminescent rainforests. The area opened on May 27, 2017.

=== Africa ===
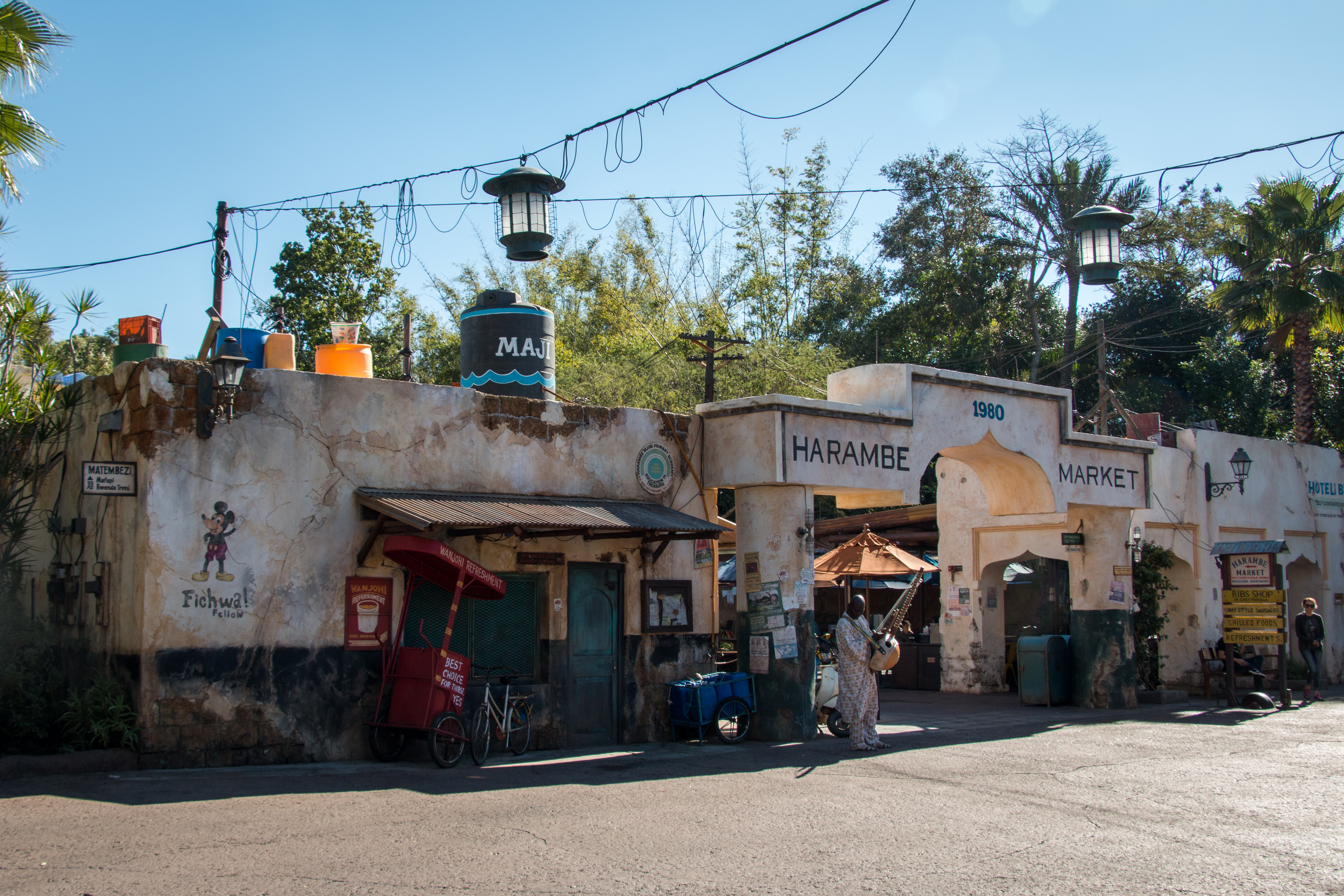
The village of Harambe in Africa.

Africa, set in the fictional east African port village of Harambe (not to be confused with the gorilla of the same name), resembles the local villages found in Kenya, Tanzania, and Uganda. Some snippets from Africa that were duplicated by the Disney Imagineers included a fortress that was found in Zanzibar, and a water-stained, crumbling old building that was found in Kenya. Harambe includes a "hotel”, restaurants, an outdoor bar with live entertainment, and different marketplaces.

The village is the namesake of the Harambe Wildlife Preserve, the fictional home of the area's main attraction, Kilimanjaro Safaris. Prior to boarding, the attraction's queue takes you through the Safari Booking Office, along with a small paddock where radiated tortoises and black crowned cranes can be seen while waiting. Guests then climb aboard an open-sided safari vehicle for an expedition to see African species in several large field enclosures, replicating the African savannas, rivers and rocky hills. The safari features the okapi, greater kudu, saddle-billed stork, bongo, black and southern white rhinoceros, hippopotamus, pink-backed pelican, Nile crocodile, Masai giraffe, blue wildebeest, springbok, Ankole cattle, African wild dog, common eland, waterbuck, sable antelope, African bush elephant, mandrill, greater flamingo, Hartmann's mountain zebra, common ostrich, cheetah, African lion, common warthog, and Nigerian dwarf goats.

On the adjacent Gorilla Falls Exploration Trail, visitors trek into the forest to see animals such as the Western lowland gorilla, Angolan colobus, okapi, yellow-backed duiker, Grévy's zebra, meerkat, and naked mole-rat, as well as a walkthrough aviary. On the western side of the Africa area is the Harambe Theater, which is home to the Festival of the Lion King, a live stage show based on Disney Animation's 1994 film, The Lion King.

=== Conservation Station ===
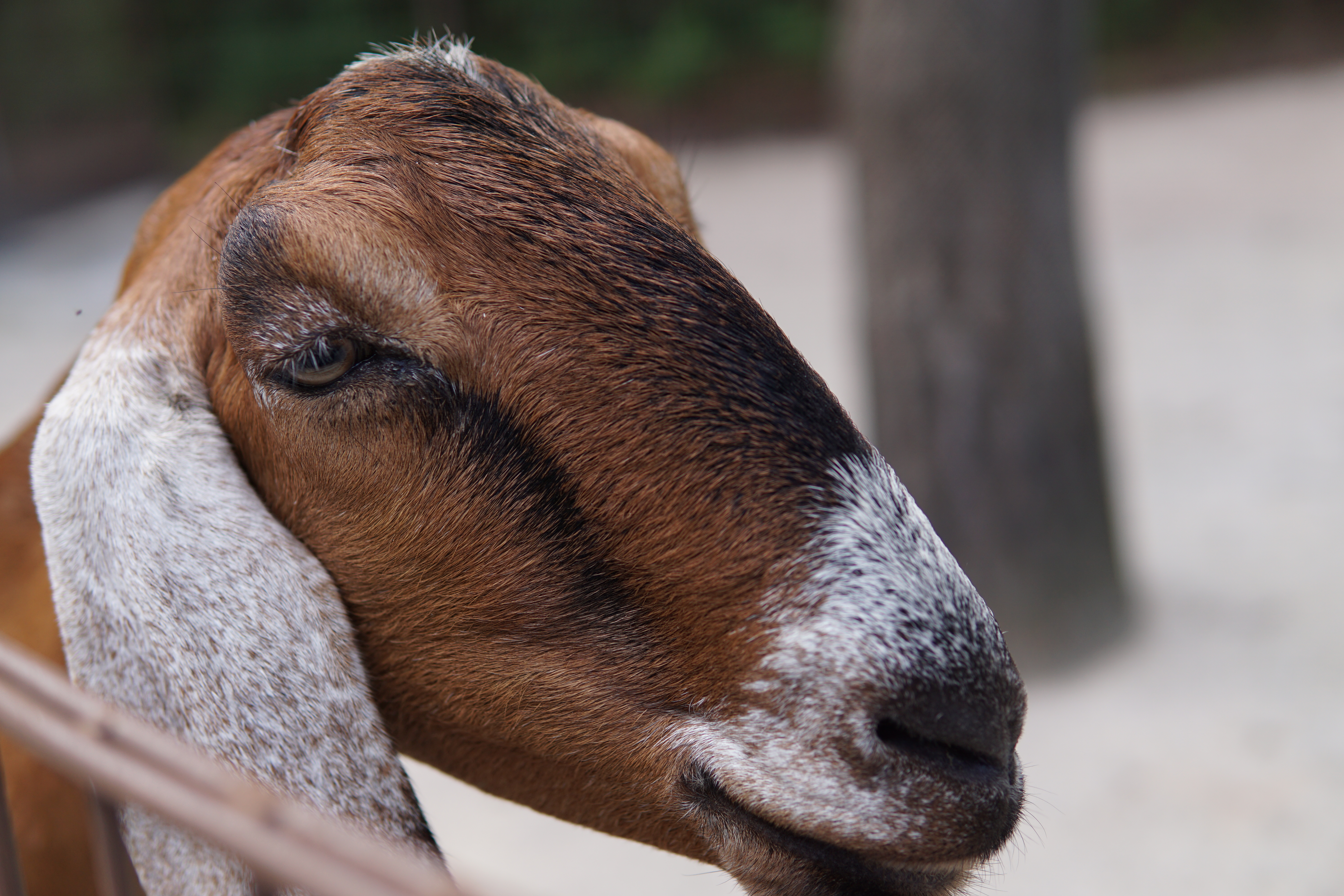
Anglo-Nubian goat at the Affection Section petting zoo in 2019

Conservation Station is the only section of the park not connected to Discovery Island; it connects only to Africa. Guests board the 3 ft (914 mm) narrow-gauge Wildlife Express Train for the short trip to and from the area, which consists of three sub-areas.

Inside Conservation Station, it showcases the various conservation efforts supported by the Walt Disney Company. It also gives a behind-the-scenes glimpse into Disney's Animal Kingdom's animal care facilities, including a veterinary examination room complete with a two-way communications system so the veterinary staff can answer guest questions. From 2019 to 2026, The Animation Experience at Conservation Station was also present in this location.

Nearby was the Affection Section, an outdoor petting zoo that featured domesticated animals like goats, sheep, cattle, pigs, donkeys, and alpacas. In May 2026, it was renamed to Jumping Junction, a walkthrough habitat which introduced animals like wallabies and kangaroos to this section of the park.

Opening with the park in 1998, this section originally opened under the name "Conservation Station" before being renamed in late 2000 to "Rafiki's Planet Watch". Since 2026, the latter name was changed back to Conservation Station for the "Bluey's Wild World" experience, based on the Australian television series Bluey.

=== Asia ===
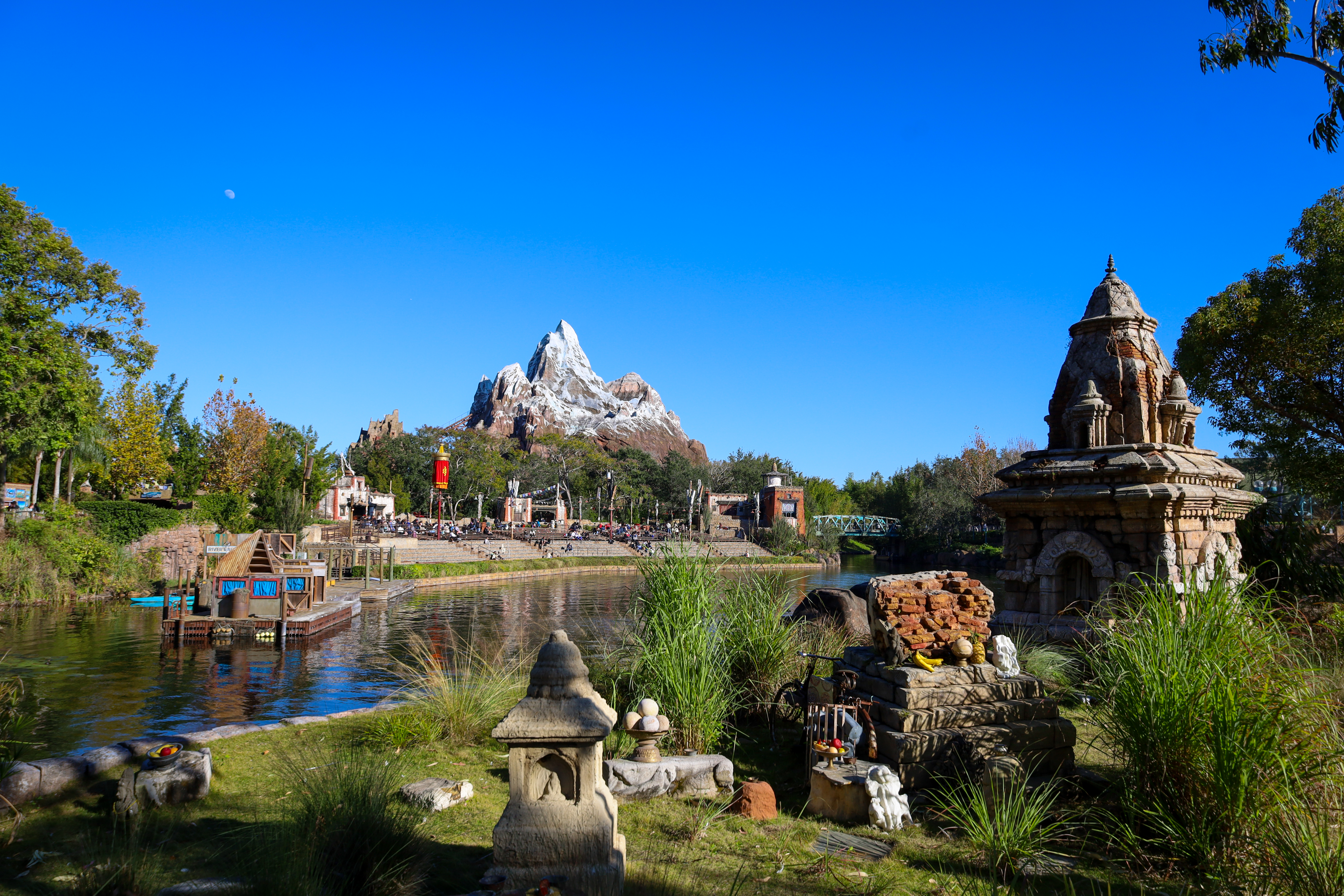
Expedition Everest and surrounding panorama in Asia.

Asia, set in the fictional kingdom of Anandapur, evokes the traits of Cambodia, Bhutan, India, Indonesia, Mongolia, Nepal, Thailand and Tibet, China. The first expansion area added to Disney's Animal Kingdom in 1999, Anandapur translates to "place of many delights" in Sanskrit. According to the park's fictional history, Anandapur was established as a royal hunting preserve in 1544. Asia contains both the riverside village of Anandapur and Serka Zong, which is set in the foothills of the Himalayas.

The visual focal point of Asia is Expedition Everest, a steel roller coaster ride through a forbidden Himalayan mountain guarded by the elusive Yeti. Nearby is Kali River Rapids, a river rapids ride. The Maharajah Jungle Trek leads guests through the forests and ruins outside the village, which are home to species such as the water buffalo, bar-headed goose, Sumatran tiger, blackbuck, Sarus crane, swan goose, lion-tailed macaque, Malayan flying fox, Komodo dragon and over 50 bird species. In the Anandapur Theatre, Feathered Friends in Flight is a live bird show featuring birds such as the black crowned crane and bald eagle. At the eastern edge of Asia is the Theater in the Wild, which hosts Finding Nemo: The Big Blue... and Beyond!, a live-action puppet musical stage show based on the story of Pixar's 2003 film Finding Nemo.

== Former areas ==
=== DinoLand U.S.A. ===
DinoLand U.S.A. was set in the fictional American rural locale of Diggs County and was themed around dinosaurs and other extinct prehistoric life. The area was anchored by the Dino Institute, a palaeontological facility which was home to Dinosaur, a dark thrill ride loosely inspired by Disney Animation's 2000 film of the same name, featuring a trip through time to the Late Cretaceous. Just outside the institute was "Dino-Sue", a casting of a Tyrannosaurus rex fossil that is the most complete yet found. At the nearby Boneyard, there was a multi-leveled playground area with a Columbian mammoth fossil to be uncovered and a cast skeleton of a Brachiosaurus. Adjacent to the Institute and its surrounding facilities, was Chester and Hester's Dino-Rama, which recalled the many roadside attractions that were once scattered throughout the United States, being constructed by the owners of an old gas station hoping to take advantage of the tourism business the institute has brought in. The area featured Primeval Whirl, a steel Wild Mouse spinning roller coaster, the TriceraTop Spin aerial carousel ride, carnival games, and gift shops.

Like the other sections of Disney's Animal Kingdom, there were animals on display. These animals, such as the American crocodile, Red-legged seriema, Abdim's stork and Asian forest tortoise, were featured due to their evolutionary links to the age of the dinosaurs. The area was sponsored by McDonald's until 2009.

=== Camp Minnie-Mickey ===
Camp Minnie-Mickey was themed as a rustic summer camp in the American wilderness, built as a placeholder on the location where Beastly Kingdom was intended to be built. This section was a meet and greet with various Disney characters and was the original home of Festival of the Lion King as well as the show Pocahontas and her Forest Friends. The area closed on January 5, 2014, and was replaced by Pandora – The World of Avatar.

== Unbuilt area ==
=== Beastly Kingdom ===
When originally conceived, Disney's Animal Kingdom was to focus on three broad classifications of animals: those that exist in today's reality; those that did exist but are now extinct (i.e., dinosaurs); and those that only exist in the realm of fantasy such as unicorns and dragons. The original design for Animal Kingdom included a themed section called Beastly Kingdom, devoted to creatures of legend and mythology. During the final stages of planning of development, Eisner decided that either Beastly Kingdom or DinoLand U.S.A. would be built first because of budget cuts after the failure of Euro Disney (known today as Disneyland Paris) and the higher cost of the upkeep and care of the animals at the park. DinoLand U.S.A. was chosen first mostly because of its lower budget. Former imagineers who went to work on Universal Islands of Adventure used ideas that were similar to Beastly Kingdom. In 2000, Rohde said: "We had a vision and now it's become a placeholder. We have all kinds of ideas and not all of them fit with the theme of Beastly Kingdom. I'm not even convinced there will be a Beastly Kingdom."

== Restaurants and shops ==
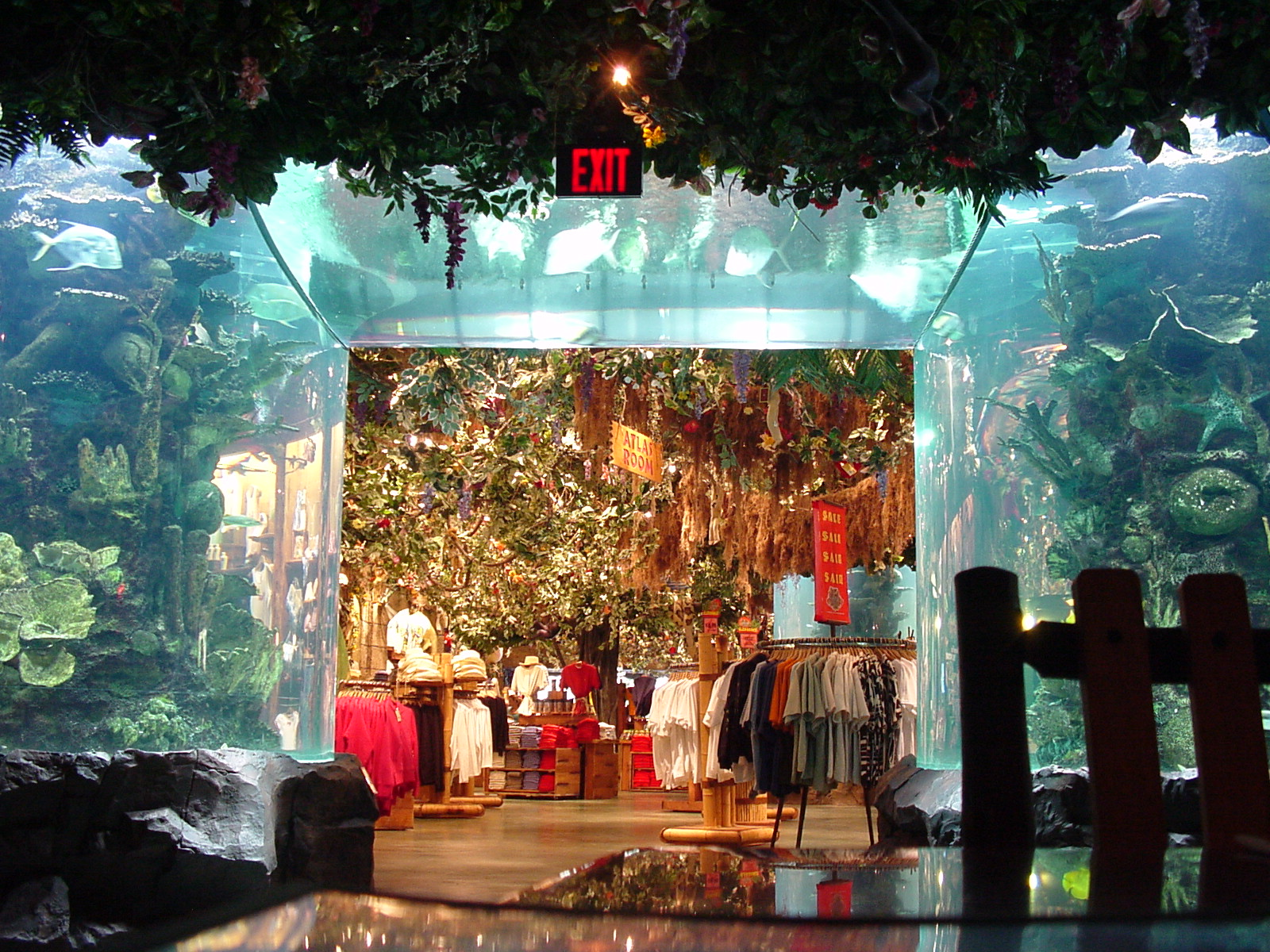
Rainforest Cafe with immersive aquarium viewing

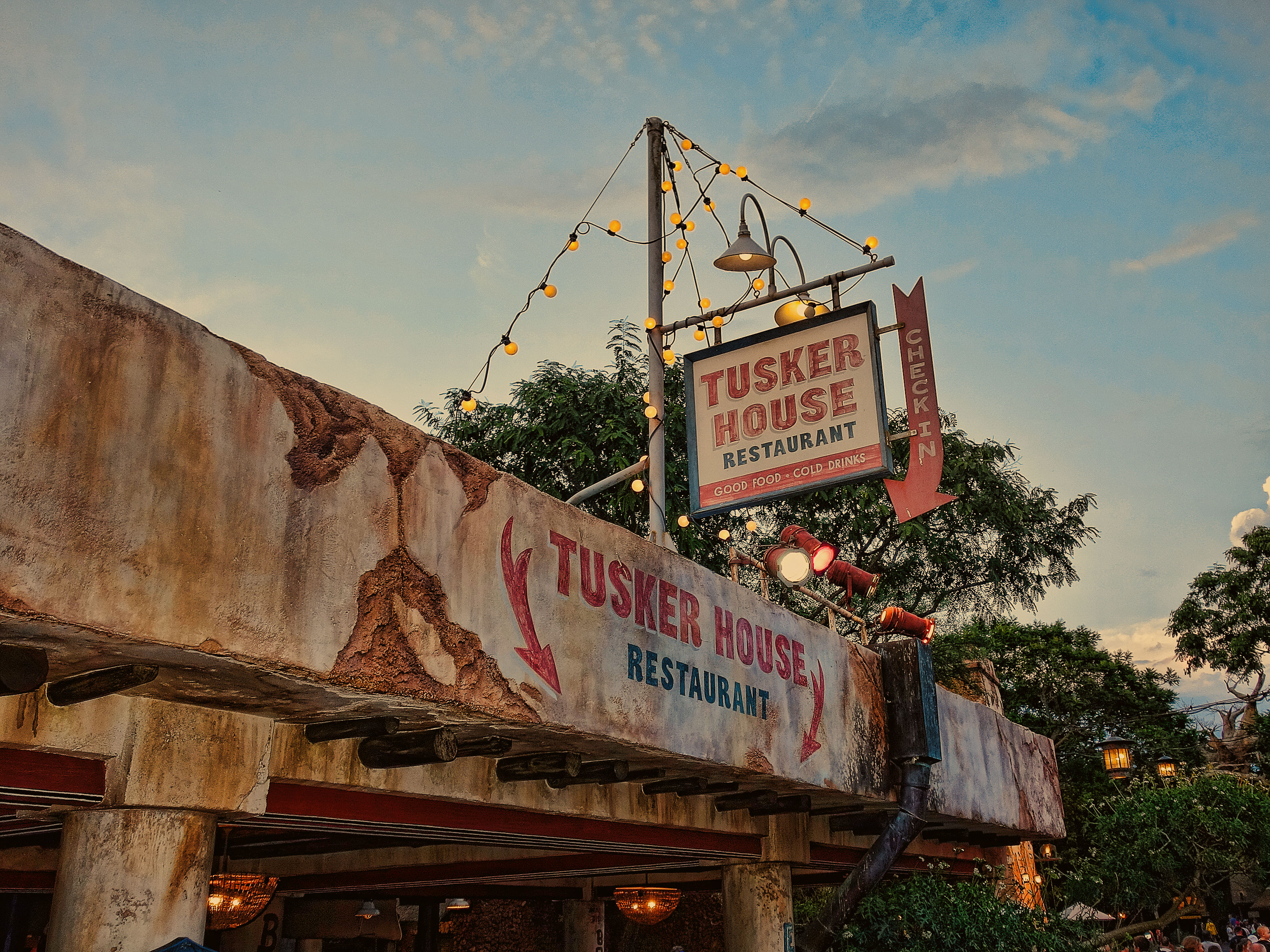
Tusker House in Africa section.

The park contains four table service restaurants:

- Rainforest Cafe, a themed restaurant chain operated by Landry's, located just outside the main entrance (also accessible from inside the park). It is one of the two Rainforest Cafes at the Walt Disney World Resort.
- Yak & Yeti, an Asian-themed restaurant located in the park's Asia section (also operated by Landry's).
- Tusker House, located in Africa and one of the park's original quick-service restaurants, was converted into a buffet restaurant.
- Tiffins, located on Discovery Island, features the themed Nomad Lounge adjacent to it.

There are seven quick-service restaurants located throughout the park:

- Flame Tree Barbecue on Discovery Island
- Pizzafari on Discovery Island
- Satu'li Canteen in Pandora – The World of Avatar
- Tamu Tamu Refreshments in Africa
- Harambe Market in Africa
- Yak & Yeti Local Foods Café in Asia

As with other Walt Disney World theme parks, Disney's Animal Kingdom has other locations and carts that offer snacks and beverages.

== Operations ==
The park typically closes earlier in the day than other parks in the Walt Disney World Resort; Animal Kingdom began to stay open through the evening on May 27, 2016.

Disney does not allow plastic straws, lids, or balloons to be used in the park, unlike the rest of the Disney parks. This is so that plastic does not inadvertently enter an animal's habitat and hurt them. Instead, the park uses biodegradable paper straws and offers lids for hot drinks only. The restrooms at Disney's Animal Kingdom all have doors at their entrances. This practice is in place so that, in the event of an animal escaping, guests are able to shelter safely inside.

== Conservation efforts ==
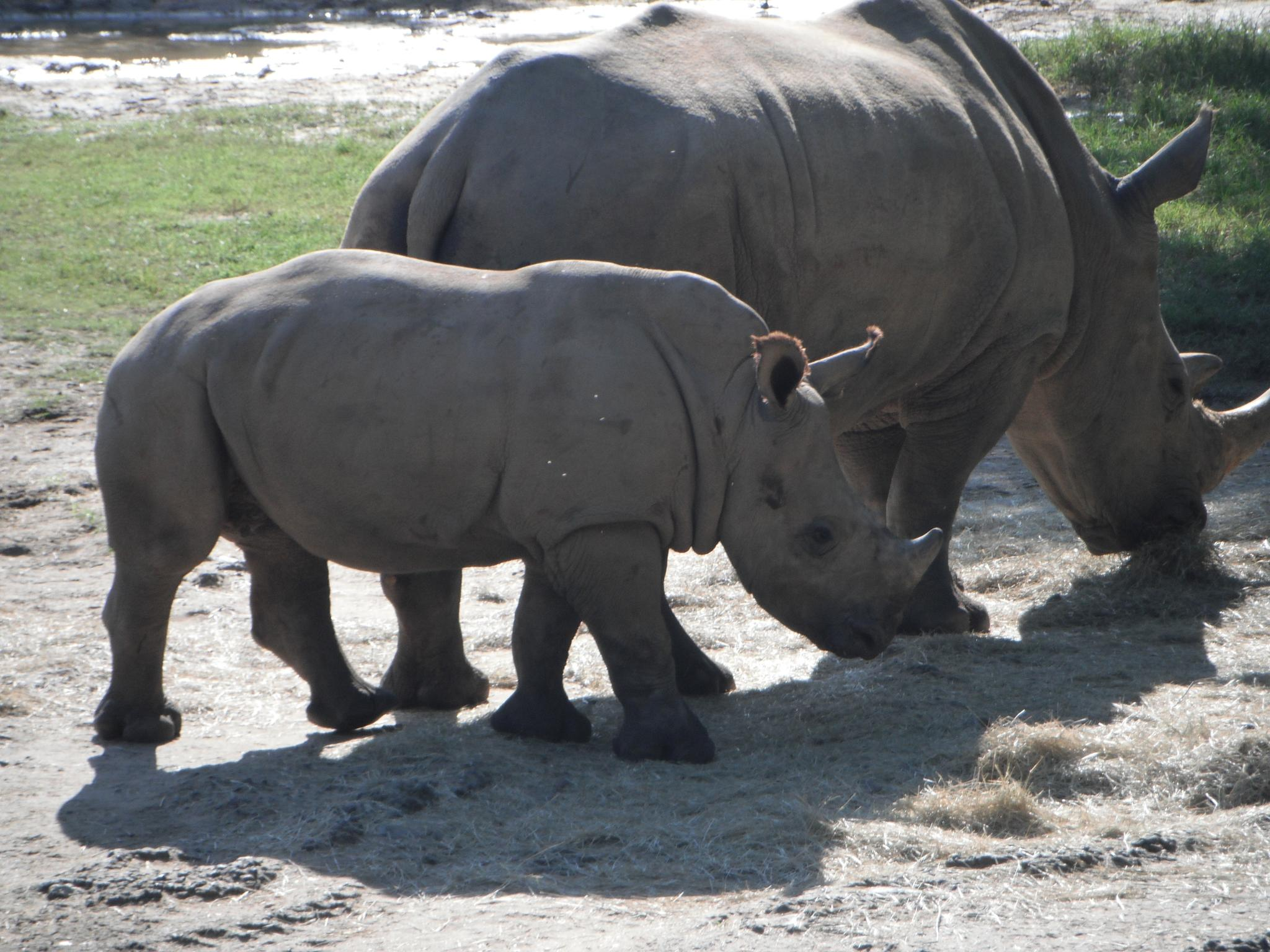
One area of research and conservation has focused on rhinoceros population levels

As a zoological park, Disney's Animal Kingdom is engaged in research and conservation efforts involving its animal species. Since the park's opening in 1998, the resident elephant herd has produced seven calves, with births in 2003, 2004, 2005, 2008, 2010, 2011 and 2016. In 2008, the park's giraffe herd produced four newborns, raising the total number of giraffe births since opening to eleven.

In 1999, one of the park's white rhinoceros gave birth to a female calf named Nande. In 2006, Nande and Hasani, another of the park's rhinos, were transferred to Uganda's Ziwa animal sanctuary, in the first attempt to re-introduce white rhinos to the country. Civil strife had caused the white rhinoceros to be eradicated from the area. In June 2009, Nande gave birth to a male calf, the first such birth in Uganda in over 25 years. By January 2010, eight white rhinos had been born at Animal Kingdom since the park's opening; the most recent was born to another Animal Kingdom-born mother.

== Gallery ==
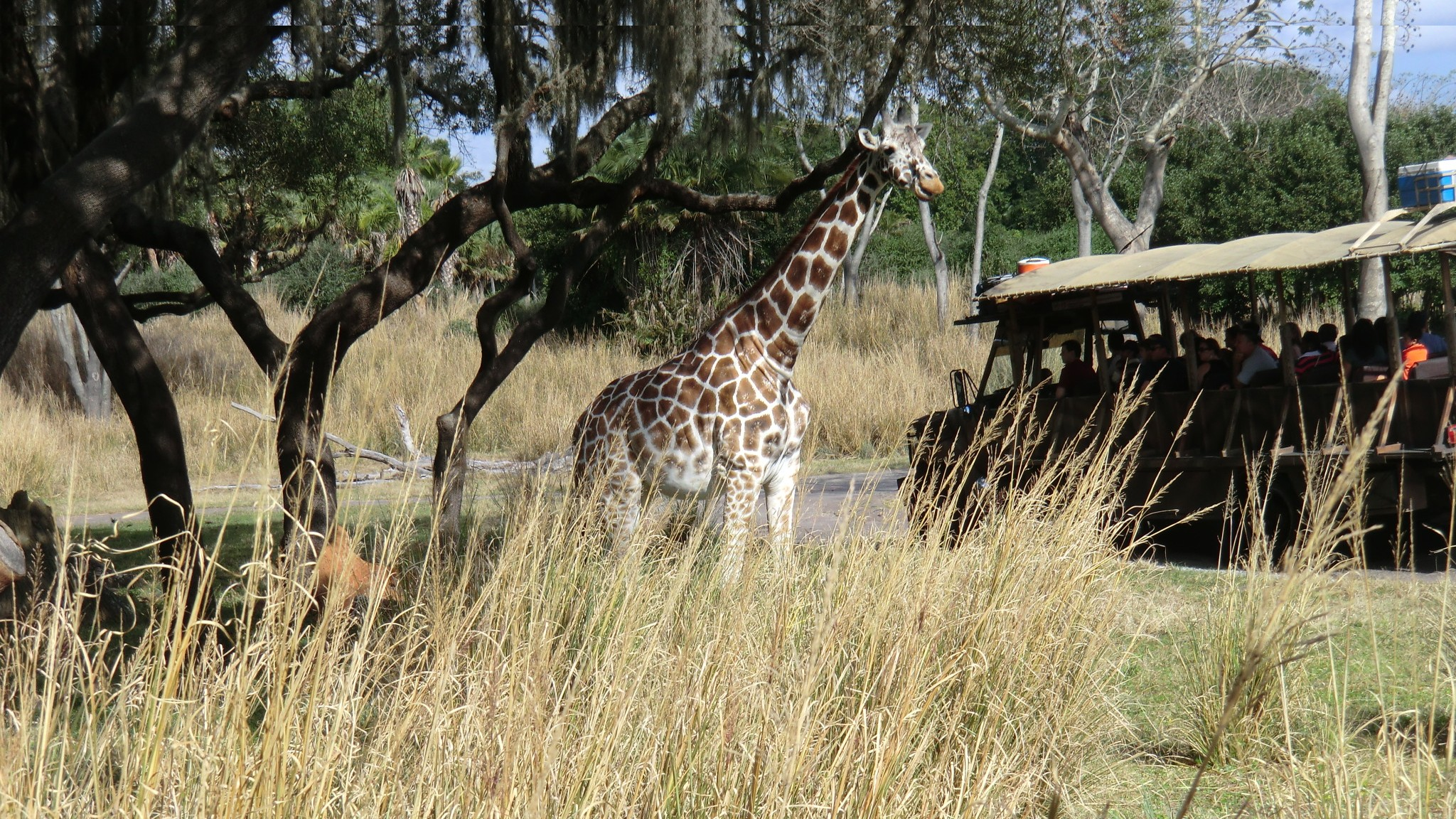
Safari tour rides show animals in natural environments.

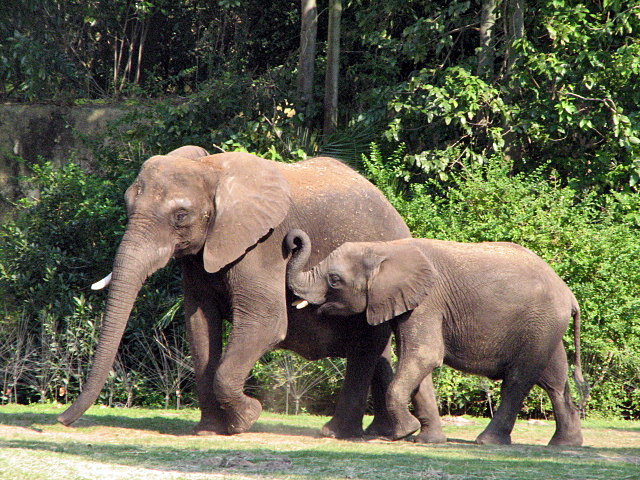
Elephants at the Kilimanjaro Safari.

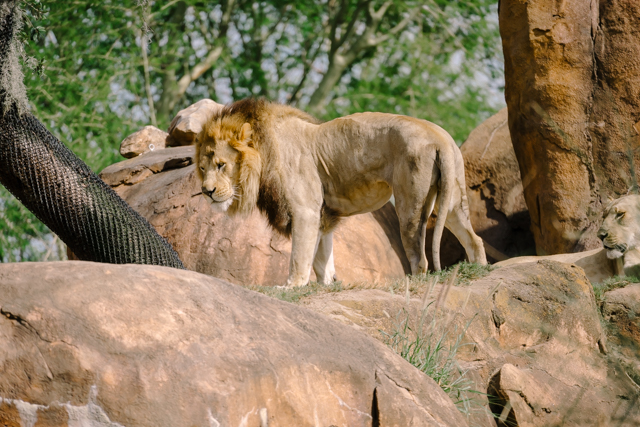
Lion (Panthera leo)

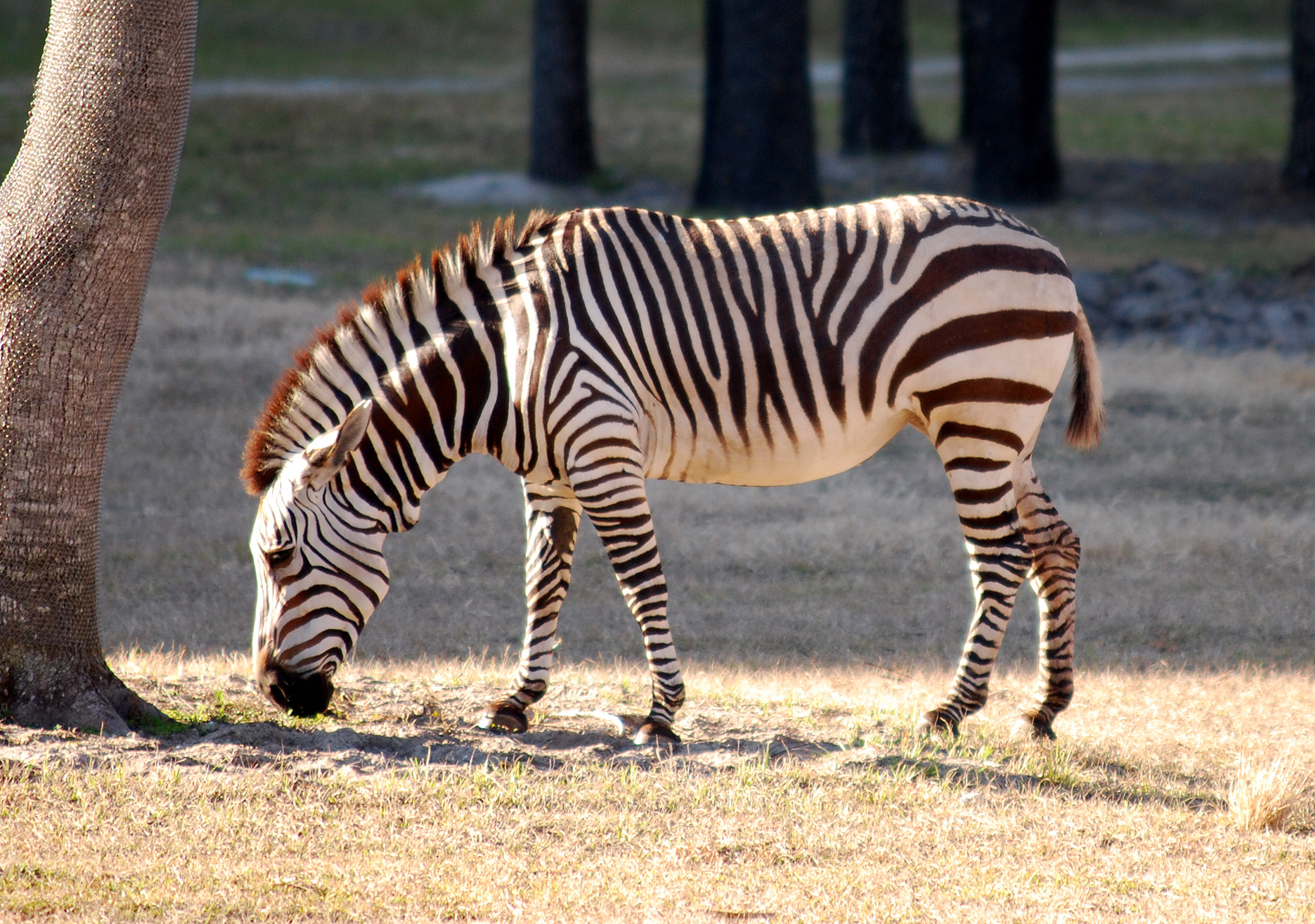
Hartmann's mountain zebra (Equus zebra hartmannae)

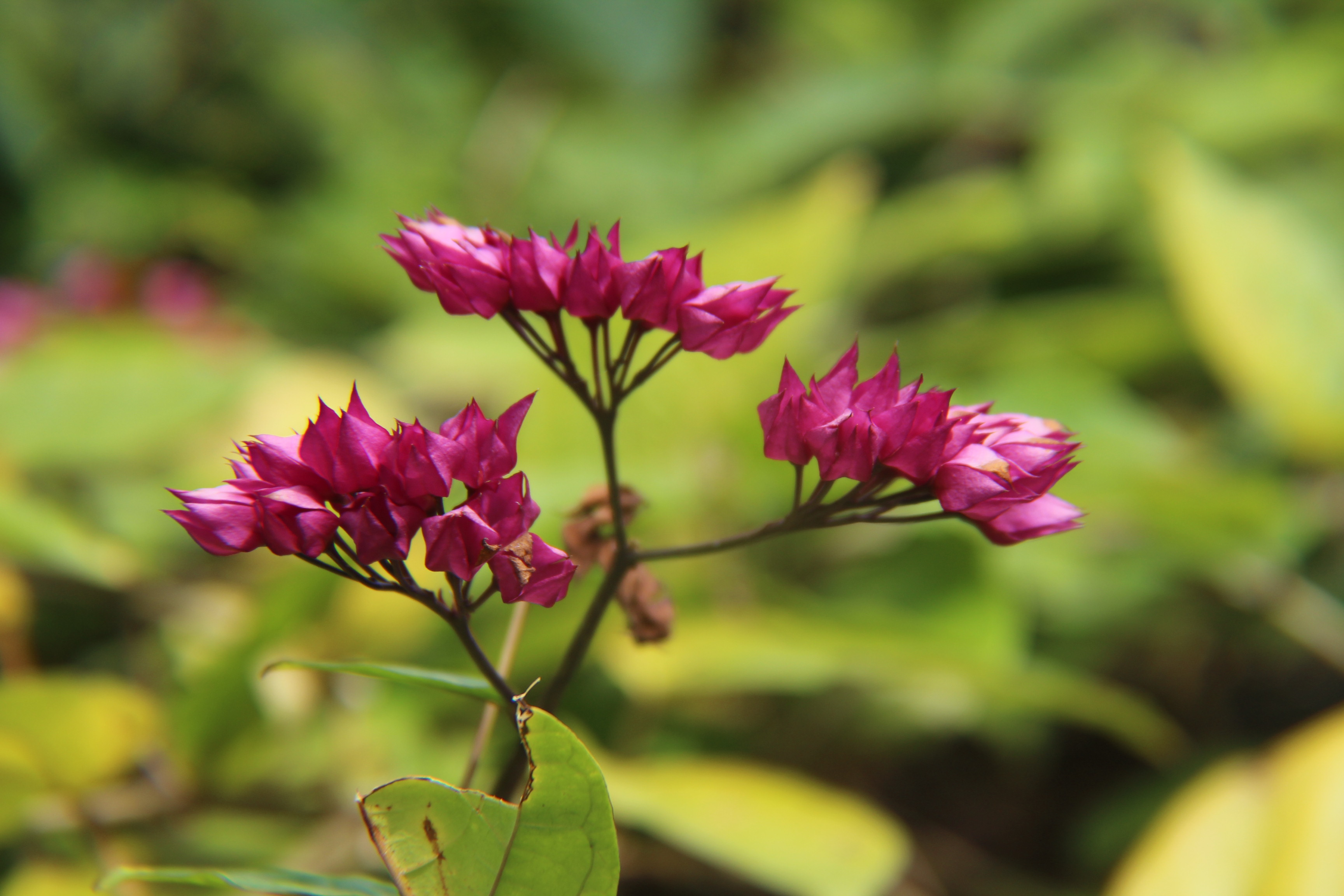
One of the many flowering plants at the park.

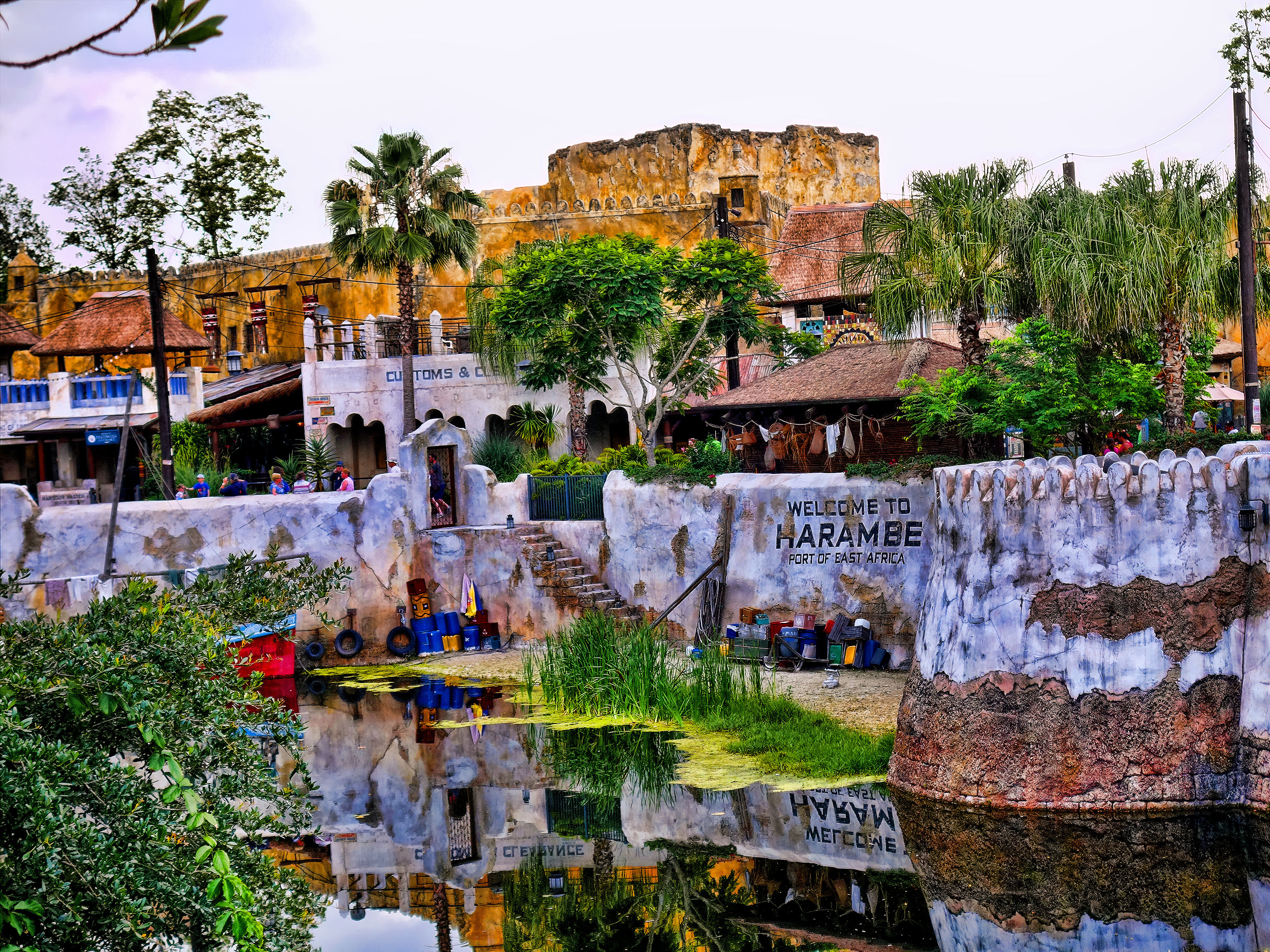
Africa and Harambe Village

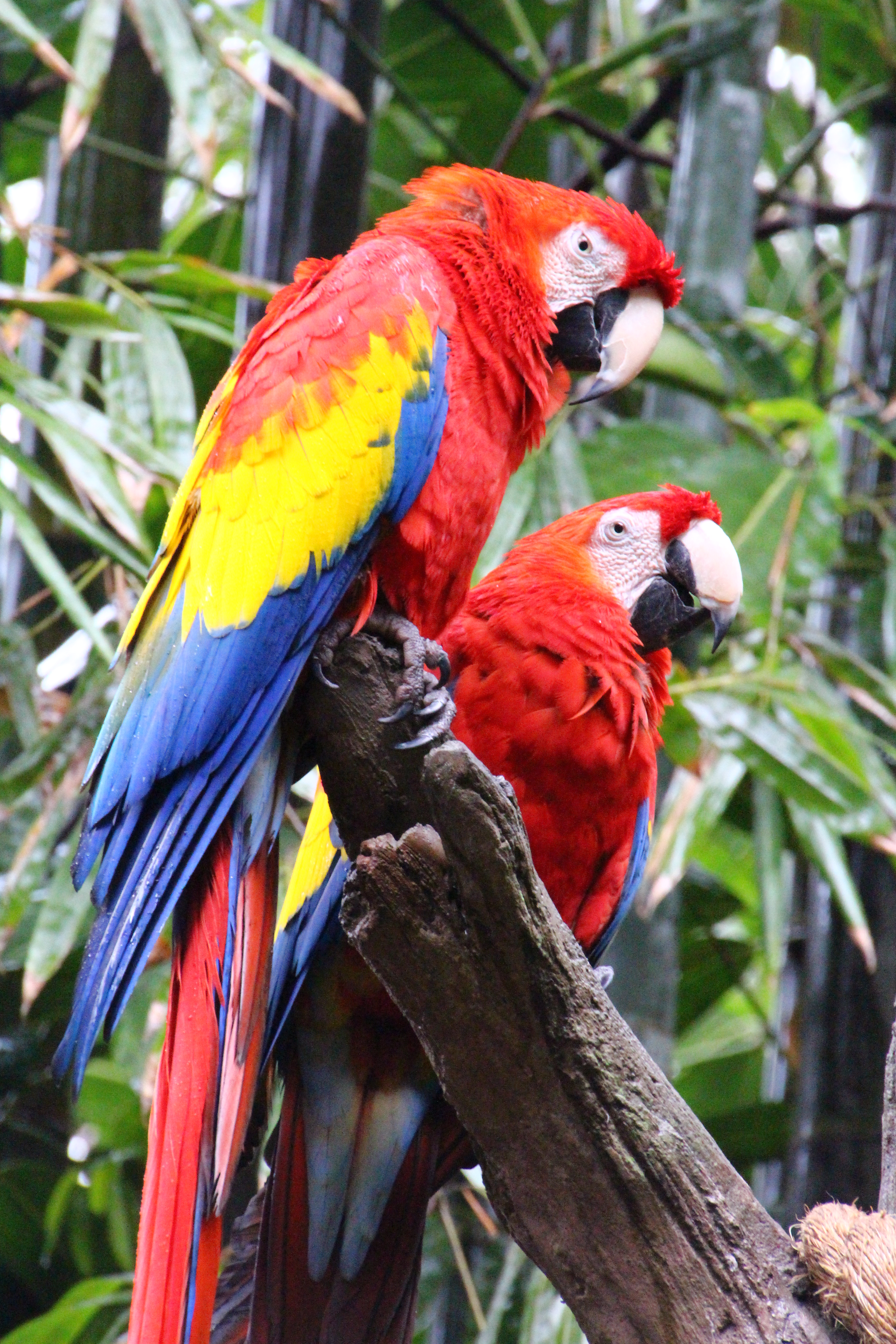
Scarlet macaws at Discovery Island.

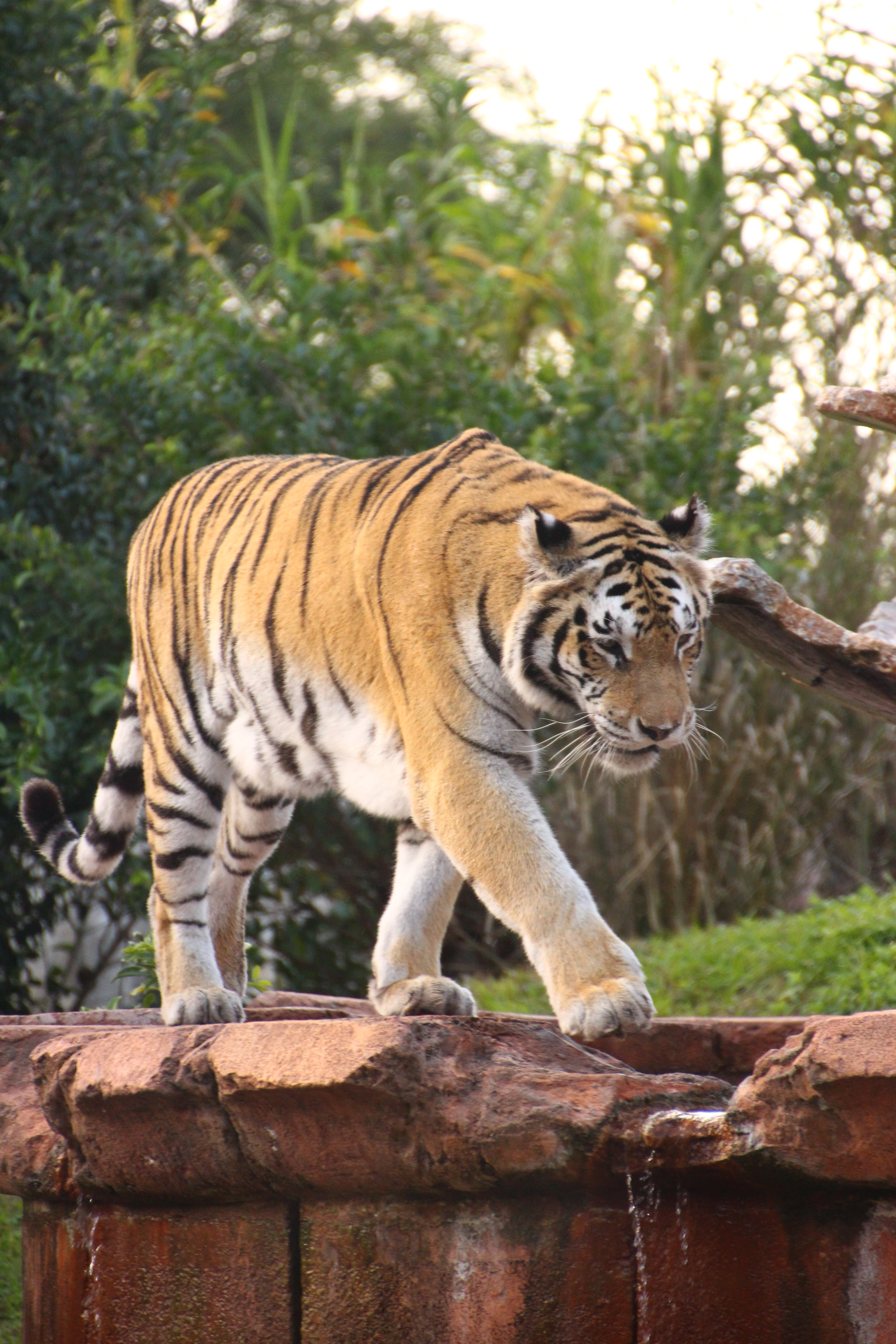
Tiger (Panthera tigris)

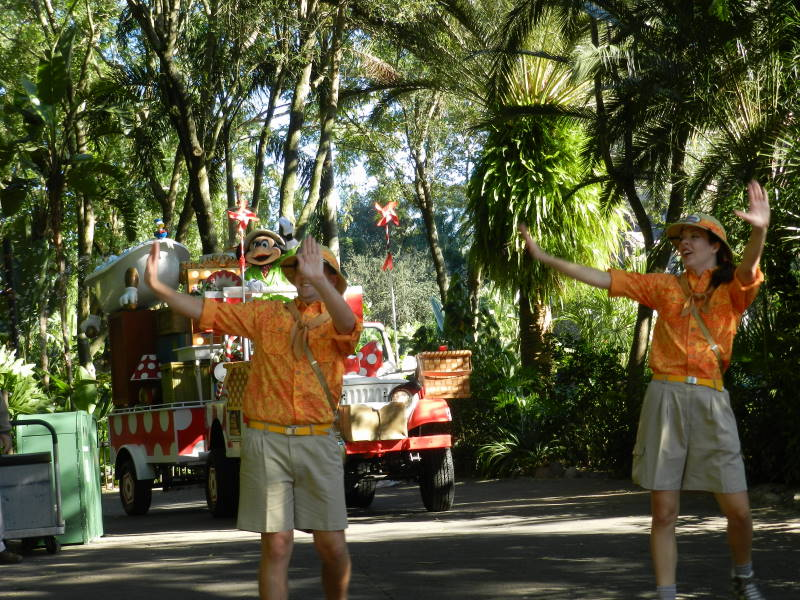
Mickey's Jammin' Jungle Parade, which ran from 2001 through 2014.

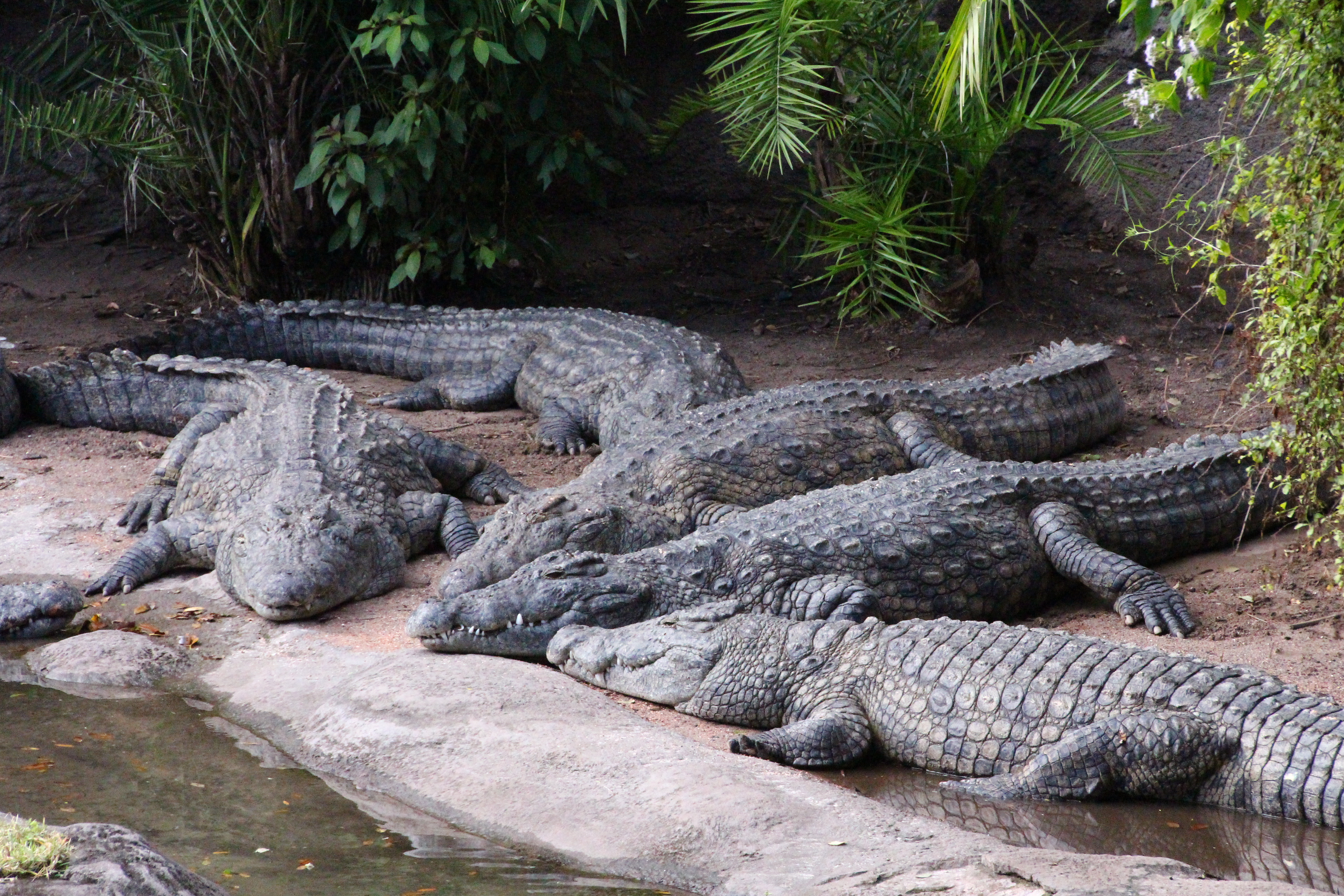
Nile crocodiles on display.

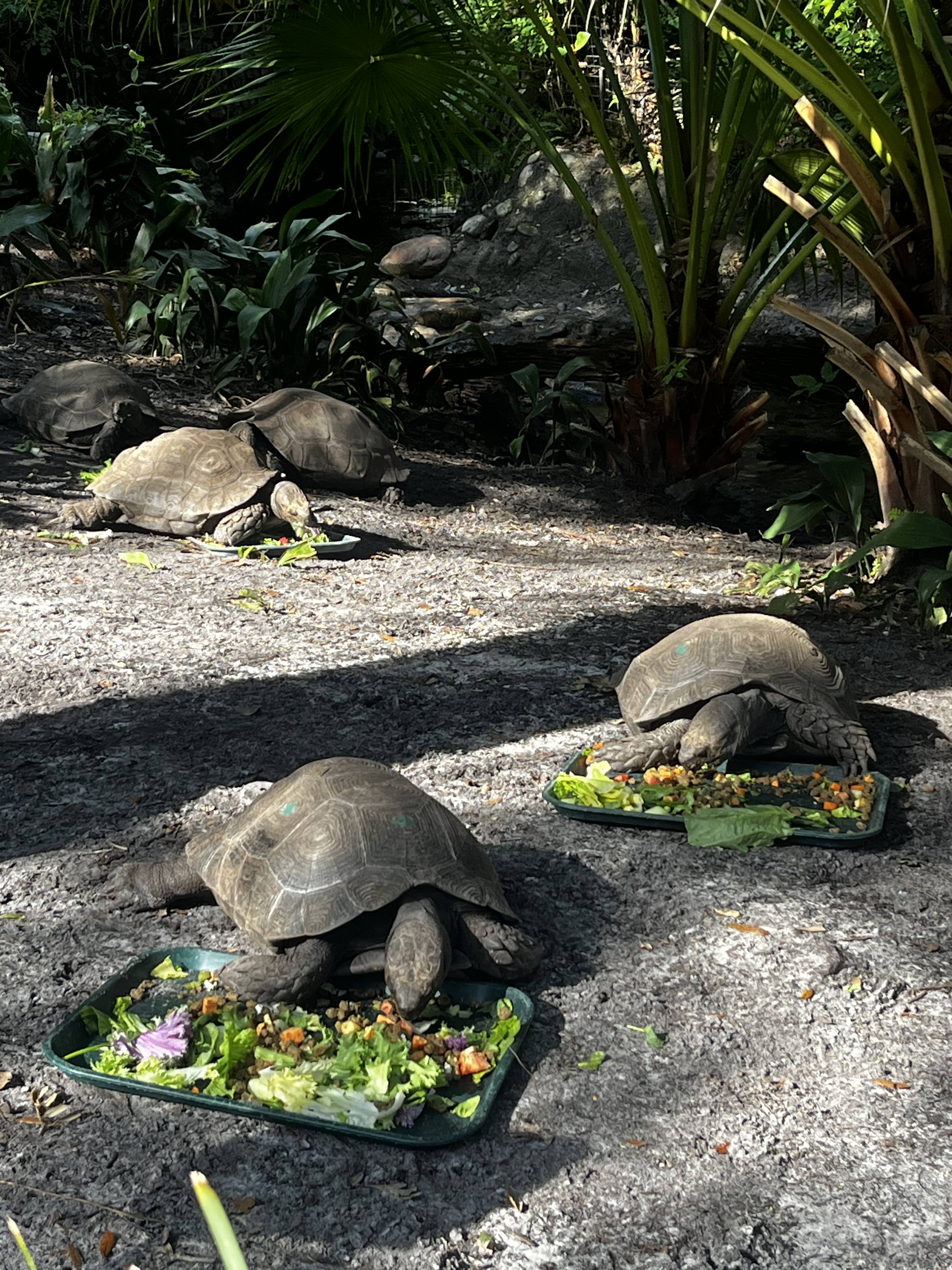
Tortoises being fed

== Controversy ==
Several Florida-based animal rights groups and PETA voiced concerns when the park originally opened, citing Walt Disney World's previous missteps in handling animals at the defunct Discovery Island. The groups protested, and PETA tried to convince travel agents not to book trips to the park. On opening day, the Orange County Sheriff's office sent about 150 deputies; about two dozen protesters showed up. The protest lasted two hours, and there were no arrests.

Following a U.S. Department of Agriculture (USDA) inspection of the park, it was revealed that 31 animals died at Animal Kingdom between September 1997 and April 1998 from accidents, poisonings, fights, and other causes. Two Asian small-clawed otters died after ingesting loquat seeds from trees planted in their exhibit; two cheetah cubs died from ethylene glycol poisoning; nine herd animals died from injuries caused by fights, being entangled in fences while trying to escape, and, in one case, being kicked by an ostrich. Two crowned cranes were killed after being run over by safari vehicles in two separate incidents. The USDA ultimately found no violations of animal-welfare regulations. Disney responded to the report by hiring additional security to prevent animals from fighting, relocating the crowned cranes to walking paths, as well as adding mirrors to the safari vehicles.

One year after the park opened, Animal Rights Foundation of Florida complained that a New Year's Eve fireworks show could upset the animals. A USDA inspector came to the park and found no problems with launching low-noise fireworks one-half mile (800 m) away. In January 2015, the animal rights group In Defense of Animals listed the park at number 10 on its 2014 "list of worst zoos for elephants."

=== Incident ===
In October 2014, a snake dropped out of a tree and bit a boy, precipitating the death of his great-grandmother who suffered a cardiac arrest as a reaction to the incident. The park confirmed that the snake that bit the boy was a non-venomous indigenous snake and that it did not escape from an enclosure. A lawsuit was threatened because of the incident. The lawsuit was never filed.

== Attendance ==
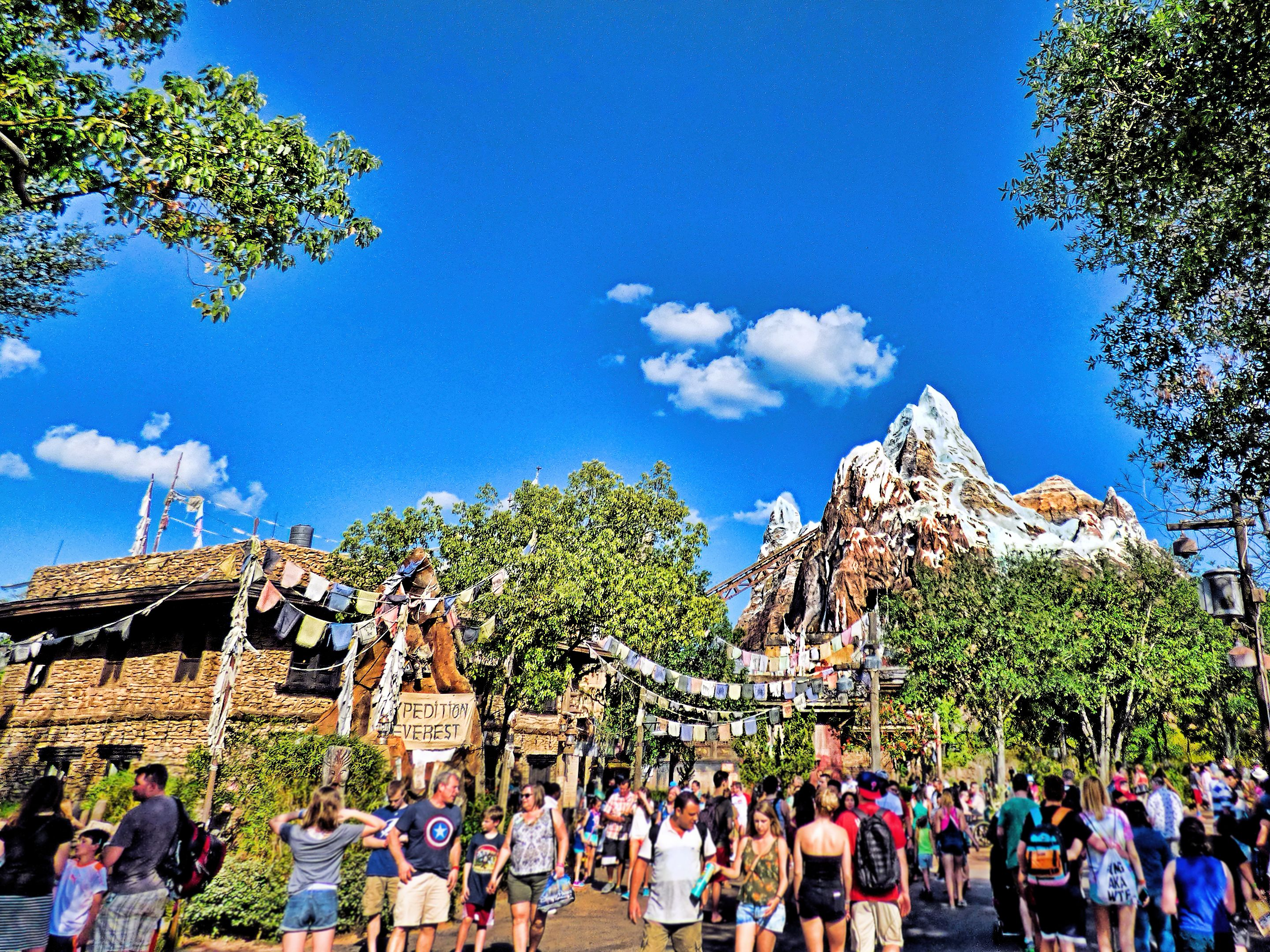
Outside area of the Expedition Everest roller coaster entrance

Year	Attendance
2013	10,198,000
2014	10,402,000
2015	10,922,000
2016	10,844,000
2017	12,500,000
2018	13,750,000
2019	13,888,000
2020	4,166,000
2021	7,194,000
2022	9,027,000
2023	8,770,000
2024	8,800,000
2025	8,782,000

As of 2025, Disney's Animal Kingdom is the 15th-most-visited theme park in the world.

== See also ==
- Incidents at Disney's Animal Kingdom
- List of Disney's Animal Kingdom attractions
- Rail transport in Walt Disney Parks and Resorts
- World Nature at Epcot
