= Kilimanjaro Safaris =

Attraction at Disney's Animal Kingdom

Disney's Animal Kingdom
- Area: Africa
- Coordinates: 28°21′39″N 81°35′37″W
- Status: Operating
- Opening date: April 22, 1998

Ride statistics
- Attraction type: Safari
- Designer: Walt Disney Imagineering
- Model: African wildlife safari
- Music: "Hapa Duniani" by African Dawn (queue)
- Speed: 8 mph (13 km/h)
- Site area: 4,791,600 sq ft (445,150 m^{2})
- Capacity: 3,000 riders per hour
- Vehicle type: Safari truck
- Vehicles: Ford F-650
- Riders per vehicle: 36
- Rows: 9
- Riders per row: 4
- Duration: ~21:00
- Lightning Lane available
- Wheelchair accessible
- Assistive listening available

Kilimanjaro Safaris is a safari attraction at Disney's Animal Kingdom on the Walt Disney World Resort property in Bay Lake, Florida. It simulates an open-sided safari ride through the savanna of East Africa.

== Attraction ==
=== Story ===
The attraction simulates a short photo safari aboard a safari vehicle through the Harambe Wildlife Reserve in Harambe, East Africa. While traveling through the large, open exhibit, the game driver points out animals and provides entertainment. Various African animal species appear as if they could come right up to the tourists, though there are cleverly disguised fences and boundaries to ensure guest safety.

=== Animals ===
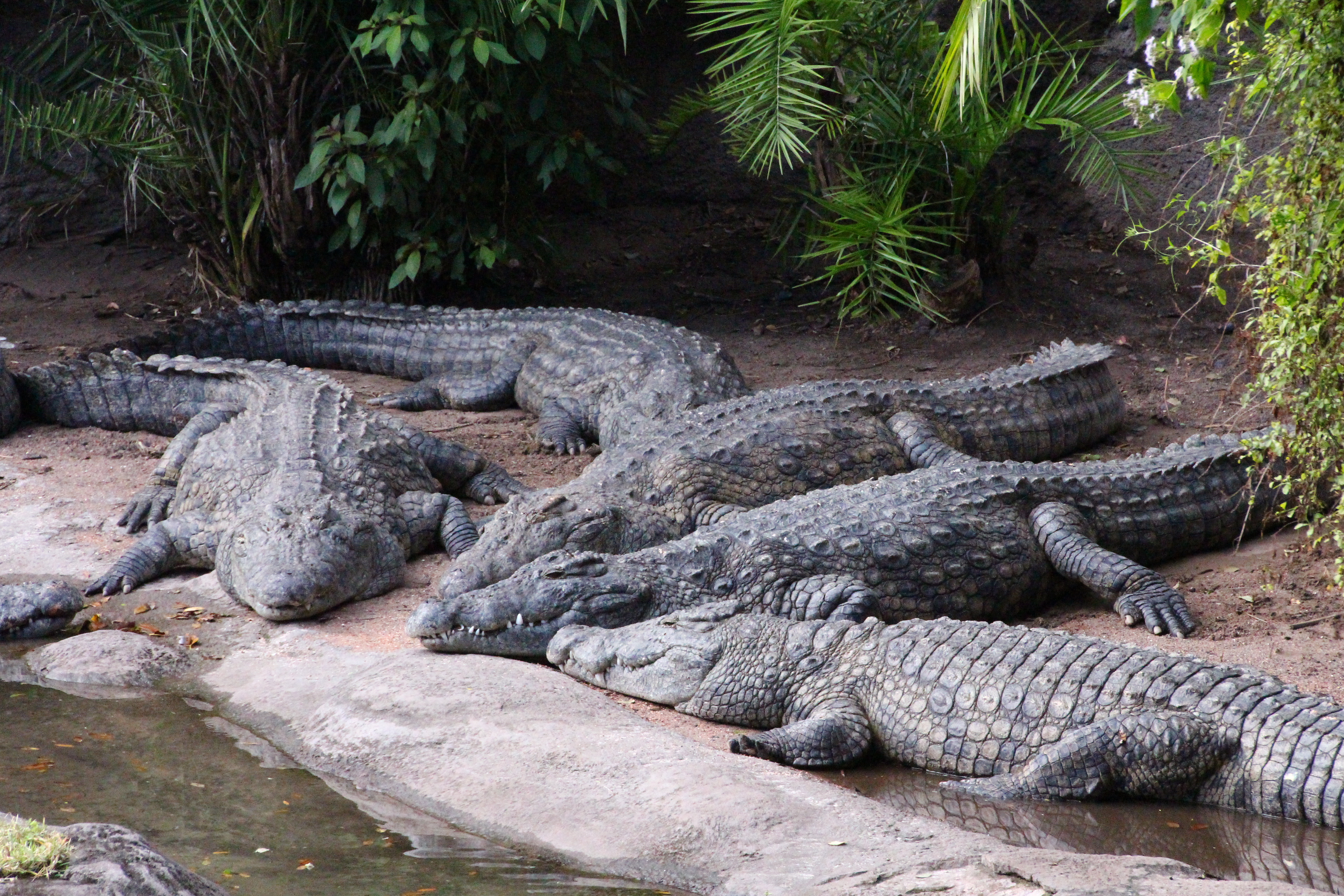
Crocodiles at Animal Kingdom

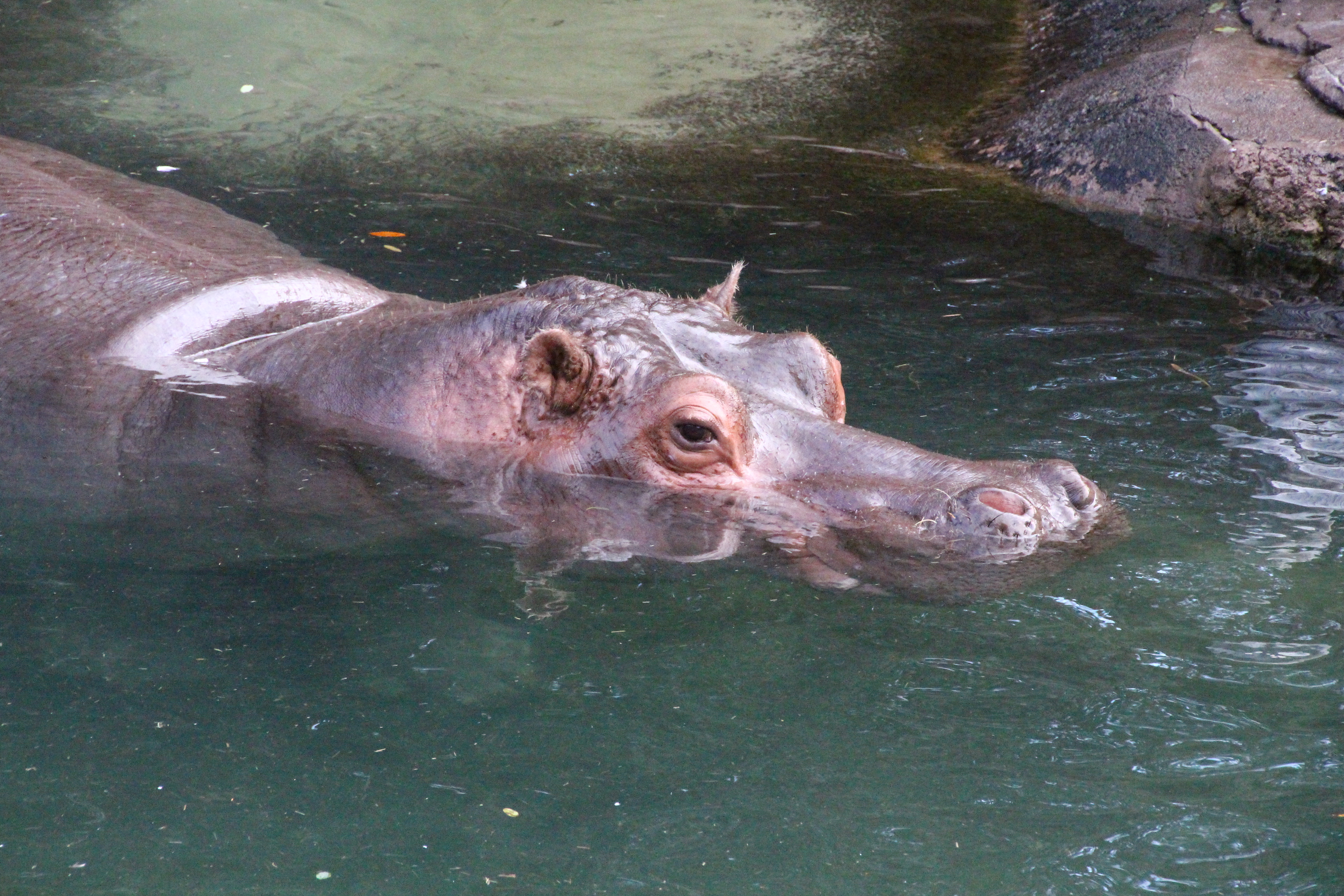
Hippopotamus at Animal Kingdom

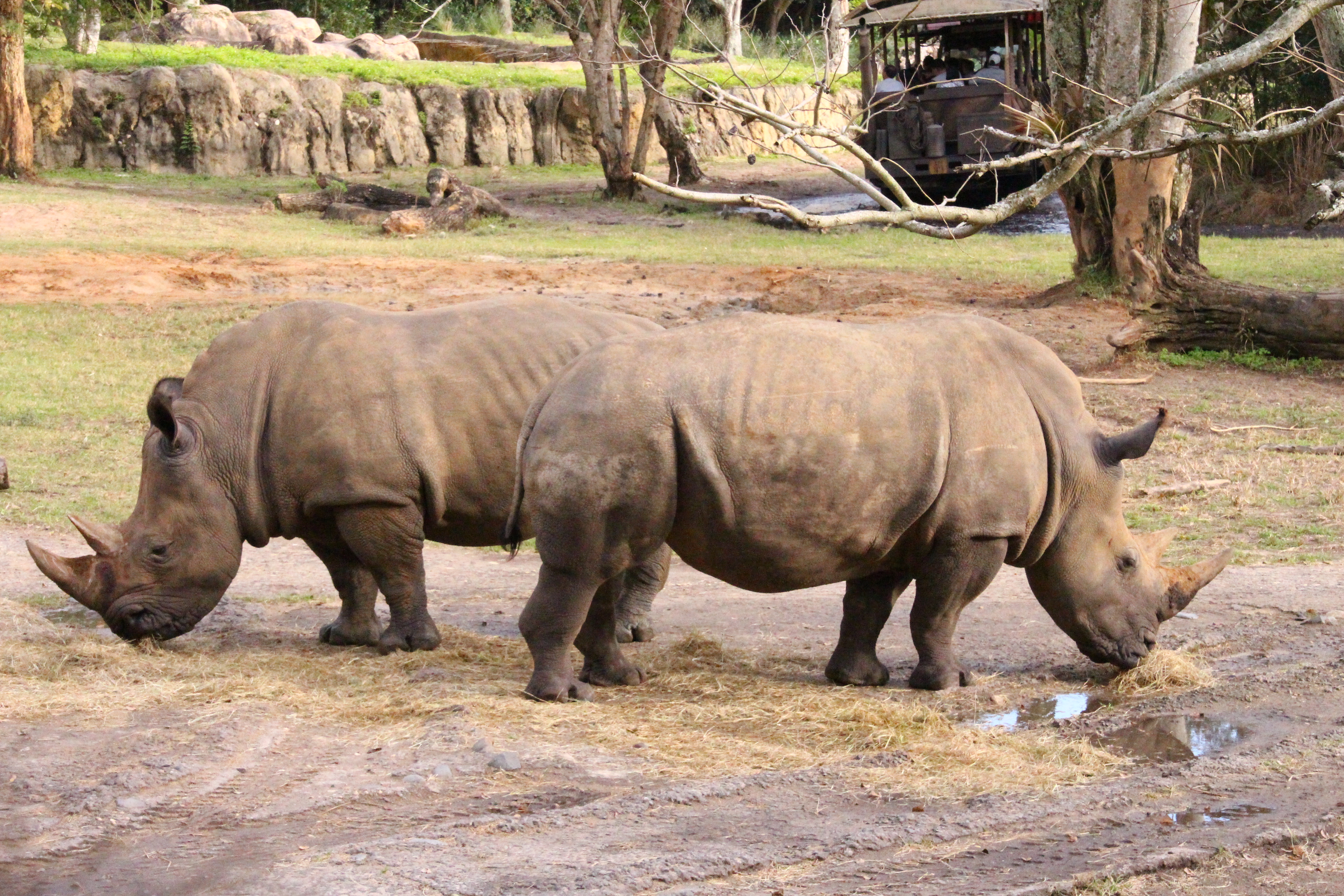
Rhinos at Animal Kingdom

- African bush elephant
- African wild dog
- Ankole cattle
- Black crowned crane (seen in the queue)
- Black rhinoceros
- Blue wildebeest
- Bongo
- Cheetah
- Common eland
- Common ostrich
- Common warthog
- Greater flamingo
- Greater kudu
- Hartmann's mountain zebra
- Hippopotamus
- Lion
- Mandrill
- Masai giraffe
- Nigerian dwarf goat
- Nile crocodile
- Okapi
- Pink-backed pelican
- Sable antelope
- Saddle-billed stork
- Spotted Hyena
- Springbok
- Waterbuck
- White rhinoceros

== History ==
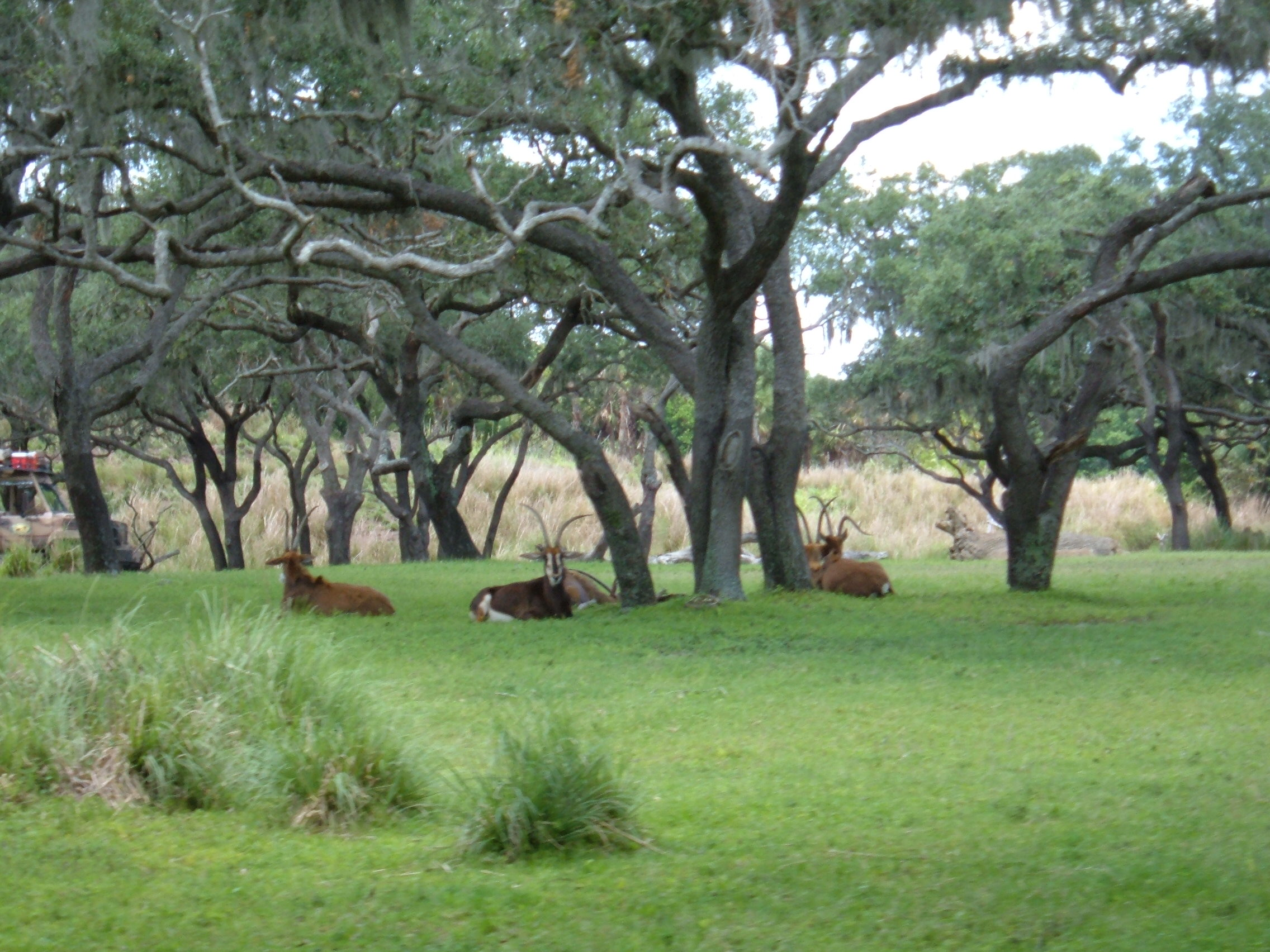
The view from the Kilimanjaro Safaris vehicle

Long before the safari or even Walt Disney World opened, Walt Disney wanted to use real African animals for the river attraction Jungle Cruise at Disneyland. However, for several reasons, Audio-Animatronics replicas were placed instead.

The ride originally included a scripted portion where the safari truck - callsign "Simba-1" - would be contacted by a habitat warden and a scientist to hunt down poachers that had captured a mother elephant and her child - Big Red and Little Red, respectively. The poachers would have been captured at gunpoint by another cast member acting as a warden. This element of the attraction was eventually eliminated and replaced with scaring off the poachers after a pursuit.

During Cast Previews of Disney's Animal Kingdom, there was a "Dark Ending" in which the safari vehicle encountered the corpse of Big Red. She was on the ground, symbolizing that the poachers got to her and the tour group was too late to save the mother elephant. Despite being only a statue, this scene proved too shocking for families and children. Many complaints were filed, so Disney removed the simulated corpse to give the attraction a happier ending.

Kilimanjaro Safaris typically operates until sundown. However, during the holiday season of 1998, the safaris were continued at night and dubbed Kilimanjaro Night Safaris. Though many animals were asleep, or unable to be seen at night, the attraction had a completely different script and storyline. This "new" attraction featured additional animal sounds, reflectors hidden in the foliage to resemble animals' eyes, and an actual African dance troupe, who performed around a bonfire in the area normally occupied by the attraction's elephants. Kilimanjaro Night Safaris only ran during that initial holiday season. After this time, it was deemed that the additional costs, plus the fact that animal visibility was poor (eliciting many guest complaints), made Night Safaris unfeasible to continue regularly.

In 2004, much of the savanna's drainage system had to be replaced. The attraction remained open during the rehab, with green tarps covering the construction sites to keep the animals out.

Between 2007 and 2009, the trucks were extended with an extra row of seating, allowing for more capacity. Also, the safari script/story were significantly changed, placing less of an emphasis on the "Little Red" storyline, and more about the animals in the reserve and the need to find a lost elephant at the end. This led to a somewhat confused plot in which guests are searching for a lost "mother elephant" and eventually find her baby which, according to the story, had already been safe the whole time.

In July 2010 it was announced that guests will soon be able to go on "guided treks" around the savanna. This will include areas that are not part of the regular ride experience.

On February 10, 2012 it was announced that the "Little Red" portion of the ride would be replaced with a zebra exhibit. It opened in the fall of 2012. The attraction housed Hartmann's mountain zebras, but these were removed four months after their arrival due to "acclimation" issues. Some reports claim that the zebras were fighting each other, biting at vehicles or each other, standing in the road, or just causing issues due to excessive mating behavior. They were eventually replaced with addax antelope.

In 2016, Night Safaris were reintroduced as a part of the expansion of Disney's Animal Kingdom. The nighttime changes included a "sunset," animal sounds, and the introduction of hyenas and painted dogs to the reserve. The ride path was shortened for the night safaris in order to avoid areas where no animals would be visible.

== Incidents ==
- Initially, there were a number of animal deaths from disease, toxic exposure, maternal killings, and park vehicles. The United States Department of Agriculture investigation found no violations of the Animal Welfare Act for the 29 deaths that happened September 1997 – April 1998.
- In June 1998, the death of a hippopotamus from probable pneumonia caused a 40-minute closure of the ride.
- In July 2007, a man broke his ankle after jumping out of a ride vehicle.
- In February 2008, a small fire broke out at the front of a ride vehicle. A woman was taken to hospital after jumping from the truck and three other people suffered minor injuries.

== Construction ==
- The attraction features custom-built 1990-2002 GMC Topkicks and Ford Super Duty trucks riding washed-out, rutted roads. The roadbed is actually constructed of dark brown-colored concrete embedded with permanent tire ruts. The vehicles appear to have mud on them, but the "mud" is actually spray painted cement. The fuel for the vehicles is liquid propane.
- The flamingo island is a huge Hidden Mickey. Other Hidden Mickeys can be found along the ride path.
- Between each ecosystem are both chain road sensors and bars to prevent animals from venturing between sections. The vehicles drive directly on these obstacles.

== See also ==
- Safari park
