= List of Disney's Animal Kingdom attractions =

Disney's Animal Kingdom is a theme park located at the Walt Disney World Resort. Below is a list of the past and present attractions at this park, arranged by "land" and with brief descriptions.

Restaurants, shops, and character meets are listed in this article. The term "attractions" is used by Disney as a catch-all term for rides, shows, and exhibits.

== Oasis ==
- Oasis Exhibits – an animal exhibit that includes giant anteaters, swamp wallabies, etc.

== Discovery Island ==
=== Current attractions ===
- Adventurers Outpost – Meet Mickey Mouse and Minnie Mouse in their exploration headquarters.
- Discovery Island Trails – Discover the many animals around the Tree of Life.
- The Wilderness Explorers – interactive adventure where visitors can earn badges by completing challenges

=== Current entertainment ===
- Tree of Life Theater
  - Zootopia: Better Zoogether! – a 3D film based on Zootopia.

=== Past attractions ===
- Discovery River Boats – a riverboat ride. Originally opened on April 22, 1998. Closed in September 1998 and re-opened as Discovery River Taxis in November 1998. The attraction closed again in January 1999, only to be re-opened yet again in March 1999, this time as the Disney Radio River Cruise.

=== Past entertainment ===
- Mickey’s Jammin' Jungle Parade – a parade that centers around Mickey Mouse and other Disney animals paraded through Discovery Island to Africa.
- March of the Art-imals Parade – a parade showcasing the performance and floats of artistic style animals.
- Tree of Life Theater
  - It's Tough to Be a Bug! — a 3D film based on A Bug's Life.

== Pandora – The World of Avatar ==
- Avatar Flight of Passage – a flying augmented reality E-ticket simulator attraction, where guests fly on a mountain Banshee.
- Na'vi River Journey – a boat dark ride attraction, showcasing the native fauna and flora of Pandora, including Audio-Animatronics and 3-D holograms.

== Africa ==
=== Current attractions ===
- Harambe Wildlife Preserve
  - Kilimanjaro Safaris – a safari-alike attraction that takes guests on the safari tour of African animals roaming freely in the replica of the African wildlife landscape.
  - Gorilla Falls Exploration Trail – an animal exhibit/walkthrough attraction featuring gorillas, colobus monkeys, okapis, etc.
  - Wild Africa Trek – an animal exhibit/walkthrough attraction with African animals located nearby Kilimanjaro Safaris.
- Wildlife Express Train
  - Harambe Station – a train ride to Conservation Station

=== Current entertainment ===
- Harambe Theater
  - Festival of the Lion King – a live musical revue performance based on the 1994 classic animated film The Lion King.

=== Past attractions ===
- Harambe Wildlife Preserve
  - Pangani Forest Exploration Trail (August 1998 to May 2016)

=== Past entertainment ===
- Harambe Theater
  - A Celebration of Festival of the Lion King

== Conservation Station ==
=== Current attractions ===
- Conservation Station
  - Bluey's Wild World at Conservation Station
- Habitat Habit!
- Jumping Junction
- Wildlife Express Train
  - Harambe Station – a train ride to Africa

=== Past attractions ===
- Rafiki's Planet Watch
  - Affection Section
  - Conservation Station
    - The Animation Experience at Conservation Station

== Asia ==
=== Current attractions ===
- Expedition Everest – a roller coaster themed to Mount Everest.
- Kali River Rapids – a river rapids ride along the Chakranadi River.
- Maharajah Jungle Trek – a tour featuring more than 100 species of animals.

=== Current entertainment ===
- Anandapur Theatre
  - Feathered Friends of Flight – a stage show featuring colorful, exotic birds.

=== Past entertainment ===
- Anandapur Theatre
  - Flights of Wonder – closed on December 31, 2017 New Year's Eve. Replaced by UP! A Great Bird Adventure.
  - UP! A Great Bird Adventure – Opened April 22, 2018, replacing Flights of Wonder. It was a stage show featuring exotic birds and characters from Disney/Pixar's Up. The final performance was on March 12, 2020, due to the COVID-19 outbreak impacting Florida. Replaced by Feathered Friends in Flight.
- Discovery River Amphitheater
  - The Jungle Book: Alive with Magic – It was a limited-engagement show based on the 2016 live-action film, would fill the space of the delayed Rivers of Light night-time show until it was replaced by Rivers of Light.
  - Rivers of Light – Opened February 17, 2017. The final performance of the original version of the show would be on May 23, 2019, and make way for a new updated version of the show featuring animated characters, retitled Rivers of Light: We Are One.
  - Rivers of Light: We Are One – Performances suspended during COVID-19 pandemic. Permanent closure announced on July 16, 2020.

== Tropical Americas (Opening in 2027) ==
=== Current entertainment ===
- Theater in the Wild
  - Finding Nemo: The Big Blue and Beyond!

=== Upcoming attractions ===
- Indiana Jones and the Myth of the Jade Serpent
- Antonio's Fiesta de Encanto
- El Carrusel de los Animalitos (The Little Animals' Carousel)

== Former Areas ==
=== DinoLand U.S.A. ===
==== Past attractions ====
- Dinosaur
- Cretaceous Trail
- Dino-Sue
- The Boneyard
- Dinosaur Jubilee
- Cretaceous
- Kids Discovery Clubs
- Chester and Hester's Dino-Rama
  - Primeval Whirl
  - TriceraTop Spin
  - Fossil Fun Games

==== Past entertainment ====
- Theater in the Wild
  - Tarzan Rocks! – A stage musical based on the 1999 film Tarzan
  - Journey into Jungle Book
  - Finding Nemo – The Musical
- Discovery River Amphitheater
  - Disney KiteTails
  - Rivers of Light

=== Camp Minnie–Mickey ===
==== Past entertainment ====
- Grandmother Willow's Theater
  - Pocahontas and Forest Friends

== See also ==
- List of Disney theme park attractions
- List of lands at Disney theme parks
- List of Magic Kingdom attractions
- List of Epcot attractions
- List of Disney's Hollywood Studios attractions

== Bibliography ==
- Veness, Susan (2015). The Hidden Magic of Walt Disney World: Over 600 Secrets of the Magic Kingdom, Epcot, Disney's Hollywood Studios, and Disney's Animal Kingdom. Simon and Schuster. ISBN 9781440587818.
