= Discovery River Boats =

Defunct boat ride at Disney's Animal Kingdom

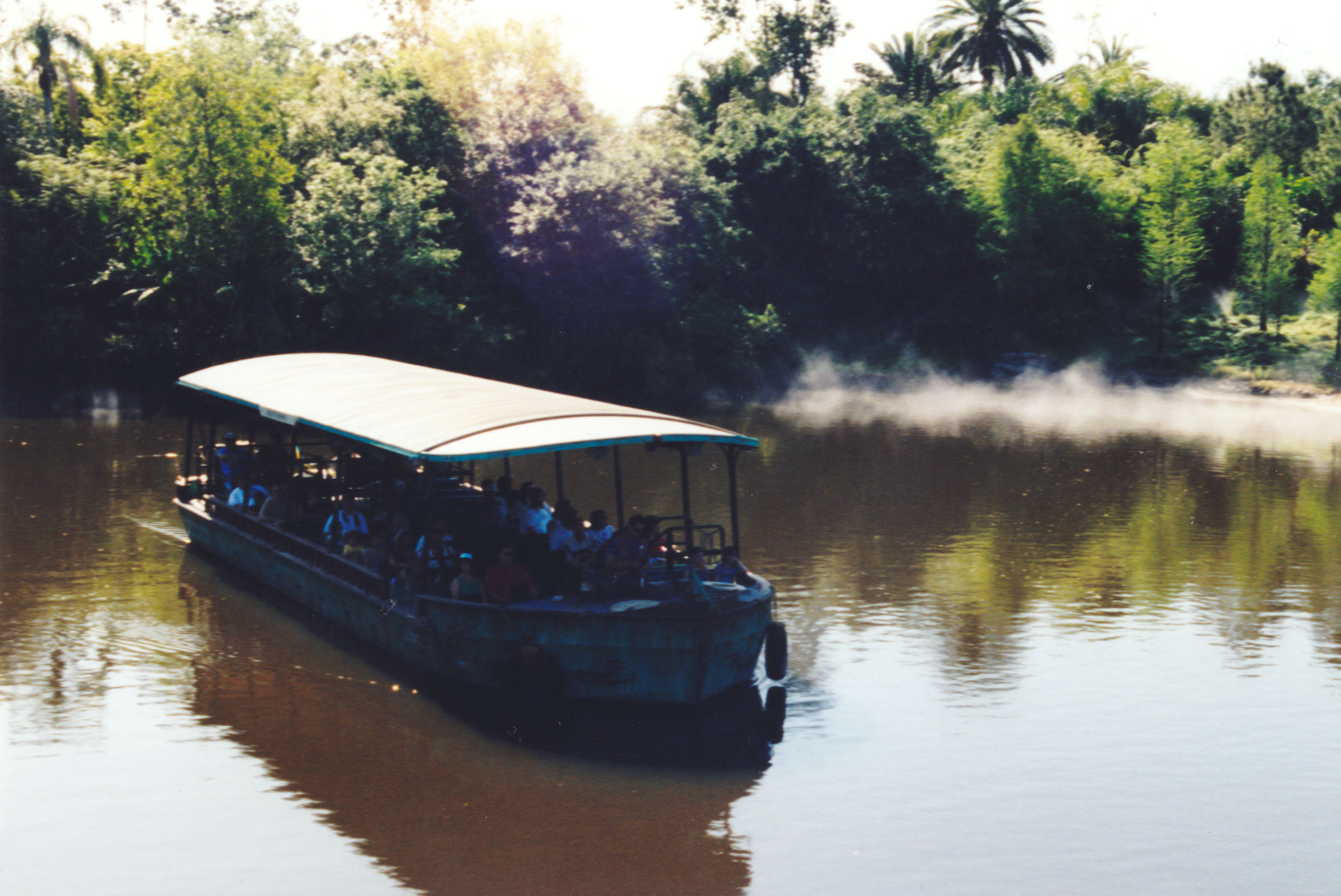

Disney's Animal Kingdom
- Area: Safari Village; Upcountry Landing
- Coordinates: 28°21′24″N 81°35′24″W
- Status: Removed
- Opening date: April 22, 1998
- Closing date: August 21, 1999

Ride statistics
- Attraction type: Boat ride
- Vehicle type: Natural gas powered boats
- Riders per vehicle: 62
- Duration: 10:00
- Vehicle names: The Darting Dragonfly; Otter Nonsense; Leaping Lizard; Crocodile Belle; Hasty Hippo

Discovery River Boats was a boat ride attraction at Walt Disney World's Disney's Animal Kingdom near Orlando, Florida. It was designed as a means of transporting visitors, offering views of the Tree of Life, a moving dinosaur in the water, geysers, and a dragon's lair. It opened on April 22, 1998, and closed on August 21, 1999.

== History ==
The boats docked at the Safari Village and in Asia. The ride was a non-stop trip that brought the passengers near to the Tree of Life and past all the lands of the theme park. During the journey, the guests would be shown small animals that had been brought on board. The captain would walk the aisles and point out other items on the trek. The ride was similar to the Jungle Cruise in Adventureland at the Magic Kingdom, however there was little to see exclusive to the ride. A handful of scenes included a fire-breathing dragon's cave outside Camp Minnie Mickey (intended as a preview for the unbuilt Beastly Kingdom), geysers in Africa, and a bathing Iguanodon outside of Dinoland U.S.A.

The attraction was renamed to "Discovery River Taxi" in November 1998. The ride was again renamed to "Radio Disney River Cruise" in March 1999, playing audio commentary from Radio Disney DJs Just Plain Mark and Zippy, who were broadcasting from the top of the Tree of Life, as part of the storyline. The boats were all re-painted in new colors, and animals were no longer brought on board. The routes were also modified, with boats returning to the departing dock instead of stopping at the other dock for guests to disembark.

== Decline and closure ==
The ride closed in late summer 1999 due to large numbers of disappointed guests who had not realized that the ride's original purpose was transportation and showed a minimal number of animals that, with the exception of the Banteng, could all be seen from the paths surrounding the Tree of Life. With the gangways of the docks removed, the covered structures of the docks still stand in the park and have since been repurposed. The dock in Upcountry Landing, located in Asia, previously hosted character meet & greets and is now used as a seating area and stroller parking. The dock in Safari Village, now Discovery Island, has since been repurposed and renamed Character Landing for character meet & greets, currently hosting Moana as of April 2023.

== See also ==
- List of Disney's Animal Kingdom attractions
- River cruise
