= It's Tough to Be a Bug! =

Former 3D film attraction at Disney theme parks

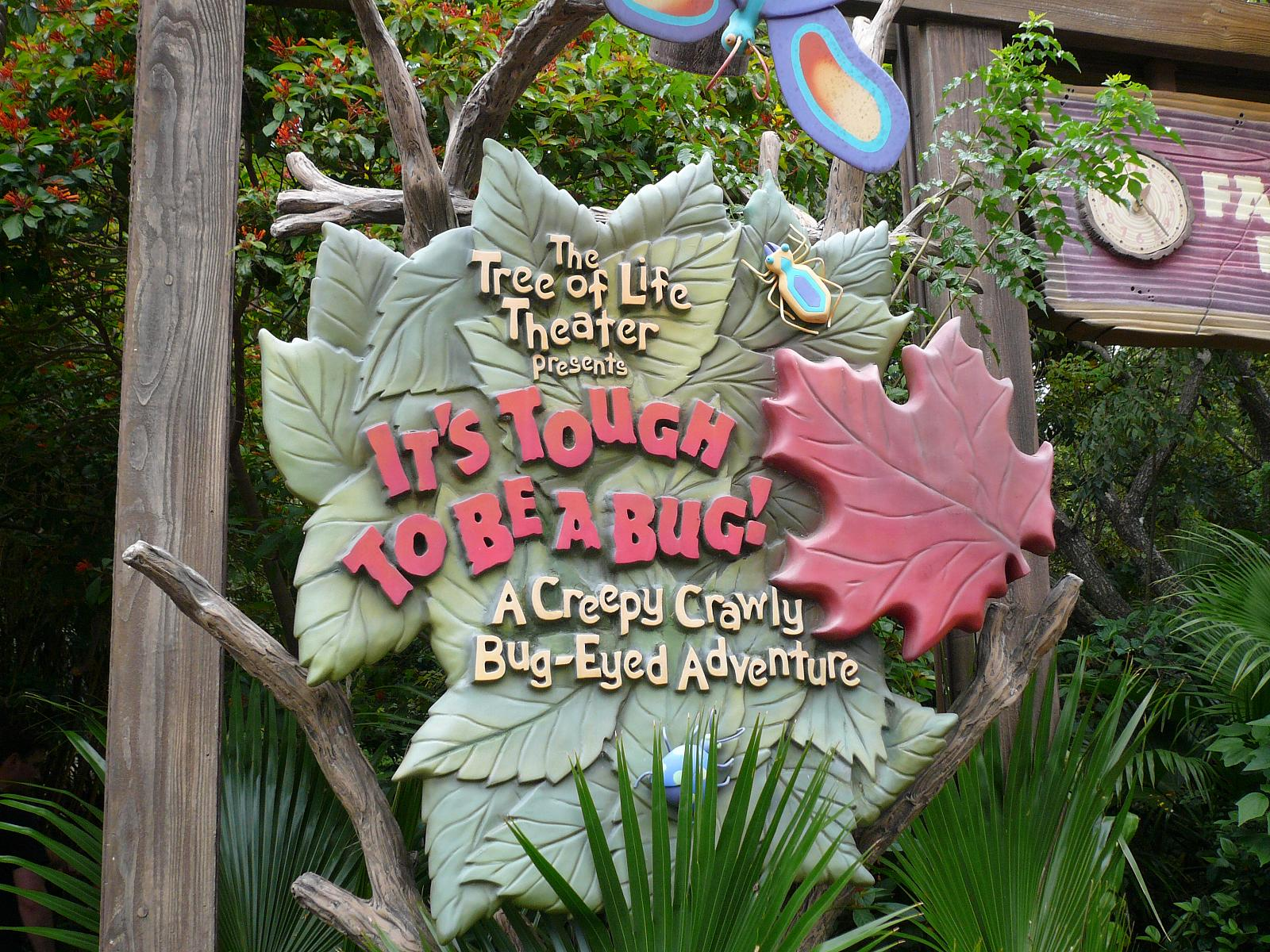
- Entrance marquee at Disney's Animal Kingdom

Disney's Animal Kingdom
- Area: Discovery Island
- Status: Removed
- Opening date: April 22, 1998
- Closing date: March 16, 2025
- Replaced by: Zootopia: Better Zoogether!

Disney California Adventure
- Area: Bountiful Valley Farm (2001–2002); A Bug's Land (2002–2018)
- Status: Removed
- Opening date: February 8, 2001
- Closing date: March 19, 2018
- Replaced by: Web Slingers: A Spider-Man Adventure (Avengers Campus)

Ride statistics
- Attraction type: 3D film
- Designer: Walt Disney Imagineering
- Model: Theater
- Theme: A Bug's Life
- Music: "It's Tough to Be a Bug!" by George Wilkins and Kevin Rafferty; Bruce Broughton (score); George Wilkins (queue)
- Audience capacity: 428 per show
- Duration: 9 minutes
- Show host: Flik
- Lightning Lane formerly available
- Wheelchair accessible
- Assistive listening available
- Closed captioning available

It's Tough to Be a Bug! was a 3D film based on Pixar's 1998 film A Bug's Life. The attraction first opened with Disney's Animal Kingdom at Walt Disney World on April 22, 1998, seven months before A Bug's Life debuted in theaters, and was housed within the theme park's icon, the Tree of Life. A second version of the attraction opened with Disney California Adventure on February 8, 2001, as part of the Bountiful Valley Farm area of the park, until A Bug's Land was built around it, and was housed inside the Bug's Life Theater. The attraction was Pixar's first presence in a Disney park. The film utilized theater lighting, 3D filming techniques, Audio-Animatronics and various special effects and was hosted by Flik, an ant and the protagonist of A Bug's Life, who lead an educational presentation on why insects should be considered an important part of the lives of humans.

== History ==
=== Production ===
About a year before the 1998 opening of Disney's Animal Kingdom, Disney Imagineers had decided to place a show inside the park's centerpiece, the Tree of Life, but struggled to find an acceptable concept. Disney CEO Michael Eisner suggested a tie-in with the then-upcoming Pixar film A Bug's Life, and the creative team developed a story based on the characters from the film. Visual effects studio Rhythm and Hues was brought in to produce the 3D animated portion of the show, while Disney's special effects teams created the rest of the experience, including Audio-Animatronics characters, wind, water, and foul smells.

=== Film ===
It's Tough to Be a Bug!
- Directed by: Chris Bailey; Andrew Schmidt
- Written by: Kevin Rafferty
- Produced by: John Lasseter; Darla K. Anderson; Tom Fitzgerald
- Starring: Dave Foley; Andrew Stanton; Cheech Marin; Tom Kenny; French Stewart; Jason Alexander
- Production company: Pixar Animation Studios
- Release dates: April 22, 1998 (Florida); February 8, 2001 (California)
- Running time: 9:00

Directed by Chris Bailey and Andrew Schmidt, the film It's Tough to Be a Bug! was Pixar's first attraction presence in a Disney park. Dave Foley voiced the lead protagonist, Flik, in both the attraction film and the feature film, which was released seven months after It's Tough to Be a Bug! had opened. The feature film's screenwriter and co-director Andrew Stanton voiced Hopper in the attraction film, voice-doubling for Kevin Spacey, who voices the character in the feature film.

=== Closure and replacements ===
It's Tough to Be a Bug! closed at Disney California Adventure on March 19, 2018, along with the rest of A Bug's Land on September 4, 2018, and was replaced by Web Slingers: A Spider-Man Adventure, an interactive screen ride themed to Spider-Man, as part of the new Avengers Campus, based on the Marvel Cinematic Universe. In September 2023, at the Disney fan event Destination D23, it was announced that a new show based on Walt Disney Animation Studios' Zootopia franchise would be created for the Tree of Life at Disney's Animal Kingdom. It's Tough to Be a Bug! closed on March 16, 2025, and was replaced with a new show, titled Zootopia: Better Zoogether!, which opened on November 7, 2025.

== Summary ==
=== Queue ===
At Disney's Animal Kingdom, the Tree of Life Theater was located within the park's icon, the Tree of Life. Many animals are carved throughout the exterior queue between the roots of the trees, which are not visible from other vantage points. Posters of various bug acts from the show were displayed before reaching the "underground" lobby area, where posters for all-insect parodies of Broadway musicals were also displayed, such as "The Grass Menagerie", "Barefoot in the Bark", "Little Shop of Hoppers" and "My Fair Ladybug". The lobby music overture consisted of insect renditions of signature Broadway musical numbers. Dr. Jane Goodall, who was a consultant in the development and design of Disney's Animal Kingdom, is honored just outside the doors that lead into the attraction's lobby on a plaque describing the origin of her achievements in primatology and zoology, next to a larger-than-life sculpted likeness of Dr. Goodall's chimpanzee subject, David Greybeard.

At Disney California Adventure, the queue passed through a replica of Ant Island, the colony where the main protagonist lives in, before heading "underground", where the column appeared the same as the one at Disney's Animal Kingdom.

=== Attraction ===
Flik the ant, in audio-animatronic form, emerged from a hole in the theater's ceiling and welcomed the audience and began to explain that insects play an important role in humans' life that they cannot see and invited them to see his perspective on the matter, by donning the provided bug eyes (3D glasses). The show began with butterflies forming a curtain together before flying away, followed by the presentation of show's title card. Flik appeared onscreen to present the show's acts, beginning with Chili, a Mexican red knee tarantula (referred in the show as a Chilean rose tarantula), whose an expert quill shooter. A pair of acorn weevils, along with Weevil Kneevil, place a slingshot on the stage and launched acorns from it (triggering hidden air cannons). Chili was able to shoot the first acorn but failed to hit the second because Weevil held on to it, then taunts Chili, who chases after him. Flik presents the second act as a "soldier termite who defends his mound by spraying intruders with acid". A piece of the set falls and the Termite-ator steps out, then shoots at a taunting flea, then the audience, sensing more intruders (triggering hidden water sprayers), despite Flik's protests, until he runs out of acid and leaves. The third act introduced was Claire de Room, a stinkbug who walked onto the stage to demonstrate her "silent but deadly" talent by targeting a flower that the acorn weevils placed in the far back stage. However, still fleeing from Chili, the Weevil re-entered the stage and crashed into the flower, causing it to move towards the audience. Claire then passed gas, which affects and disgusts both Weevil and the audience (triggering hidden smell cannons in the theater).

With an explosion to the right side of the audience, Hopper the grasshopper appeared in audio-animatronic form, disgusted at Flik's compassion towards humans. He ordered a stag beetle to chase Flik off the stage, and four hornets hold up an extermination advertisement flyer. The wasps turn over the flyer and use it as a movie screen to show movie clips from old monster movies that feature giant insects as monsters. (Note: Earth vs. the Spider, Beginning of the End and Empire of the Ants, all directed by Bert I. Gordon.) In an attempt to make humans experience the same torture that insects receive, a giant fly swatter attempts to flatten the audience. However, after discovering that the audience was still alive, Hopper declared war on them. The screen went black as a hand appeared with a can of bug spray, releasing the contents towards the audience (triggering a hidden fog machine above the screen). As the theater went completely dark, hornets stung the audience (triggering small pokers that tap everyone's back), and, at Hopper's mandate, several black widow spiders dropped up and down over the audience's heads, trying to capture and scare the audience, before disappearing to the theater's ceiling. Now onscreen, Hopper boasted about being unbeatable, but a chameleon appeared from the back of the stage and shot its tongue to eat him before fleeing.

Flik reappeared onscreen and says he forgot to mention that reptiles do not care that it is tough to be a bug, which segues into the finale. Bees, dung beetles (The Dung Brothers), dragonflies and other insects sing the attraction's titular song and how insects actually help humans, before Weevil returned holding a moldy cupcake, followed by the entire cast of insects chasing after him. The butterflies came back to form a curtain once again, and Flik reappeared in audio-animatronic form from the ceiling to bid farewell to the audience. After the theater was lit up again, the theater's announcer requested guests to remain seated so other insects can exit, triggering hidden rubber wheels that roll at the bottom of the seats.

== Voice cast ==
- Dave Foley as Flik, an ant.
- Andrew Stanton as Hopper, a grasshopper. (Note: Stanton performed the role as a voice double for Kevin Spacey, who originally voices the character in A Bug's Life.)
- Cheech Marin as Chili, a Mexican redknee tarantula.
- French Stewart as The Termite-ator, a termite.
- Tom Kenny as The Dung Beetle Brothers, two dung beetles.
- Jason Alexander as Weevil Kneevil, an acorn weevil.

== Music ==
The attraction's titular theme song was written by George Wilkins and Kevin Rafferty and is included in the disc "Theme Park Classics" of the Disney Classics compilation box set. The show's score was composed and conducted by Bruce Broughton, while much of the queue music was arranged by Wilkins. The queue features parodies or renditions of songs from famous Broadway shows using bug sounds.

- "One" (A Cockroach Line), a parody of "One" (A Chorus Line)
- "Beauty and the Bees" (Beauty and the Bees), a parody of "Beauty and the Beast" (Beauty and the Beast)
- "Tomorrow" (Antie), a parody of "Tomorrow" (Annie)
- "I Feel Pretty" (Web Side Story) a parody of "I Feel Pretty" (West Side Story)
- "Hello Dung Lovers" (The Dung and I), a parody of "Hello Young Lovers" (The King and I)
- "Tonight" (Web Side Story), a parody of "Tonight" (West Side Story) mixed with Flight of the Bumblebee

== See also ==
- The Tree of Life
- Muppet*Vision 3D
- Mickey's PhilharMagic
- List of Disney's Animal Kingdom attractions
- List of Disney California Adventure attractions
- 2018 in amusement parks
