= A Bug's Land =

Former area in Disney California Adventure

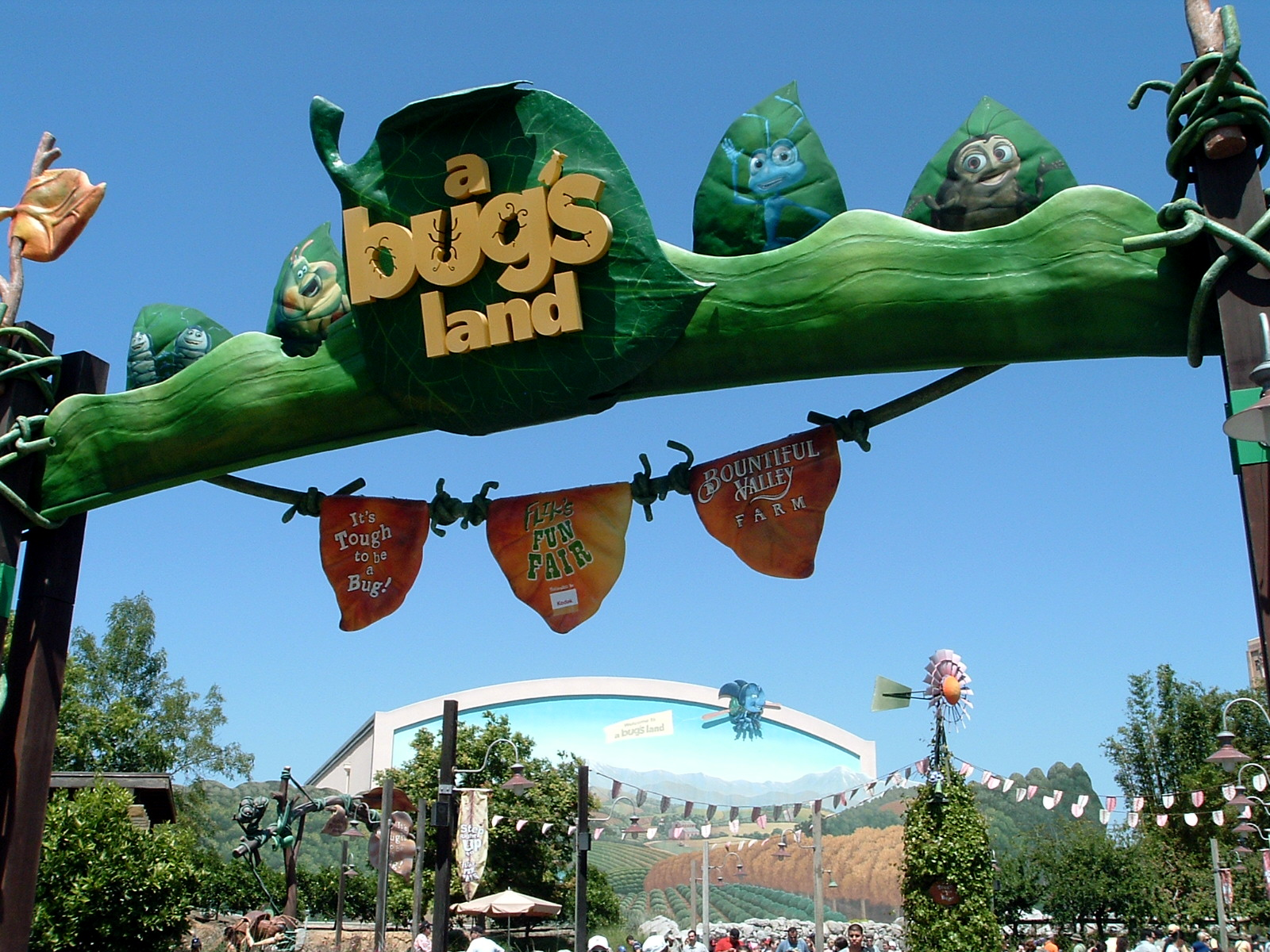
- Interactive map of A Bug's Land
- Theme: A Bug's Life

Attractions
- Total: 5
- Other rides: 2

Disney California Adventure
- Coordinates: 33.8068°N 117.9180°W
- Status: Defunct
- Opened: October 7, 2002
- Closed: September 4, 2018
- Replaced by: Avengers Campus

"A Bug's Land" (stylized "a bug's land") was an area of Disney California Adventure themed after Pixar's 1998 film A Bug's Life. The land consisted of Flik's Fun Fair, which opened on October 7, 2002, and was set in a representation of the film's fictional universe with four rides targeted towards young children; Flik's Flyers, Francis' Ladybug Boogie, Tuck and Roll's Drive 'Em Buggies, and Heimlich's Chew Chew Train. The area also included a water play area targeted towards young children. An outside area contained the It's Tough to Be a Bug! theater, which was an original area of the park when it opened on February 8, 2001. The area closed on September 4, 2018 to make way for Avengers Campus.

== History ==
It's Tough to Be a Bug!, and Bountiful Valley Farm were original attractions at Disney California Adventure when the park opened on February 8, 2001; both were originally part of the sprawling "Golden State" area. The park suffered from low attendance in its early years, partially attributed to the lack of rides appropriate for young children and the low proportion of E ticket attractions to stores and restaurants. In response, Disney announced it would concurrently build The Twilight Zone Tower of Terror – a recreation of an attraction at Disney's Hollywood Studios – in the Hollywood Pictures Backlot; and Flik's Fun Fair – a collection of four rides and a water play area geared towards children and themed to the movie A Bug's Life – adjacent to the existing It's Tough to Be a Bug! theater. The fictional backstory for Flik's Fun Fair holds that Flik and the other bugs were inspired to create their own fun fair when Disney's California Adventure opened next door to them. When the Imagineers set out to build The Twilight Zone Tower of Terror, they discovered the bugs in the garden and decided to open up Flik's fair to park guests.

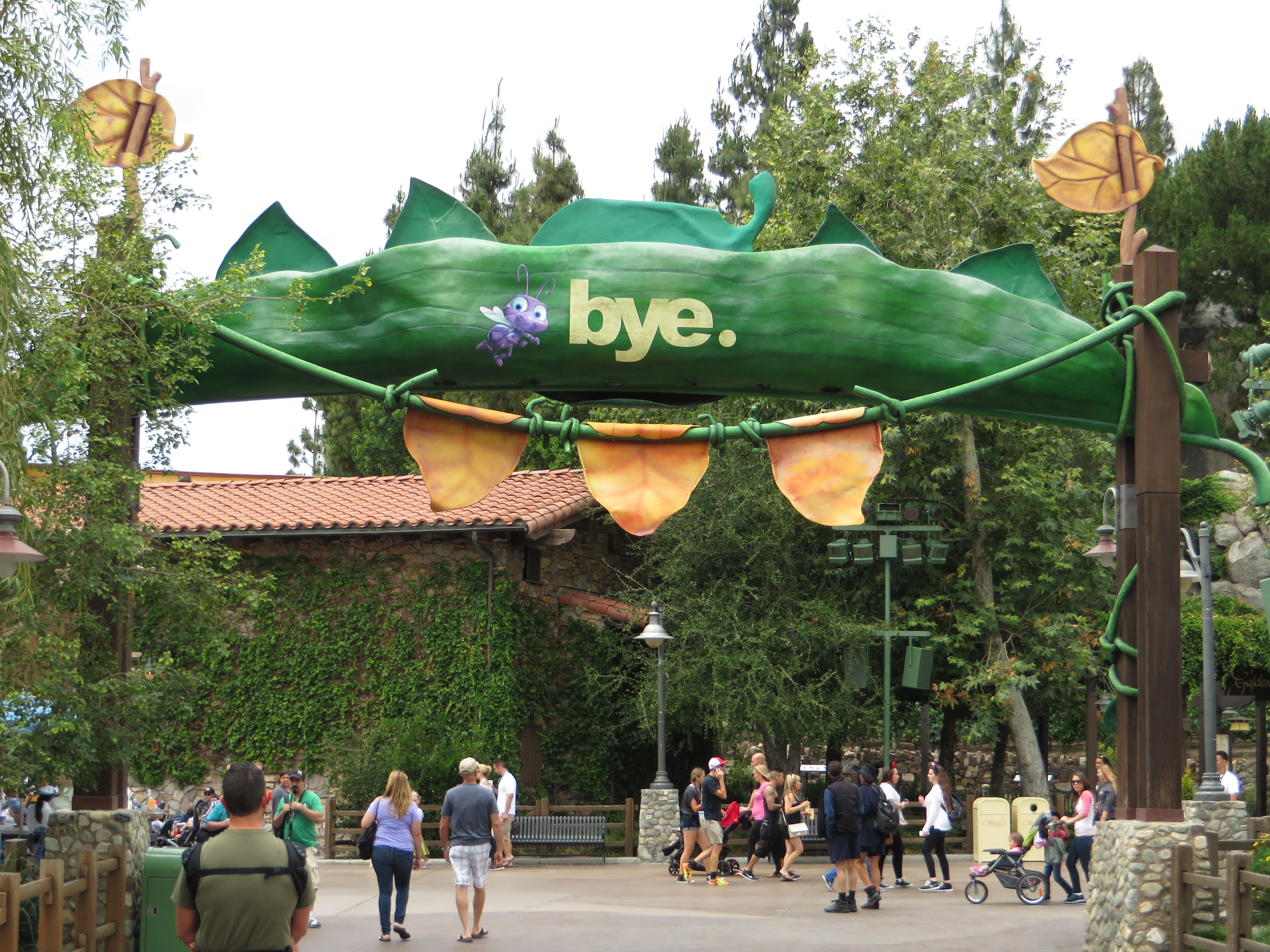
A Bug's Land in 2015

Flik's Fun Fair opened on October 7, 2002, and became part of A Bug's Land, the new name for the collection of A Bug's Life-related attractions. Concurrently, Its Tough to Be a Bug! and Bountiful Valley Farm were transferred from Golden State to A Bug's Land, and the area's store was re-themed with more focus on the film's characters.

In 2010, Bountiful Valley Farm as well as the area's shops and restaurants were closed and demolished; their site is now part of Cars Land, which opened on June 15, 2012. With the construction of Cars Land, two new entrances from Hollywood Land and Cars Land to the Flik's Fun Fair area were opened; the area originally had one entrance.

On March 20, 2018, it was announced that A Bug's Land would close permanently, and be replaced with what is now Avengers Campus. It's Tough to Be a Bug! closed a day earlier. On July 18, Disney would officially announce that A Bug’s Land’s final day of operation would be September 3, with the land and the rest of the attractions in it closing permanently the next day on September 4, 2018.

Tributes to A Bug's Land can be found in Avengers Campus. Enlarged Christmas lights are seen hanging at the Pym Tasting Lab, and in the pre-show of Web Slingers: A Spider-Man Adventure, there is a claw machine with numerous items, one of which is a pair of 3D glasses from It's Tough to Be a Bug!. In addition, there is a tribute to Bountiful Valley Farm on the labels of the enlarged ketchup and mustard bottles found inside the Pym Test Kitchen.

== Attractions at the time of closure ==
The following attractions were open at the time of A Bug's Land's closure in 2018.

=== Flik's Flyers ===
Flik's Flyers
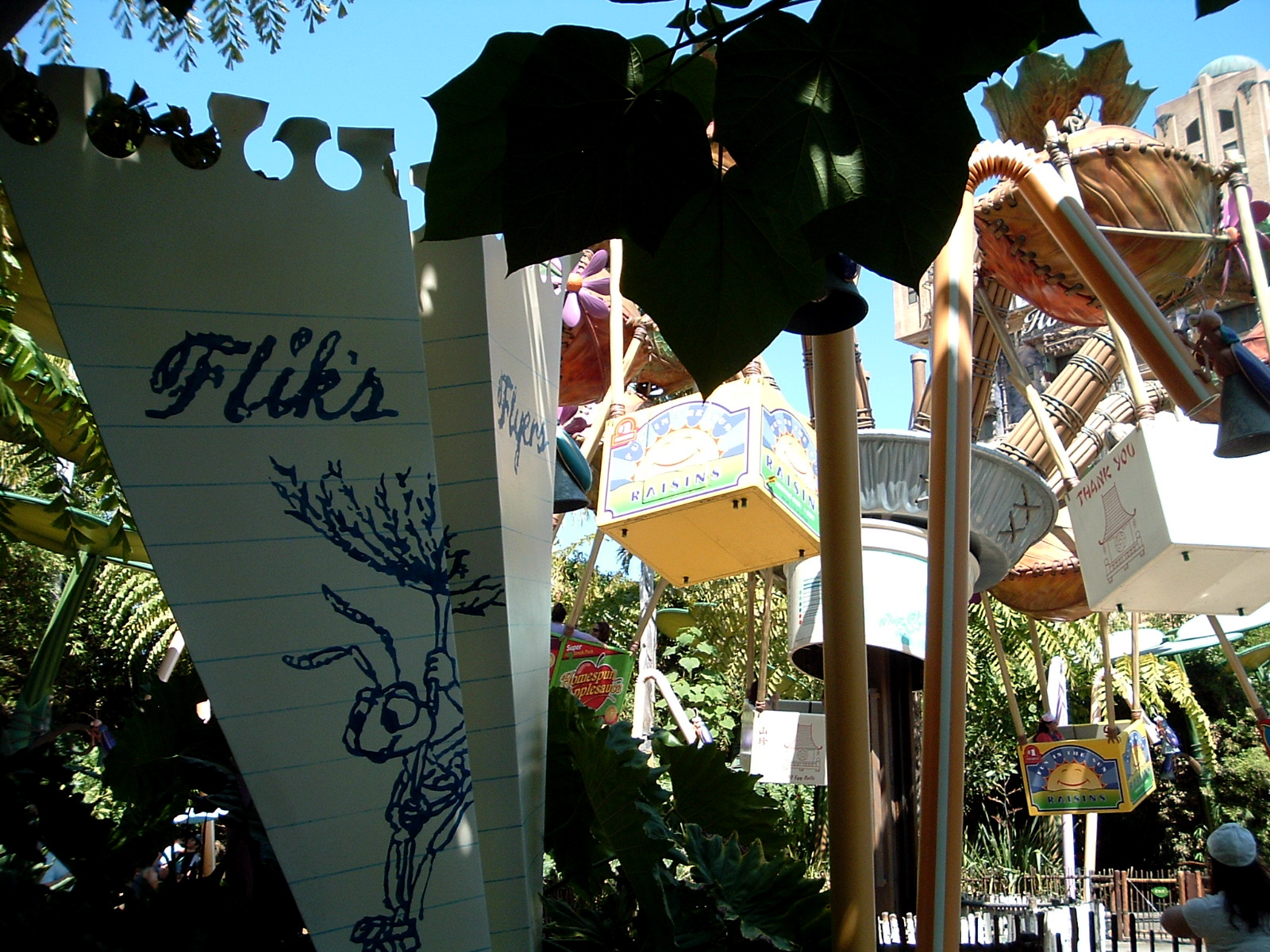

Disney California Adventure
- Area: A Bug's Land
- Status: Removed
- Opening date: October 7, 2002
- Closing date: September 4, 2018
- Replaced by: Inside Out Emotional Whirlwind (Pixar Pier)

Ride statistics
- Attraction type: Hanging balloon
- Manufacturer: Zamperla
- Designer: Walt Disney Imagineering
- Theme: A Bug's Life
- Vehicle type: Hand built balloons
- Riders per vehicle: 6
- Duration: 1:30
- Must transfer from wheelchair

Flik's Flyers was a spinner ride at "Flik's Fun Fair" inside A Bug's Land at Disney California Adventure Park at the Disneyland Resort in Anaheim, California. Guests rode in Flik's bug-made contraption fashioned from man-made objects. The vehicles appeared to have been fashioned from used food containers and have been stitched together by leaves and twigs to become balloons that whirled around a pie plate centerpiece.

Whirring, cranking gears were heard as the vehicles left the ground. The attraction provided guests with a view of Guardians of the Galaxy – Mission: Breakout!. Flik's Flyers was similar to Blowfish Balloon Race at Tokyo DisneySea.

After the attraction's closure, it was re-themed into Inside Out Emotional Whirlwind, inspired by Pixar's 2015 film Inside Out, and relocated to the Pixar Pier area of the park.

=== Heimlich's Chew Chew Train ===
Heimlich's Chew Chew Train
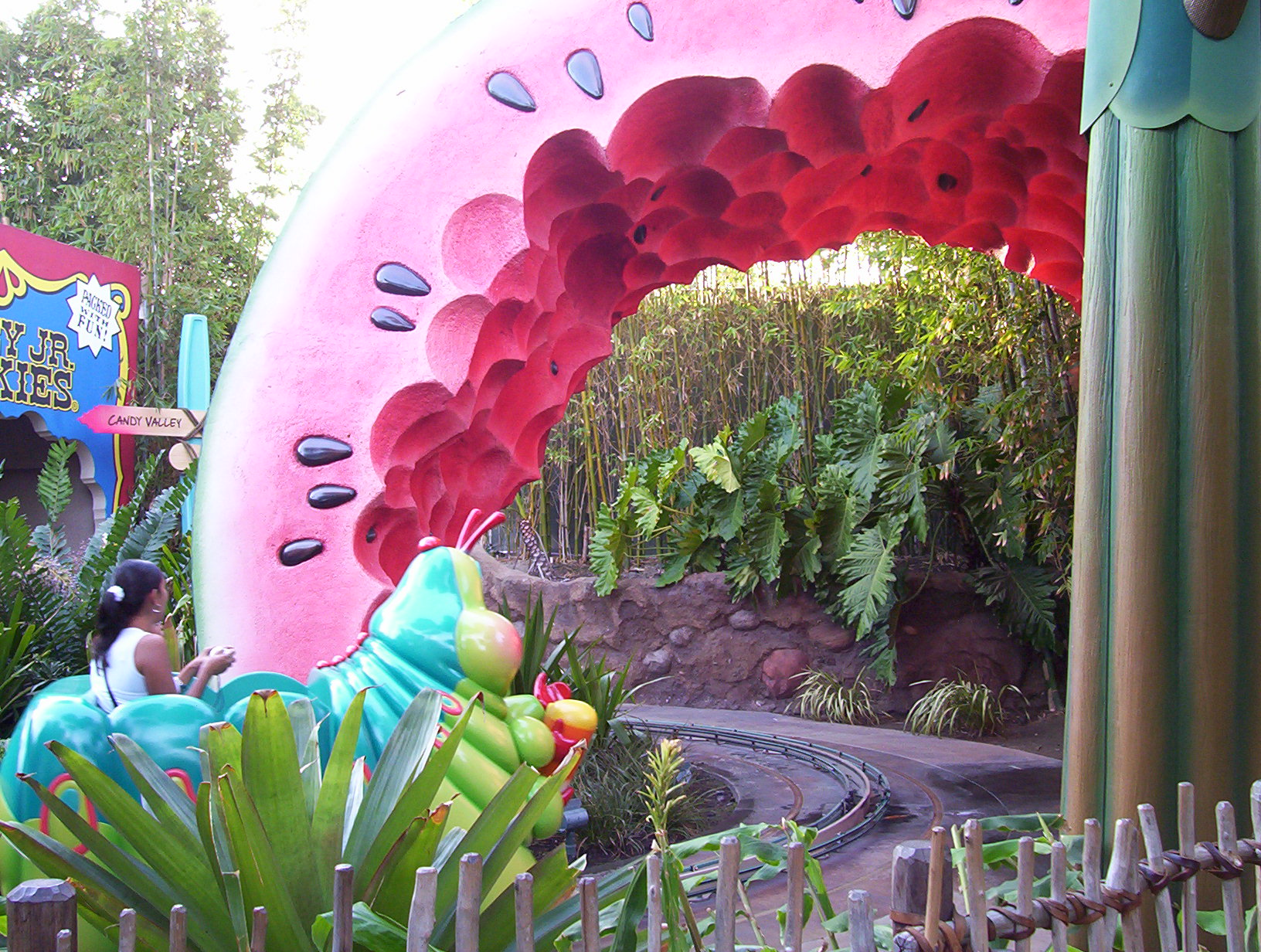

Disney California Adventure
- Area: A Bug's Land
- Status: Removed
- Opening date: October 7, 2002
- Closing date: September 4, 2018
- Replaced by: Avengers Campus

Ride statistics
- Designer: Walt Disney Imagineering
- Theme: A Bug's Life
- Vehicle type: Heimlich's body
- Vehicles: 2
- Duration: 2:11
- Must transfer from wheelchair

Guests boarded a train in the shape of Heimlich, the German-accented caterpillar from the film. Heimlich (voiced by Joe Ranft) narrated the ride through speakers along the track. Heimlich's tendency to be hungry was the theme of the ride, as the train appears to eat through oversized portions of human foods: candy corn, animal crackers, carrots, and watermelon. The scent of watermelon and animal crackers were piped in.

After the ride closed in 2018, one of the cars from the attraction was moved to Pixar Animation Studios in memory of Ranft, who died in 2005. In addition, some of the attraction's audio recordings of Heimlich were reused for Heimlich's Candy Corn Toss, one of the boardwalk games located in Pixar Pier.

=== Francis' Ladybug Boogie ===
Francis' Ladybug Boogie was a spinning attraction and first opened in 2002, along with the rest of A Bug's Land.

Guests boarded one of the six Francis Lady bugs with up to six adults and children aboard each bug. The ride spun guests around in a figure eight style. The theme of the ride was the character Francis from the Disney·Pixar film A Bug's Life. The ride featured jazz music as guests are spun around to the music. The music used on the ride is from the One O’Clock Boogie/Two O’Clock Jump album by The Tom Cunningham Orchestra.

=== Princess Dot Puddle Park ===
Princess Dot's Puddle Park was a water-type play area designed by Walt Disney Imagineering located inside of A Bug's Land section of Disney California Adventure. The area featured an oversized garden hose nozzle that sprayed water at guests as well as a giant spigot that spurted water. This area provided the sensation of being a bug among the oversized garden tools.

=== Tuck and Roll's Drive 'Em Buggies ===
Tuck and Roll's Drive 'Em Buggies was a bumper car ride located inside of the A Bug's Land section of Disney California Adventure. In the attraction, up to two people could fit inside a bug-shaped bumper car, as they rode around bumping other cars. There were restrictions on who could drive the car. If riding alone, the driver must have been seven years or older. There was also a height restriction on this ride; all riders had to be at least 36 inches (91 cm) tall. There were a total of 21 bumper cars on the floor at a time. During the ride the car talked to the guests with the voices of pill bugs Tuck or Roll, depending on the assigned car.

== Other former attractions ==
- Bountiful Valley Farm
  - Farmer's Market
  - Sam Andreas Shakes
  - P.T. Flea Market (originally Santa Rosa Seed & Supply)
  - It's Tough to Be a Bug!
