= Don L. Harper =

American film composer

- Born: Los Angeles
- Origin: United States
- Occupations: Film composer, Songwriter, Conductor, and Arranger

Don Loren Harper is an American film composer, songwriter, conductor, and arranger whose credits include films such as The Guardian, National Treasure, Training Day, Armageddon, The Rock, Twister, Broken Arrow, Assassins, and Speed. Harper composed and conducted the music for Disney's direct-to-video releases The Lion King 1½, Tarzan & Jane, and Atlantis: Milo's Return. He also created the scores for the television series' The Magnificent Seven and The Twilight Zone, and the TV movie Houdini.

Harper's first CD, Dream and Variations, is a hybrid of jazz, Americana, rock, spirituals, blues, and bluegrass. It is a sweeping assemblage of vignettes, recorded with a 70-piece orchestra live on the Eastwood Stage at Warner Bros. in the Fall of 2006. The production included a 32-member choir, session musician Dan Higgins on soprano saxophone, jazz pianist Russell Ferrante of The Yellowjackets, notable string players Dave Stone (upright bass), Sid Page (violin), and Steve Erdody (cello). Trevor Rabin, composer and former member of Yes, played guitar. Dream and Variations includes the song "End of Days", featuring vocals by Lisbeth Scott, which Harper and lyricist Tom Child wrote in response to the devastation of Hurricane Katrina. He has also recorded the soundtrack for Tokyo DisneySea's version of Fantasmic, Epcot Forever, as well as a song for Rivers of Light.

== Discography ==
- Dream and Variations
