= A Bug's Life =

1998 film by John Lasseter

- Theatrical release poster
- Directed by: John Lasseter
- Screenplay by: Andrew Stanton; Donald McEnery; Bob Shaw
- Story by: John Lasseter; Andrew Stanton; Joe Ranft
- Produced by: Darla K. Anderson; Kevin Reher
- Starring: Dave Foley; Kevin Spacey; Julia Louis-Dreyfus; Hayden Panettiere; Phyllis Diller; Richard Kind; David Hyde Pierce; Joe Ranft; Denis Leary
- Cinematography: Sharon Calahan
- Edited by: Lee Unkrich
- Music by: Randy Newman
- Production company: Pixar Animation Studios
- Distributed by: Buena Vista Pictures Distribution (Note: Distributed under the Walt Disney Pictures banner.)
- Release dates: November 14, 1998 (El Capitan Theatre); November 25, 1998 (United States)
- Running time: 95 minutes
- Country: United States
- Language: English
- Budget: $40–120 million
- Box office: $363.3 million

A Bug's Life (stylized in all lowercase) is a 1998 American animated comedy film directed by John Lasseter and written by Andrew Stanton, Donald McEnery, and Bob Shaw. Produced by Pixar Animation Studios for Walt Disney Pictures, it stars the voices of Dave Foley, Kevin Spacey, Julia Louis-Dreyfus, Hayden Panettiere, Phyllis Diller, Richard Kind, David Hyde Pierce, Joe Ranft, and Denis Leary. In the film, a misfit anthropomorphic ant named Flik looks for "tough warriors" to save his ant colony from a protection racket run by a gang of grasshoppers. However, the "warriors" he brings back are a troupe of Circus Bugs. The film's plot was initially inspired by Aesop's fable The Ant and the Grasshopper.

Production on A Bug's Life began shortly after the release of Toy Story in 1995. The ants in the film were redesigned to be more appealing, and Pixar's animation unit employed technical innovations in computer animation. Randy Newman composed the music for the film. During production, a controversial public feud erupted between Steve Jobs and Lasseter of Pixar and DreamWorks co-founder Jeffrey Katzenberg due to the parallel production of his similar film Antz, which was released the month prior.

A Bug's Life premiered at the El Capitan Theatre in Los Angeles on November 14, 1998, and was released in the United States on November 25. It received positive reviews for its animation, story, humor, and voice acting. It became a commercial success, having grossed $363 million at the box office. It was the first film to be digitally transferred frame-by-frame and released on DVD, and has been released multiple times on home video.

== Plot ==
A colony of ants, led by the elderly Queen and her daughter Princess Atta, lives in the middle of a seasonally dry creekbed on a small hill known as "Ant Island". Every summer, they are forced to give food to a gang of grasshoppers, led by Hopper. Simultaneously, the distrusting ants distance themselves from Flik, a kind-hearted inventor who is prone to incompetence. One day, he unintentionally spills the food offering with his grain harvester. Hopper discovers this, and demands twice as much food as compensation. When Flik earnestly suggests the ants enlist the help of bigger bugs to fight the grasshoppers, Atta sees it as a way to get rid of Flik and sends him off.

Flik travels to "the city", a heap of trash under a trailer. There, he mistakes a troupe of jobless Circus Bugs for the warrior bugs he seeks. The bugs, in turn, mistake Flik for a talent agent, and agree to travel with him back to Ant Island. During a welcome ceremony after their arrival, the Circus Bugs and Flik discover their mutual misunderstandings. The Circus Bugs attempt to leave, but are pursued by a nearby bird; while fleeing, they rescue Atta's younger sister Dot from the bird, gaining the ants' respect. At Flik's request, the Circus Bugs continue the ruse of being "warriors", thus enabling them to continue enjoying the ants' hospitality. Learning that Hopper fears birds inspires Flik to build a crude ornithopter disguised as a bird to scare away the grasshoppers. Meanwhile, Hopper reminds his gang of the ants' higher numbers, warning them the ants will rebel if not kept in line.

The ants finish constructing the fake bird. During the subsequent celebration, the Circus Bugs' old supervisor, P.T. Flea, arrives, seeking to rehire them and blowing their cover; believing that the plan is doomed to fail, Atta foolishly advises Flik and the Circus Bugs to leave which Flik sadly does. The ants desperately try gathering food for a new offering. Hopper returns, sees the small offering, and takes over the island. He then demands the ants' own winter food supply, planning to execute the Queen afterward. Overhearing the plan from one of the grasshoppers, Dot persuades Flik and the Circus Bugs to return to Ant Island.

After the Circus Bugs distract the grasshoppers long enough to rescue the Queen, Flik deploys the bird. It initially fools the grasshoppers, but P.T., who is also fooled, sets the bird on fire. Realizing the deception, Hopper has Flik publicly beaten and proclaims the ants are lowly life forms who live only to serve the grasshoppers. Flik asserts Hopper knowingly downplays the ant colony's strengths and capabilities. This inspires the ants and the Circus Bugs to fight back against the grasshoppers, driving all but Hopper and his affable brother Molt away.

The ants shove Hopper into the circus cannon to shoot him off of the island, but rain suddenly begins to fall. In the ensuing chaos, Hopper frees himself from the cannon and abducts Flik. The Circus Bugs and Atta pursue, with the latter catching up to Hopper and rescuing Flik, who lures Hopper to the real bird's nest. Believing the bird is another fake, Hopper taunts it, until it grabs him and feeds him to its chicks.

With the anthill now at peace, Flik improves his inventions to help gather food for the ants. Flik and Atta become a couple. P.T. and the Circus Bugs begin their new tour with Molt as a strongman and some of the ants as acrobats. Atta and Dot become the new queen and princess, respectively. The ants celebrate their victory and congratulate Flik as a hero as Heimlich emerges from a cocoon with just butterfly wings as Francis and Manny carry him off. They then bid a fond farewell to the circus troupe.

== Voice cast ==
- Dave Foley as Flik, a courageous but clumsy inventor ant wanting to make a difference.
- Kevin Spacey as Hopper, the ruthless and brutal leader of the grasshopper gang oppressing the ants.
- Julia Louis-Dreyfus as Princess Atta, Queen's nervous elder daughter and Flik's love interest.
- Hayden Panettiere as Dot, Princess Atta's younger sister and Flik's friend.
- Phyllis Diller as The Queen, Atta and Dot's elderly mother and ruler of the ant colony who is training Atta to succeed her.
- Richard Kind as Molt, Hopper's cowardly and dimwitted younger brother.
- David Hyde Pierce as Slim, a stick bug clown who often becomes a stand-in for stick-like props.
- Joe Ranft as Heimlich, a gluttonous, German-accented green caterpillar clown who desires to be a butterfly.
- Denis Leary as Francis, a hot-tempered male ladybug clown who is frequently mistaken for a female throughout the film and becomes a reluctant "den mother" to the Blueberry Scouts.
- Jonathan Harris as Manny, an elderly, English-accented mantis magician who is Gypsy's husband.
- Madeline Kahn as Gypsy, a gypsy moth who is Manny's wife and assistant in the magic acts.
- Bonnie Hunt as Rosie, a black widow spider who is Dim's "tamer".
- Michael McShane as Tuck and Roll, twin pillbug performers from Hungary who speak in gibberish and act as insect cannonballs and dancers.
- John Ratzenberger as P.T. Flea, a flea who is the ringmaster of the struggling circus troupe.
- Brad Garrett as Dim, a blue child-like rhinoceros beetle that plays the "ferocious beast" and serves as a mode of transportation for Rosie, Tuck, Roll, and Heimlich.
- Roddy McDowall as Mr. Soil, the ant colony's resident thespian.
- Edie McClurg as Dr. Flora, the ant colony's doctor.
- Alex Rocco as Thorny, a small, deep-voiced ant who is Atta's personal assistant.
- David Ossman as Cornelius, an elderly ant with a walking stick.
- David Lander as Thumper, a feral grasshopper who is Hopper's primary enforcer.
- Rodger Bumpass as Harry Mosquito, a mosquito at a bar that orders the "bloody mary"
- Ashley Tisdale as the leader of the Blueberry Scouts, a troop of ant children that Dot belongs to.
- Jan Rabson and Carlos Alazraqui as Axle and Loco, a duo of grasshoppers from Hopper's gang.
  - Rabson also voices another grasshopper while Alazraqui voices an ant that becomes "lost" when a leaf falls on the ant line.
- Bob Bergen as Aphie, the Queen's pet aphid.
- Jack Angel as Thud, a horsefly and bodyguard to the Fly Brothers.
- Patrick Pinney as a bug in the bar and a grasshopper from Hopper's gang.
- Rachel Davey, Brad Hall, Jeff Pidgeon, and Phil Proctor as Hopper's grasshopper cronies.

== Production ==
=== Development ===
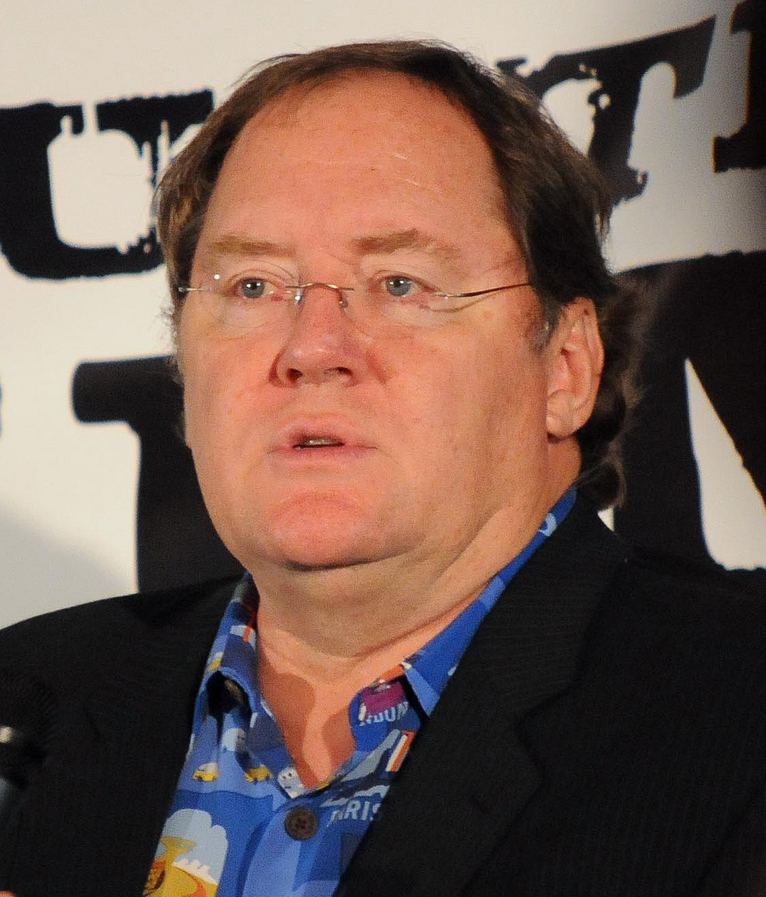
John Lasseter, the director of A Bug's Life, at the Austin Film Festival in October 2011

During the summer of 1994, Pixar's story department began turning their thoughts to their next film. The storyline for A Bug's Life originated from a lunchtime conversation between John Lasseter, Andrew Stanton, Pete Docter, and Joe Ranft, the studio's head story team; other films such as Monsters, Inc., Finding Nemo and WALL-E were also conceived at this lunch. Lasseter and his story team had already been drawn to the idea of insects serving as characters. Like toys, insects were within the reach of computer animation back then, due to their relatively simple surfaces. Stanton and Ranft wondered whether they could find a starting point in Aesop's fable The Ant and the Grasshopper. Walt Disney had produced his own version with a cheerier ending decades earlier in the 1934 short film The Grasshopper and the Ants. In addition, Walt Disney Feature Animation had considered producing a film in the late-1980s entitled Army Ants, that centered around a pacifist ant living in a militaristic colony, but this never fully materialized.

As Stanton and Ranft discussed the adaptation, they rattled off scenarios and storylines springing from their premise. Lasseter liked the idea and offered some suggestions. The concept simmered until early 1995, when the story team began work on the second film in earnest. During an early test screening for Toy Story in San Rafael in June 1995, they pitched the film to the Walt Disney Company CEO Michael Eisner. Eisner thought the idea was fine and they submitted a treatment to Disney in early July under the title Bugs. Disney approved the treatment and gave notice on July 7 that it was exercising the option of a second film under the original 1991 agreement between Disney and Pixar. Lasseter assigned the co-director job to Stanton; both worked well together and had similar sensibilities. Lasseter had realized that working on a computer-animated feature as a sole director was dangerous while the production of Toy Story was in process. In addition, Lasseter believed that it would relieve stress and that the role would groom Stanton for having his own position as a lead director.

=== Writing ===
In The Ant and the Grasshopper, a grasshopper squanders the spring and summer months on singing while the ants put food away for the winter; when winter comes, the hungry grasshopper begs the ants for food, but the ants turn him away. Stanton and Ranft hit on the notion that the grasshopper could just take the food, with Ranft saying "What if that grasshopper came back with a gang to thump on the ants". After Stanton had completed a draft of the script, he came to doubt one of the story's main pillars: that the Circus Bugs that had come to the colony to cheat the ants would instead stay and fight. He thought the Circus Bugs were unlikable characters as liars and that it was unrealistic for them to undergo a complete personality change. Also, no particularly good reason existed for Circus Bugs to stay with the ant colony during the second act. Although the film was already far along, Stanton concluded that the story needed a different approach.

Stanton took one of the early circus bug characters, Red the red ant, and changed him into the character Flik. The Circus Bugs, no longer out to cheat the colony, would be embroiled in a comic misunderstanding as to why Flik was recruiting them. Lasseter agreed with this new approach, and comedy writers Donald McEnery and Bob Shaw spent a few months working on further polishing the script with Stanton. The characters "Tuck and Roll" were inspired by a drawing that Stanton did of two bugs fighting when he was in the second grade. Lasseter had come to envision the film as an epic in the tradition of the 1962 film Lawrence of Arabia.

=== Casting ===
The voice cast was heavy with television sitcom stars of the time: Flik was voiced by Dave Foley (from NewsRadio), Princess Atta was voiced by Julia Louis-Dreyfus (from Seinfeld), Molt was voiced by Richard Kind (from Spin City), Slim was voiced by David Hyde Pierce (from Frasier) and Dim was voiced by Brad Garrett (from Everybody Loves Raymond). Ranft played Heimlich the caterpillar at the suggestion of Lasseter's wife, Nancy, who had heard him playing the character on a scratch vocal track.

For Hopper, the film's villain, Lasseter's top choice was Robert De Niro, who repeatedly turned the part down, as did a succession of other actors. Kevin Spacey met Lasseter at the 1995 Academy Awards and Lasseter asked Spacey if he would be interested in doing the voice of Hopper. Spacey was delighted and signed on immediately.

A Bug's Life was the final film appearance of actor Roddy McDowall, who played Mr. Soil, dying shortly before the film's theatrical release.

=== Art design and animation ===
It was more difficult for animators during the production of A Bug's Life than that of Toy Story, as Pixar's computers ran sluggishly due to the complexity of the character models. Lasseter and Stanton had two supervising animators, Rich Quade and Glenn McQueen, to assist with directing and reviewing the animation. The first sequence to be animated and rendered was the circus sequence that culminated with P.T. Flea's "Flaming Wall of Death". Lasseter placed this scene first in the pipeline because he believed it was "less likely to change". After Lasseter thought it would be useful to look at a view of the world from an insect's perspective, two technicians obliged by creating a miniature video camera on Lego wheels, dubbed the "Bugcam". Fastened to the end of a stick, the Bugcam could roll through grass and other terrain and send back an insect's-eye outlook. Lasseter was intrigued by the way grass, leaves and flower petals formed a translucent canopy, as if the insects were living under a stained-glass ceiling. The team also later sought inspiration from Microcosmos (1996), a French documentary on love and violence in the insect world.

The transition from treatment to storyboards took on an extra layer of complexity due to the profusion of storylines. While Toy Story focused heavily on Woody and Buzz Lightyear, with the other toys serving mostly as sidekicks, A Bug's Life required in-depth storytelling for several major groups of characters. Character design also presented a new challenge, in that the designers had to make ants appear likable. Although the animators and the art department studied insects more closely, natural realism would give way to the film's larger needs. The team took out mandibles and designed the ants to stand upright, replacing their normal six legs with two arms and two legs. The grasshoppers, in contrast, received a pair of extra appendages to appear less attractive. The story's scale also required software engineers to accommodate new demands. Among these was the need to handle shots with crowds of ants. The film would include more than 400 such shots in the ant colony, some with as many as 800. It was impractical for animators to control them individually, but neither could the ants remain static for even a moment without appearing lifeless, or move identically. Bill Reeves, one of the film's two supervising technical directors, dealt with the quandary by leading the development of software for autonomous ants. The animators would only animate four or five groups of about eight individual "universal ants". These "universal ants" were randomly distributed throughout the digital set and subjected to algorithmic modifications—such as variations in eye color, skin tone, height, and weight—to ensure phenotypic uniqueness among all instances. It was partly based on Reeves's invention of particle systems a decade and a half earlier, which had let animators use masses of self-guided particles to create effects like swirling dust and snow.

The animators also employed subsurface scattering—developed by Pixar co-founder Edwin Catmull during his graduate student days at the University of Utah in the 1970s—to render surfaces in a more lifelike way. This would be the first time that subsurface scattering would be used in a Pixar film, and a small team at Pixar worked out the practical problems that kept it from working in animation. Catmull asked for a short film to test and showcase subsurface scattering and the result, Geri's Game (1997), was attached alongside A Bug's Life in its theatrical release.

=== Feud between Pixar and DreamWorks Animation ===
During the production of A Bug's Life, a public feud erupted between DreamWorks Animation's Jeffrey Katzenberg, and Pixar's Steve Jobs and Lasseter. Katzenberg, former chairman of Disney's film division, had left the company in a feud with Eisner. In response, he formed DreamWorks SKG with Steven Spielberg and David Geffen and planned to rival Disney in animation. After DreamWorks' acquisition of Pacific Data Images (PDI)—long Pixar's contemporary in computer animation—Lasseter and others at Pixar were dismayed to learn from the trade papers that PDI's first project at DreamWorks would be another ant film, to be called Antz. By this time, Pixar's project was well known within the animation community. Both Antz and A Bug's Life center on a young male ant, a drone with oddball tendencies that struggles to win a princess's hand by saving their society. Whereas A Bug's Life relied chiefly on visual gags, Antz was more verbal and revolved more around satire. The script of Antz was also heavy with adult references, whereas Pixar's film was more accessible to children.

Lasseter and Jobs believed that the idea was stolen by Katzenberg. Katzenberg had stayed in touch with Lasseter after the acrimonious Disney split, often calling to check up. In October 1995, when Lasseter was overseeing postproduction work on Toy Story at the Universal lot's Technicolor facility in Universal City, where DreamWorks was also located, he called Katzenberg and dropped by with Stanton. When Katzenberg asked what they were doing next, Lasseter described what would become A Bug's Life in detail. Lasseter respected Katzenberg's judgment and felt comfortable using him as a sounding board for creative ideas. Lasseter had high hopes for Toy Story, and he was telling friends throughout the tight-knit computer-animation business to get cracking on their own films. He told various friends, "If this hits, it's going to be like space movies after Star Wars" for computer animation companies. Lasseter later recalled, "I should have been wary. Jeffrey kept asking questions about when it would be released."

When the trades indicated production on Antz, Lasseter, feeling betrayed, called Katzenberg and asked him if it was true, who in turn asked him where he had heard the rumor. Lasseter asked again, and Katzenberg admitted it was true. Lasseter raised his voice and would not believe Katzenberg's story that a development director had pitched him the idea long ago. Katzenberg claimed Antz came from a 1991 story pitch by Tim Johnson that was related to Katzenberg in October 1994. Another source gives Nina Jacobson, one of Katzenberg's executives, as the person responsible for the Antz pitch. Lasseter, who normally did not use profane language, cursed at Katzenberg and hung up the phone. Lasseter recalled that Katzenberg began explaining that Disney was "out to get him" and Lasseter felt that he was cannon fodder in Katzenberg's fight with Disney. For his part, Katzenberg believed he was the victim of a conspiracy: Eisner had decided not to pay him his contract-required bonus, convincing Disney's board not to give him anything. Katzenberg was further angered by the fact that Eisner scheduled Bugs to open the same week as The Prince of Egypt, which was then intended to be DreamWorks' first animated release. Lasseter relayed the news to Pixar employees but kept morale high. Privately, Lasseter told other Pixar executives that he and Stanton felt let down by Katzenberg.

Katzenberg moved the opening of Antz from spring 1999 to October 1998 to compete with Pixar's release. David Price writes in his 2008 book The Pixar Touch that a rumor, "never confirmed", was that Katzenberg had given PDI "rich financial incentives to induce them to whatever it would take to have Antz ready first, despite Pixar's head start". Jobs was furious and called Katzenberg and began yelling. Katzenberg made an offer: He would delay production of Antz if Jobs and Disney would move A Bug's Life so that it did not compete with The Prince of Egypt. Jobs believed it "a blatant extortion attempt" and would not go for it, explaining that there was nothing he could do to convince Disney to change the date. Katzenberg responded that Jobs himself had taught him how to conduct similar business long ago, explaining that Jobs had come to Pixar's rescue by making the deal for Toy Story, as Pixar was near bankruptcy at that time. Katzenberg said, "I was the one guy there for you back then, and now you're allowing them to use you to screw me." He suggested that if Jobs wanted to, he could slow down production on A Bug's Life without telling Disney. If he did, Katzenberg said, he would put Antz on hold. Lasseter also claimed Katzenberg had phoned him with the proposition, but Katzenberg denied these charges later.

As the release dates for both films approached, Disney executives concluded that Pixar should keep silent on the DreamWorks battle. Lasseter publicly dismissed Antz as a "schlock version" of A Bug's Life. Lasseter, who claimed to have never seen Antz, told others that if DreamWorks and PDI had made the film about anything other than insects, he would have closed Pixar for the day so the entire company could go see it. Jobs and Katzenberg would not back down and the rivaling ant films provoked a press frenzy. "The bad guys rarely win," Jobs told the Los Angeles Times. In response, DreamWorks' head of marketing Terry Press stated, "Steve Jobs should take a pill." Despite the successful box office performances of both films, tensions would remain high between Jobs and Katzenberg for many years. According to Jobs, Katzenberg came to Jobs after the success of Shrek (2001) and insisted he had never heard the pitch for A Bug's Life, reasoning that his settlement with Disney would have given him a share of the profits if that were so. Although the contention left all parties estranged, Pixar and PDI employees kept up the old friendships that had arisen from spending a long time together in computer animation.

== Music ==
The film's score was composed and conducted by Randy Newman. Walt Disney Records released the soundtrack on October 27, 1998. The album's first track is a song called "The Time of Your Life" written and performed by Newman, while all the other 19 tracks are orchestral cues. Although the album was out of print physically in the United States during the 2000s, in June 2018 Universal Music Japan announced that a re-mastered edition would be released on October 3, 2018, along with other soundtrack albums from the Walt Disney Records pre-2018 catalogue. The album is also available for purchase on iTunes. The time duration is 47 minutes and 32 seconds.

== Release ==
=== Marketing ===
The teaser trailers for both A Bug's Life and Mulan premiered in November 1997, attached to the theatrical release of Flubber and the re-release of The Little Mermaid. McDonald's served as a promotion partner, selling Happy Meal toys themed to the film.

=== Theatrical ===
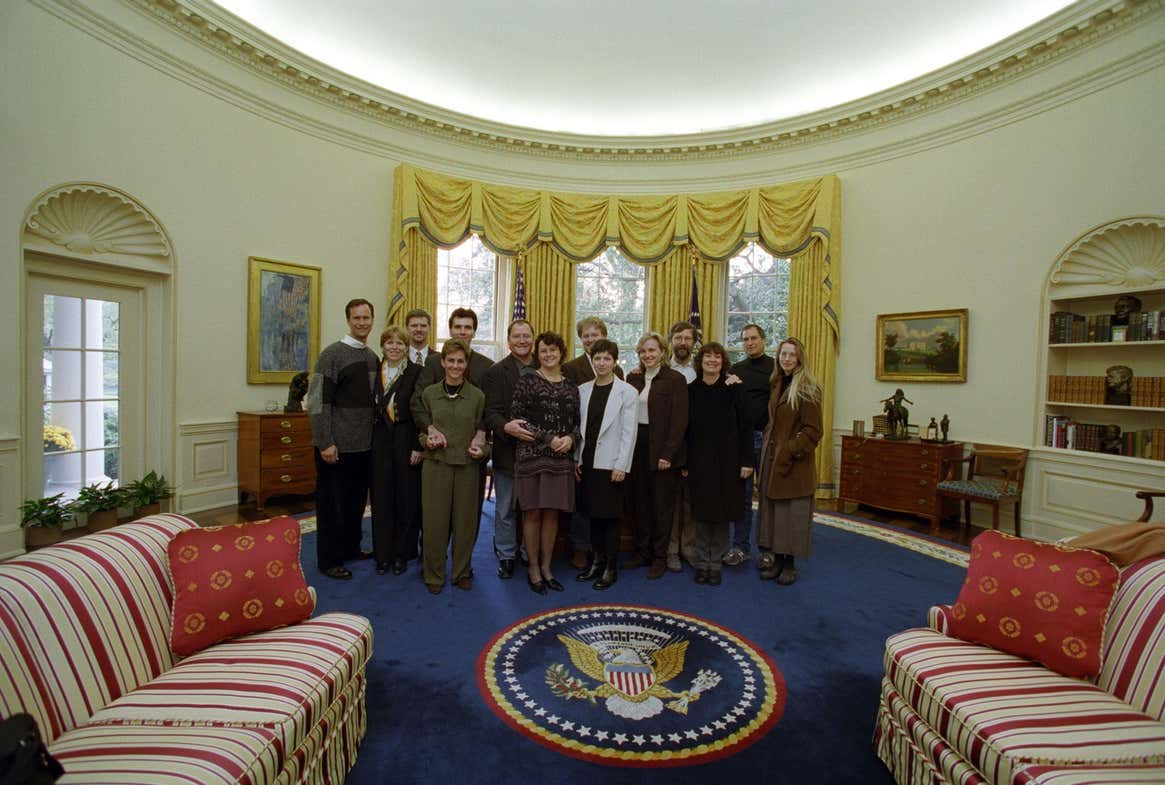
A Bug's Life crew in the Oval Office

A few days before the world premiere, the film was screened at Camp David as the movie theater in the White House was under renovation. A day after the screening, the crew visited the Oval Office in the White House.

The film's world premiere was on November 14, 1998, at the El Capitan Theatre in Los Angeles. It opened there on November 20, 1998 before its nationwide release alongside Babe: Pig in the City and Home Fries five days later on November 25.

A teaser trailer for Star Wars: Episode I – The Phantom Menace was attached to the screenings of A Bug's Life. As with other films such as Meet Joe Black, The Siege and The Waterboy, moviegoers bought tickets for the sole purpose of seeing the trailer and leaving before the film started. Within a few weeks into the film's theatrical release, new outtakes were added to the theatrical prints. Because the film is animated, no actual outtakes exist; they are animated specifically for the outtakes sequence.

=== Home media ===
A Bug's Life was the first home video release to be entirely created using a digital transfer. Every frame of animation was converted from the film's computer data, as opposed to the standard analog film-to-videotape transfer process. This allowed for the film's DVD release to retain its original 2.35:1 widescreen format. The DVD was released on April 20, 1999, alongside a VHS release which was presented in a standard 1.33:1 "fullscreen" format. The film's fullscreen transfer was performed by entirely "reframing" the film shot by shot; more than half of the film's footage was modified by Pixar animators to fit within the film's aspect ratio. Several characters and objects were moved closer together to avoid being cut out of frame. The film's VHS release was the best-selling VHS in the United Kingdom, with 1.76 million units sold by the end of the year. On August 1, 2000, these editions were re-released on VHS and DVD under the Walt Disney Gold Classic Collection banner.

On November 23, 1999, a 2-disc Collector's Edition DVD was released. The first disc has the option of viewing the film in widescreen or fullscreen, an audio commentary and two isolated audio tracks. On the second disc, the supplemental materials include behind-the-scenes footage, abandoned sequences, storyboards, trailers and more. A re-issue of the Collector's Edition DVD premiered four years later on May 27, 2003. This THX-certified DVD release includes newly added bonus features, such as a set-top game and a Finding Nemo featurette.

On May 19, 2009, the film was released on Blu-ray, and then on 4K Blu-ray on March 3, 2020.

== Reception ==
=== Box office ===
A Bug's Life grossed $371,940 at the El Capitan Theatre in its first five days before expanding nationwide. The film grossed a record $45.7 million during the five-day Thanksgiving holiday weekend, including $33.3 million for the three-day weekend, ranking first at the box office, beating out The Rugrats Movie, Babe: Pig in the City, Enemy of the State and The Waterboy. Its five-day Thanksgiving opening gross surpassed the previous record holder held by 101 Dalmatians. This record was surpassed by Toy Story 2 the following year. With a total gross of $12.5 million, A Bug's Life achieved the second-highest first two-day Thanksgiving gross, behind Back to the Future Part II. It managed to retain the top position in its second weekend, making $17.1 million and outgrossing Psycho. During its third weekend, the film's number one spot was taken by Star Trek: Insurrection, but it still overperformed Jack Frost while earning $11.1 million.

In its first international weekend, the film grossed $3.2 million from 5 countries, setting record openings for an animated film in Australia ($1.6 million) and Thailand ($400,000), with the latter surpassing Mulan. Furthermore, it made $2 million during its opening weekend in Mexico, which was the country's second-highest at the time, after Godzilla.

By late December 1998, A Bug's Life had earned over $100 million. Combined with Titanic, several in-year 1998 films such as Saving Private Ryan, Armageddon, Deep Impact, Godzilla, Mulan, There's Something About Mary, Rush Hour, Lethal Weapon 4, The Waterboy and Dr. Dolittle pulled $7 billion in North America altogether, propelling the film industry to a record year at the box office.

In February 1999, the film also had a record opening for an animated film in the United Kingdom with an opening weekend gross of £4.2 million ($6.9 million), surpassing Toy Story. Upon opening, it beat Shakespeare in Love and Stepmom to reach the number one spot. The film would remain so for five weeks until it was overtaken by Patch Adams in its sixth weekend. Earning a total of £23.9 million ($45 million) during its theatrical run, A Bug's Life was the country's third-highest-grossing film of 1999, only behind Star Wars: Episode I – The Phantom Menace and Notting Hill. It also made $556,000 in the Philippines, which was the country's second-highest for an animated film, behind The Lion King. In Japan, the film ended Armageddon's 13-week-long run in the number one spot, earning $1.7 million.

At the end of its theatrical run, the film grossed $162.8 million in the United States and Canada and $200.4 million in foreign countries, pushing its worldwide gross to $363.3 million, surpassing the competition from DreamWorks Animation's Antz, which earned $171.8 million worldwide.

=== Critical response ===
A Bug's Life was mostly well-received upon release. On review aggregator Rotten Tomatoes, the film has a rating of 92% based on 90 reviews and an average rating of 7.9/10. The site's critical consensus reads, "A Bug's Life is a rousing adventure that blends animated thrills with witty dialogue and memorable characters – and another smashing early success for Pixar." Another review aggregator, Metacritic, gave the film a score of 78 out of 100 based on 23 critics, indicating "generally favorable" reviews.

Todd McCarthy of Variety wrote, "Lasseter and Pixar broke new technical and aesthetic ground in the animation field with Toy Story, and here they surpass it in both scope and complexity of movement while telling a story that overlaps Antz in numerous ways." James Berardinelli of ReelViews gave the film three and a half stars out of four, saying "A Bug's Life, like Toy Story, develops protagonists we can root for, and places them in the midst of a fast-moving, energetic adventure." Roger Ebert of the Chicago Sun-Times gave the film three and a half stars out of four, writing "Will A Bug's Life suffer by coming out so soon after Antz? Not any more than one thriller hurts the chances for the next one. Antz may even help business for A Bug's Life by demonstrating how many dramatic and comedic possibilities can be found in an anthill." Kenneth Turan of the Los Angeles Times gave the film four out of five stars, writing "What A Bug's Life demonstrates is that when it comes to bugs, the most fun ones to hang out with hang exclusively with the gang at Pixar." Peter Stack of the San Francisco Chronicle gave the film four out of four stars, stating "A Bug's Life is one of the great movies – a triumph of storytelling and character development, and a whole new ballgame for computer animation. Pixar Animation Studios has raised the genre to an astonishing new level".

Richard Corliss of Time magazine wrote, "The plot matures handsomely; the characters neatly converge and combust; the gags pay off with emotional resonance." Owen Gleiberman of Entertainment Weekly gave the film a B, saying "A Bug's Life may be the single most amazing film I've ever seen that I couldn't fall in love with." Paul Clinton of CNN wrote, "A Bug's Life is a perfect movie for the holidays. It contains a great upbeat message ... it's wonderful to look at ... it's wildly inventive ... and it's entertaining for both adults and kids." Michael Wilmington of the Chicago Tribune gave the film three and a half stars out of four, and compared the movie to "Akira Kurosawa's Seven Samurai (with a little of another art-film legend, Federico Fellini, tossed in)," where "As in Samurai, the colony here is plagued every year by the arrival of bandits." On the contrary, Stephen Hunter of The Washington Post wrote, "Clever as it is, the film lacks charm. One problem: too many bugs. Second, bigger world for two purposes: to feed birds and to irk humans."

=== Accolades ===
A Bug's Life won a number of awards and numerous nominations. The film won the inaugural Broadcast Film Critics Association Award for Best Animated Film (tied with The Prince of Egypt) as well as the award for Best Family Film. It also won the Satellite Award for Best Animated Film and the Grammy Award for Best Instrumental Composition by Randy Newman. It was also nominated for the Academy Award for Best Original Musical or Comedy Score, the Golden Globe Award for Best Original Score and the BAFTA Award for Best Achievement in Special Visual Effects. In 2008, the American Film Institute nominated this film for its Top 10 Animation Films list.

=== Retrospective ===
In the years since its release, A Bug's Life has been regarded by critics and fans to be a Pixar film that, in contrast to its successors, has become largely forgotten by audiences. While recognized as solidifying Pixar's success, the film has been seen by some as the studio's sophomore slump in the wake of the critically acclaimed Toy Story, and inhibited by being released directly before the equally revered Toy Story 2. Pixar's feud with DreamWorks as a result of Antz has also been regarded as a factor in A Bug's Life's legacy.

Critics have generally ranked A Bug's Life to be one of Pixar's weaker releases. While it has been seen as "charming", as well as an "ambitious" film with pioneering animation for its time, others have described it as "adequate", and appealing more to a younger demographic. Nonetheless, the film's characters, voice acting, and humor have received lasting praise.

== Media and merchandise ==
=== Attached short film ===
The film's theatrical and video releases include Geri's Game, an Academy Award winning Pixar short made in 1997, a year before this film was released.

=== Video game ===
A game, based on the film, was developed by Traveller's Tales and Tiertex Design Studios and released by Sony Computer Entertainment, Disney Interactive, THQ and Activision for various systems. The game's storyline was similar to the film's, with a few changes. However, unlike the film, the game received mixed reviews. Aggregating review website GameRankings gave the Nintendo 64 version 54.40%, the PlayStation version 51.90% and the Game Boy Color version 36.63%. GameSpot gave the PlayStation version a 2.7/10, concluding that it was "obvious that Disney was more interested in producing a $40 advertisement for its movie than in developing a playable game." IGN gave the Nintendo 64 version a 6.8/10, praising the presentation and sound by stating "It was upbeat, cheery look and feel very much like the movie of the same name with cheery, happy tunes and strong sound effects" but again criticized the gameplay by saying the controls were "sluggish with stuttering framerate and tired gameplay mechanics", while they gave the PlayStation version a 4/10, criticizing the gameplay as slow and awkward but praising the presentation as cinematic.

==== Other game appearances ====
Flik and Hopper appear in the mobile game Disney Heroes: Battle Mode. Flik was added in Update 3.6. Hopper was added soon after.

In the city-building video game Disney Magic Kingdoms, Flik, Atta, Dot, Hopper and Heimlich were added as playable characters, along with the attractions It's Tough to Be a Bug! and Tuck and Roll's Drive 'Em Buggies, during a limited-time Event in 2024 with a storyline set sometime after Hopper was caught by the bird and before the Circus Bugs left Ant Island.

== Theme park attractions ==
The Disney California Adventure nighttime show World of Color features a segment that includes Heimlich the Caterpillar from the film.

=== Former theme park attractions ===
From 1998 to 2025, Disney's Animal Kingdom included the 3D show It's Tough to Be a Bug!, which featured Flik and Hopper from the film. The show also existed at Disney California Adventure from 2001 to 2018.

From 2002 to 2018, A Bug's Land was an area of Disney California Adventure that was inspired by the film.

== See also ==
- Lists of animated feature films
- List of Pixar films
- List of computer-animated films
- List of Disney animated films based on fairy tales
- List of films featuring insects

== Bibliography ==
- Price, David (2008). The Pixar Touch. New York: Alfred A. Knopf. ISBN 9780307265753.
