= Tarzan Rocks! =

Defunct live show at Disney's Animal Kingdom theme park in Orlando

Tarzan Rocks

Disney's Animal Kingdom
- Area: DinoLand U.S.A.
- Coordinates: 28.3571592°N 81.587295°W
- Status: Removed
- Opening date: July 9, 1999
- Closing date: January 21, 2006
- Replaced: Journey into Jungle Book
- Replaced by: Finding Nemo – The Musical

Ride statistics
- Attraction type: Musical show
- Model: Theater
- Theme: Tarzan
- Audience capacity: 1,500 per show
- Duration: 30 minutes
- Director: Reed Jones
- Producer: Angie Howard

Tarzan Rocks! was a live amusement show at Disney's Animal Kingdom at the Walt Disney World Resort in Florida. It is based on the 1999 animated film Tarzan, and utilizes the music written by Phil Collins. The show opened on July 9, 1999, and featured the use of acrobatics, a live band, costume characters, and cast members on rollerskates. After nearly a seven-year run, the show closed January 21, 2006.

== History ==
The stage musical Journey Into The Jungle Book, occupied the Theater in the Wild at DinoLand USA in Disney's Animal Kingdom in Orlando, Florida. It was themed to the 1967 animated film The Jungle Book. The show was an opening day attraction, and was received well. But Walt Disney Attractions, (now known as Disney Parks) was looking for a location for a new Tarzan stage show which could debut in the parks alongside the film's theatrical release. Journey Into The Jungle Book closed April 1999, and the Theater in the Wild began preparations for Tarzan. The new show, which was officially named Tarzan Rocks! was produced by Angie Howard, the resort's Entertainment Operations Manager. Howard brought in Reed Jones, to write and direct the new show. During previews, the make-up for Tarzan featured heavy eye liner to make his eyes appear, "...dark, deep set and mysterious..." according to his actor John Coulter. The eye liner wasn't used after the previews. The costumes were created by designer Cynthia Nordstrom, in her first stage show with the company.

When the show premiered in Disney's Animal Kingdom on July 9, 1999, it featured an ensemble of 27 people, with the titular character being played by Coulter, and Jane being played by Ramsi Nia Stoker. Howard stated that the show would be expected to run, "...for about three years."

Following the September 11, 2001 terrorist attacks in New York, tourism in the United States dropped dramatically. In response to the lower attendance, Tarzan Rocks! in addition to Festival of the Lion King, and a number of other shows reduced the amount of performances each day.

=== Closure ===
Rumors began circulating in late 2005 that the show would be closing, possibly due to the broadway show debuting in May 2006. It was speculated a Finding Nemo-related show would be replacing Tarzan Rocks. On a Disney World forum, January 11, 2006, an accident reportedly happened when aerial rigging snapped sending the Tarzan falling into the band. Another accident reportedly happened on January 16, 2006.

The show officially closed on Saturday, January 21, 2006. The Finding Nemo rumors were revealed to be factual in April 2006, when the Walt Disney Company confirmed Robert Lopez and his wife, Kristen Anderson-Lopez were hired to write Finding Nemo: The Musical.

== Musical Numbers ==
The music from the film, written by Phil Collins, was performed by a live band on stage.

1. "Two Worlds"
2. "You'll Be in My Heart"
3. "Son of Man"
4. "Strangers Like Me"
5. "Trashin' the Camp"
6. "You'll Be in My Heart/Finale"

== Reception ==
The show was fairly divisive. While people applauded the acrobatics, the utilization of rollerskates were highly criticized.

== Legacy ==
Following the successful debut of Tarzan Rocks, Disney had actor John Coulter film a television pilot for a live action Tarzan series. Produced under the working title Tarzan’s Animal Friends, the episode was filmed in the swamps of Florida, but was never picked up.

An attraction similar to Tarzan Rocks! named Tarzan: Call of the Jungle opened at Shanghai Disneyland in 2016.

== See also ==
- Voyage of the Little Mermaid
- Indiana Jones Epic Stunt Spectacular!
- Beauty and the Beast Live on Stage
