= Finding Nemo: The Big Blue... and Beyond! =

Live puppet and musical stage show at Disney's Animal Kingdom theme park

Finding Nemo The Big Blue... and Beyond!
- Musical logo

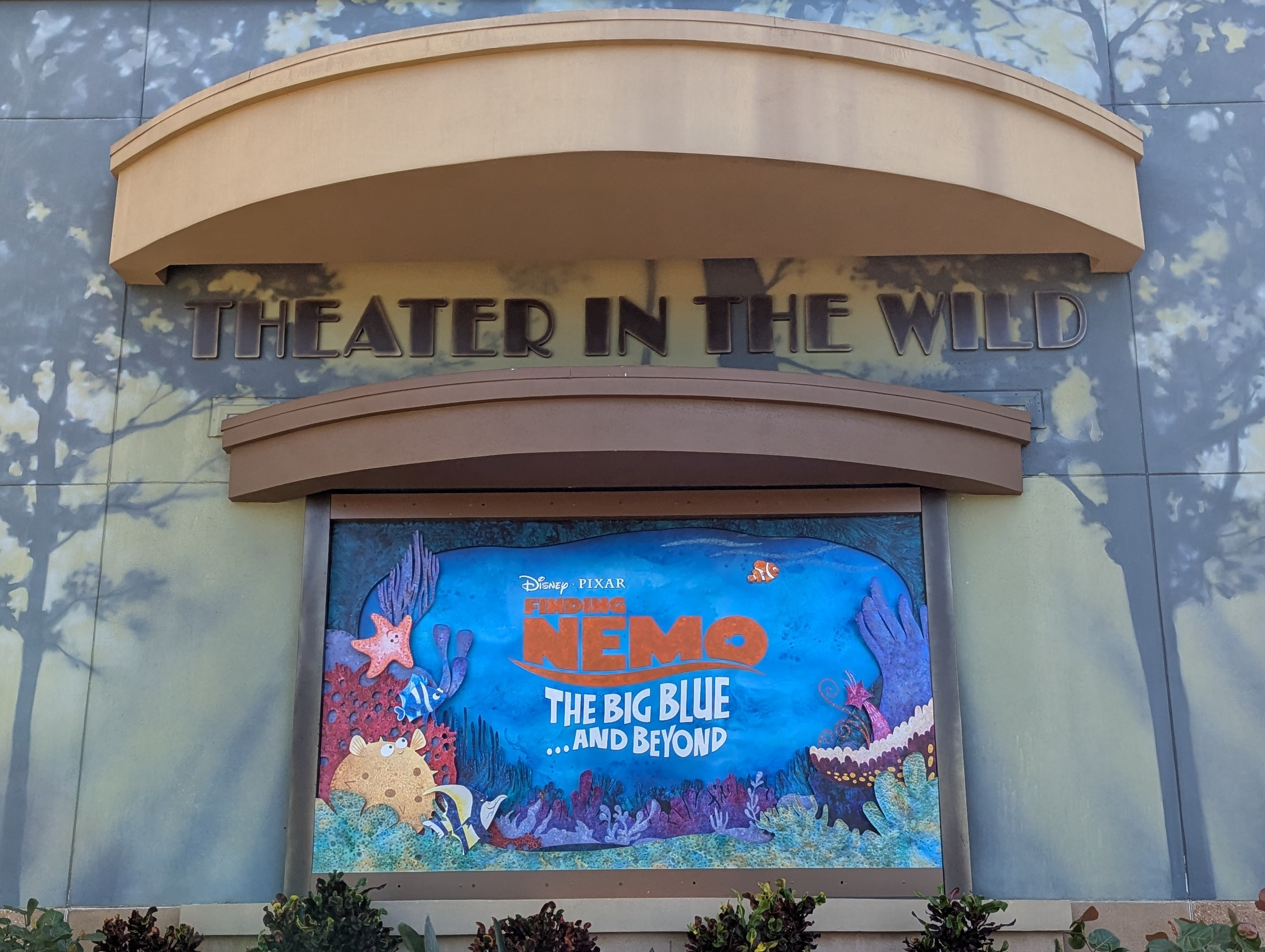
- The Theater in the Wild, home to Finding Nemo: The Big Blue... and Beyond!

Disney's Animal Kingdom
- Name: Finding Nemo – The Musical (2007–2020)
- Area: DinoLand U.S.A. (2007–2026); Asia (2026–present); Tropical Americas (future)
- Coordinates: 28.3571592°N 81.587295°W
- Status: Operating
- Soft opening date: November 5, 2006 (The Musical); June 11, 2022 (The Big Blue... and Beyond)
- Opening date: January 24, 2007 (The Musical); June 13, 2022 (The Big Blue... and Beyond)
- Closing date: March 15, 2020 (The Musical)
- Replaced: Tarzan Rocks! (DinoLand U.S.A.)

Ride statistics
- Attraction type: Musical show
- Model: Theater
- Theme: Finding Nemo
- Music: Music & lyrics by Kristen Anderson-Lopez and Robert Lopez
- Audience capacity: 1,500 per show
- Duration: 40 minutes (The Musical); 25 minutes (The Big Blue... and Beyond)
- Director: Peter Brosius
- Production Designer: Michael Curry
- Lightning Lane available
- Wheelchair accessible
- Assistive listening available
- Closed captioning available

Finding Nemo: The Big Blue... and Beyond! is a live puppet and musical stage show based on Disney/Pixar's 2003 animated film Finding Nemo, located at the Theater in the Wild at Disney's Animal Kingdom in Walt Disney World in Orlando, Florida. The original 40-minute show titled Finding Nemo – The Musical started holding previews on November 5, 2006, officially opening on January 24, 2007. The music is composed by Kristen Anderson-Lopez and Robert Lopez, who also composed the music for Frozen and Coco, using direct lines from the film.

On March 15, 2020, the original show had its final performance before the Walt Disney World Resort closed due to the COVID-19 outbreak's impact on Florida. A new reimagined and revamped version of the show entitled Finding Nemo: The Big Blue... and Beyond! premiered on June 13, 2022.

== History ==
The stage musicals Journey into the Jungle Book and Tarzan Rocks! occupied the Theater in the Wild at DinoLand USA in Disney's Animal Kingdom in Orlando, Florida from 1998 to 2006. These were themed to the animated films The Jungle Book and Tarzan. After the closure of Tarzan Rocks! in January 2006, rumors began spreading that it would be replaced by a musical adaptation of Finding Nemo. This was confirmed on April 7, 2006, when Disney announced that the musical adaptation of Finding Nemo, with new songs written by Tony Award-winning Avenue Q composer Robert Lopez and his wife, Kristen Anderson-Lopez, would "combine puppets, dancers, acrobats and animated backdrops" and open in late 2006. Years later, Anderson-Lopez explained that she had written a compact 15-minute a cappella version of the story of Oedipus; someone at Disney read it and recognized her talent for condensing material, and offered her the opportunity to make a pitch for the Finding Nemo project.

Tony Award-winning director Peter Brosius signed on to direct the show, with Michael Curry, who designed puppets for Disney's successful stage version of The Lion King, serving as leading puppet and production designer.

Anderson-Lopez said that the couple agreed to write the adaptation of "one of their favorite movies of all time" after considering "the idea of people coming in [to see the musical] at 4, 5 or 6 and saying, 'I want to do that'....So we want to take it as seriously as we would a Broadway show". To condense the feature-length film to 30 minutes, she and Lopez focused on a single theme from the movie, the idea that "the world's dangerous and beautiful".

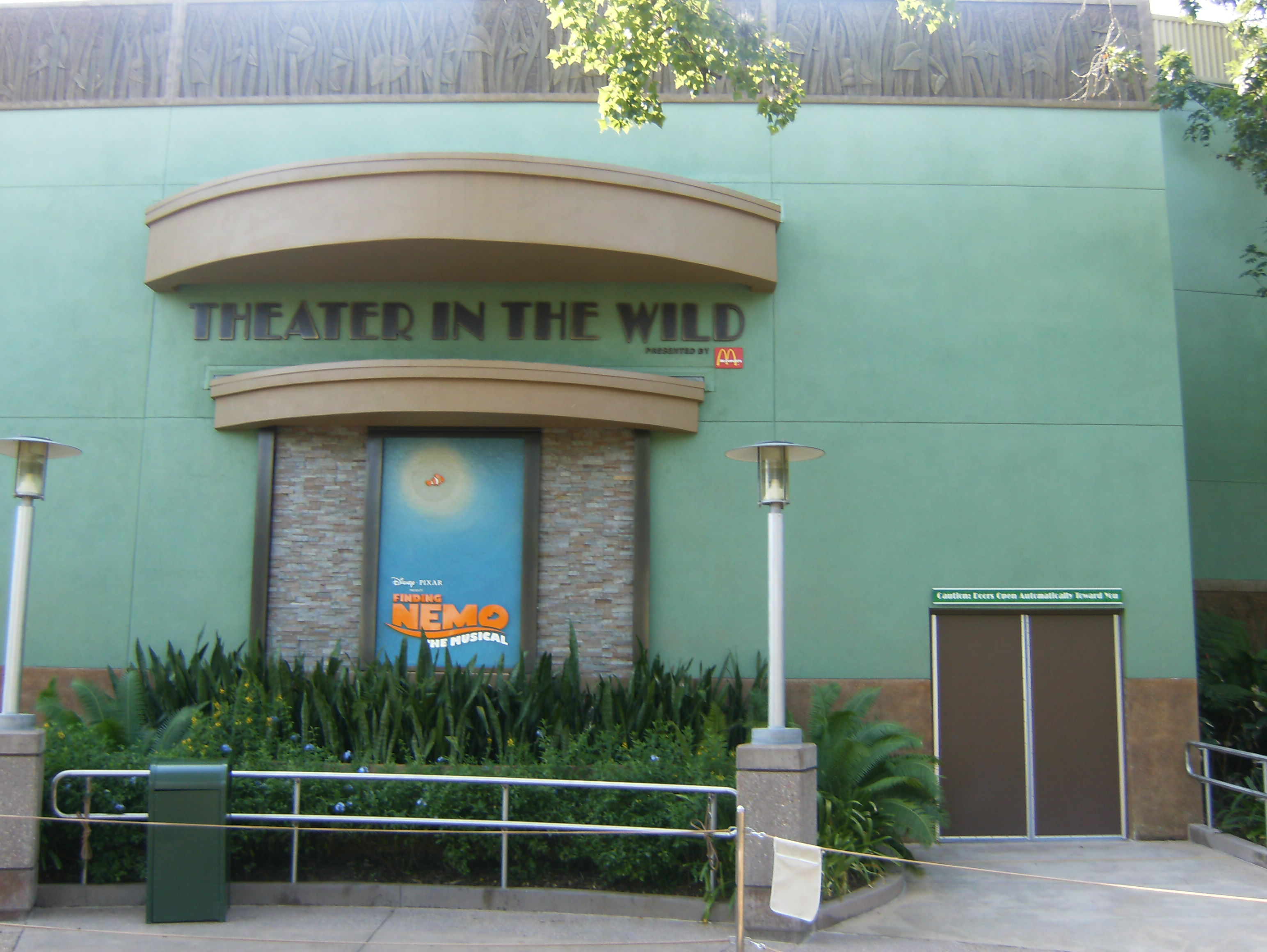
Finding Nemo – The Musical previously ran at the Theater in the Wild from 2007 to 2020.

The show started holding previews on November 5, 2006, officially opening on January 24, 2007. That same month, a New York studio recording of the show was released on iTunes, with Lopez and Anderson-Lopez providing the voices for Marlin and Dory, respectively. Avenue Q star Stephanie D'Abruzzo also appeared on the recording, as Sheldon/Deb. Finding Nemo was the first non-musical animated film to which Disney added songs to produce a stage musical. In 2009, Finding Nemo – The Musical was honored with a Thea Award for Best Live Show from the Themed Entertainment Association.

When Walt Disney World reopened in July 2020 following the COVID-19 pandemic, all stage shows remained closed due to a dispute between the Actors' Equity Association and Walt Disney World over allowing performers to wear face masks and providing regular testing.

On September 14, 2021, it was announced that a "reimagined" version of the show would open in 2022. However, on November 19, 2021, it was announced that the show would be replaced by a new show entitled Finding Nemo: The Big Blue... and Beyond!.

== Plot ==
The musical is based on the plot of the film Finding Nemo, with characters performed in large puppetry by live actors and dancers on stage. It revolves around Marlin, a widowed clownfish who is desperate to find his son Nemo, who was snatched away by a diver in the ocean. Along the way, Marlin meets Dory, a regal blue tang with short-term memory loss, who ends up accompanying him on his journey. Meanwhile, Nemo ends up in a fish aquarium at a dentist office in Sydney, Australia and meets Gill, a moorish idol living in the dentist's aquarium, and the leader of the Tank Gang, who also live in the aquarium.

In the revamped version, a framing device is added in which the Tank Gang narrate the story before being released from the Marine Life Institute. (Note: As depicted in Finding Dory.)

== Musical numbers ==
- "Prologue" - Marlin, Coral & Sea Chorus
- "Big Blue World (Part 1)" - Marlin & Nemo
- "Big Blue World (Part 2)" - Nemo, Marlin, Professor Ray, Pearl, Sheldon, Tad & Sea Chorus
- "The Drop-Off" - Professor Ray & Reef Kids
- "Abduction/Big Blue World (Reprise)" - Nemo, Marlin, Sheldon, Pearl & Tad
- "Dory's Ditty" - Dory & Marlin
- "Fish Are Friends Not Food" - Bruce, Chum, Anchor, Marlin, Dory & Sharks
- "Where's My Dad?" - Nemo
- "We Swim Together" - Gill, Gurgle, Peach, Bubbles, Bloat & Nemo
- "Just Keep Swimming (Part 1)" - Dory, Marlin & Sea Chorus
- "Just Keep Swimming (Part 2)" - Marlin, Dory, Moonfish & Jellyfish
- "Not My Dad" - Nemo
- "Go With The Flow" - Crush, Marlin, Dory, Breeze, Kai, Squirt & Sea Turtles
- "One Dedicated Father" - Sea Turtles
- "That's My Dad" - Nemo
- "We Swim Together (Reprise)" - Nemo, Gill, Gurgle, Peach, Bubbles & Bloat
- "Just Keep Swimming Together" - Nemo, Marlin, Dory & Moonfish
- "Finale (Part 1)" - Nemo & Marlin
- "Finale (Part 2)" - Nemo, Marlin, Dory, Professor Ray & Sea Chorus

== Soundtrack ==
All songs featured in the show were written by Kristen Anderson-Lopez and Robert Lopez. A soundtrack album was released a day prior to the original show's opening date in 2007, with Anderson-Lopez and Lopez providing the voices of Dory and Marlin, respectively.

=== Cast ===
- Kristen Anderson-Lopez as Dory
- Victor E. Chan as Crush
- Alison Cimmet as Coral/Peach
- Stephanie D'Abruzzo as Sheldon/Deb
- Jordan Gelber as Chum/Nigel
- Victor Hawks as Mr. Ray/Gill
- Robert Lopez as Marlin
- Karla Mosley as Tad/Squirt
- Graham Stevens as Bruce
- Kate Wetherhead as Nemo
- Michael-Leon Wooley as Bloat

Finding Nemo – The Musical

Soundtrack album
- Released: January 23, 2007
- Genre: Show tunes
- Length: 31:48
- Label: Walt Disney Records

No.	Title	Characters	Length
1.	"Prologue"	Marlin and Coral	1:30
2.	"In the Big Blue World"	Marlin, Nemo, Mr. Ray, Tad, Pearl, Sheldon, Reef Dads and Finding Nemo Ensemble	4:26
3.	"The Drop-off"	Marlin, Nemo, Tad, Pearl and Sheldon	1:01
4.	"Dory's Ditty"	Marlin and Dory	0:56
5.	"Sharks"	Marlin, Dory, Bruce, Anchor and Chum	0:45
6.	"Fish Are Friends, Not Food"	Marlin, Dory, Bruce, Anchor and Chum	2:49
7.	"Where's My Dad?"	Dentist and Nemo	0:45
8.	"The Tank Gang"	Nemo, Deb, Bloat, Bubbles, Peach, Gill, Nigel and Dentist	1:07
9.	"We Swim Together"	Nemo, Deb, Bloat, Bubbles, Peach, Gill and Nigel	1:58
10.	"Dory and Marlin"	Marlin and Dory	0:26
11.	"Just Keep Swimming"	Dory, Marlin and Moonfish	5:16
12.	"Not My Dad" (Reprise)	Nemo and Gill	0:52
13.	"Go With the Flow"	Marlin, Dory, Crush, Squirt and Finding Nemo Ensemble	3:38
14.	"Gossip"	Octopus Mom, Octopus Baby, Lobsters, Swordfish, Penguins and Nigel	0:54
15.	"That's My Dad" (Reprise)	Nemo and Nigel	0:39
16.	"Darla!"	Nemo, Deb, Bloat, Bubbles, Peach, Gill, Nigel, Dentist, Darla and Marlin	0:38
17.	"Sewage Treatment Plant"	Marlin, Dory and Nemo	0:42
18.	"We Swim Together" (Reprise)	Marlin, Nemo, Dory and the Finding Nemo Ensemble	1:11
19.	"Finale - In the Big Blue World" (Reprise)	Marlin, Nemo, Dory, Mr. Ray and Finding Nemo Ensemble	2:15
Total length:			31:48
