= The Jungle Book: Alive with Magic =

Former show at Disney's Animal Kingdom

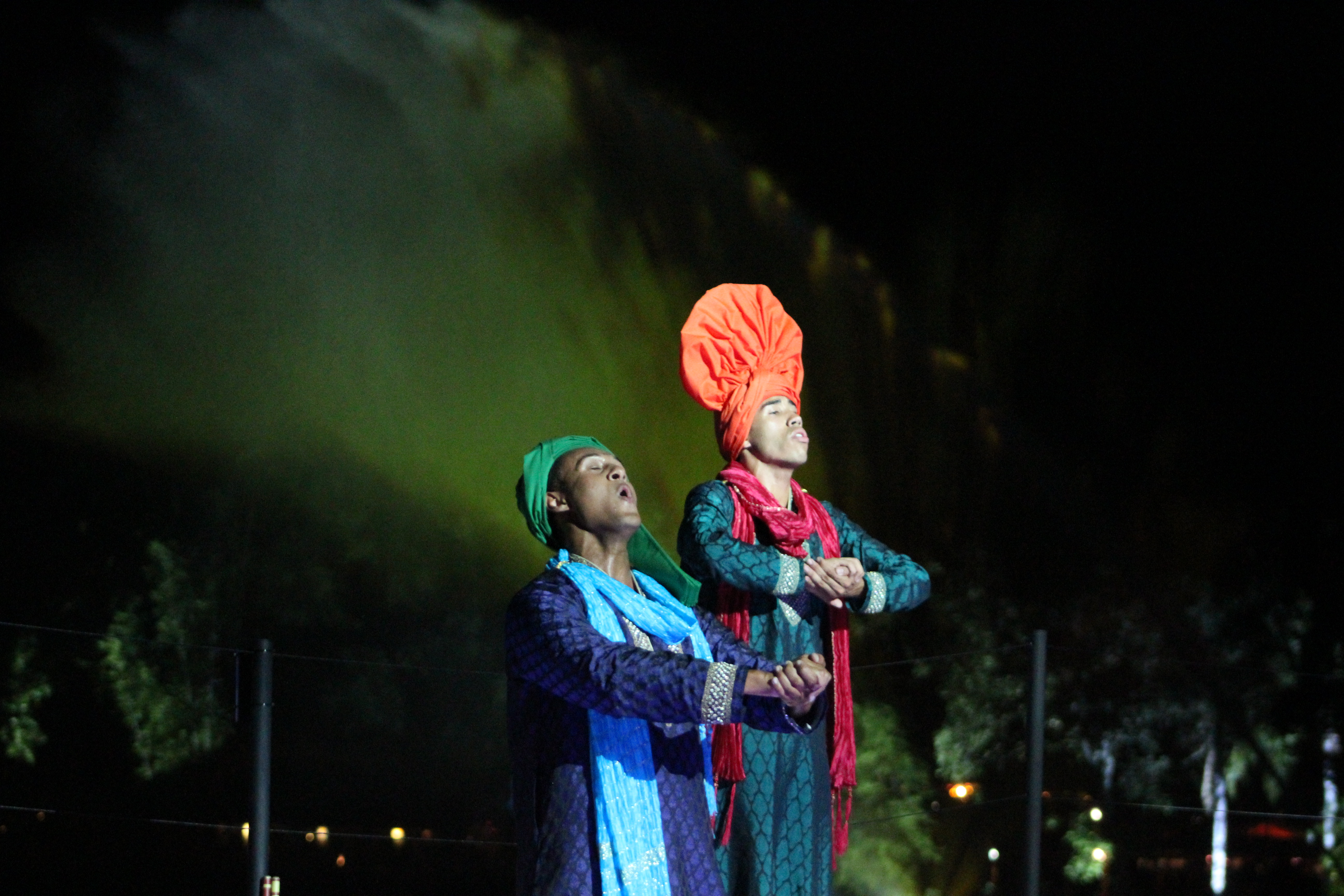

Disney's Animal Kingdom
- Area: Asia
- Status: Removed
- Soft opening date: May 27, 2016
- Opening date: May 28, 2016
- Closing date: September 5, 2016
- Replaced by: Rivers of Light

Ride statistics
- Attraction type: Show
- Designer: Walt Disney Creative Entertainment
- Theme: The Jungle Book
- Audience capacity: 5,000 per show
- Duration: 20 minutes
- Fastpass+ was available
- Wheelchair accessible

The Jungle Book: Alive with Magic was a short lived nighttime show at Disney's Animal Kingdom in the Walt Disney World Resort. The Jungle Book: Alive with Magic was located in the park's Discovery River. The show was limited-time engagement and filled the space of the delayed Rivers of Light night-time show, presumably until Rivers of Light was ready. The show featured music from the film, adding an Indian influence. The show opened on May 28, 2016, with a soft opening the night before.
