= Rivers of Light =

Former show at Disney's Animal Kingdom

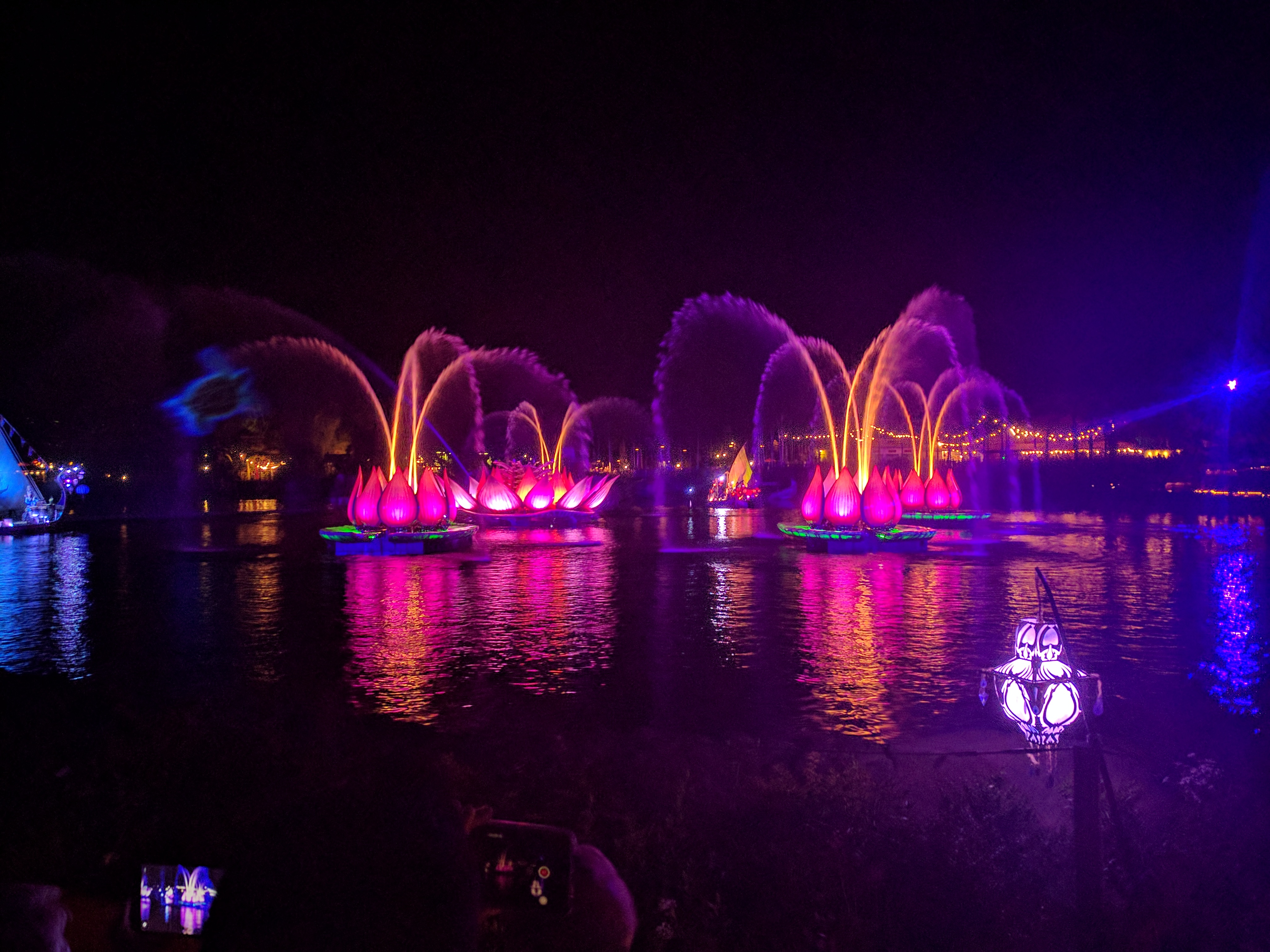

Disney's Animal Kingdom
- Name: Rivers of Light: We Are One (2019–2020)
- Area: Asia
- Status: Removed
- Soft opening date: February 10, 2017
- Opening date: February 17, 2017 (original); May 24, 2019 (We Are One)
- Closing date: May 23, 2019 (original); March 15, 2020 (We Are One)
- Replaced: The Jungle Book: Alive with Magic
- Replaced by: Disney KiteTails

Ride statistics
- Attraction type: Live hydrotechnic show
- Designer: Walt Disney Creative Entertainment
- Theme: Natural world
- Music: Don L. Harper, Mark Mancina, and Dave Metzger
- Audience capacity: 5,000 per show
- FastPass+ was available
- Wheelchair accessible

Rivers of Light was a nighttime show at Disney's Animal Kingdom in the Walt Disney World Resort. Located in the park's Discovery River lagoon between Discovery Island and Expedition Everest, the show featured water fountains, mist screens, floating lanterns, fire effects, lasers, lights, fog, projection mapping, and until September 2018, live performers. Lakeside seating areas were able to accommodate 5,000 guests.

Rivers of Light was initially developed as a nighttime parade by Steve Davison, but due to the need of infrastructural changes to Discovery Island to necessitate better viewing that would diminish the horticultural character of the area, this version of the project was cancelled in 2008. Following the debut of World of Color, the concept for Rivers of Light was revisited and took on the form of a nighttime lagoon show; it first announced in October 2013 as part of the park's expansion plans, which included Pandora–The World of Avatar and a nocturnal version of Kilimanjaro Safaris. Construction began in 2014. Walt Disney Imagineering and Walt Disney Creative Entertainment designed the show along with longtime collaborators Michael Curry, Don L. Harper and Mark Mancina.

The show was originally set to premiere on April 22, 2016, Earth Day and the park's 18th anniversary. However, on April 5, 2016, it was announced that the show had been delayed and would not be able to meet the April 22 premiere date. A portion of the show was previewed to media on April 19, 2016, when it was also announced that The Jungle Book: Alive with Magic, a limited-engagement show based on the 2016 live-action film, would fill the space of the delayed Rivers of Light night-time show. The show ran until September 5, 2016. On February 9, 2017, it was announced that Rivers of Light would open on February 17, 2017. The show began previews on February 10, 2017.

A retooled version of the show featuring animated characters, titled Rivers of Light: We Are One, debuted on Memorial Day Weekend 2019. The show was suspended in March 2020 owing to the COVID-19 pandemic and in July 2020, park officials confirmed rumors that the show would be retired.

== Show summary ==
=== Act I: Gifts of Light ===
Before the show begins, four lotus floats gradually drift onto the Discovery River Lagoon while fireflies awaken and the shadows of the four Animal Spirit Guides can be seen moving through the trees. The fireflies function as a visual element throughout the show, seemingly illuminating barges and occasionally accenting visual elements projected on water screens.

The show begins with the arrival of two teams of mystical storytellers on their respective lantern sailboats, playing a musical fanfare accompanied by the cries of animals. On the Asia side of the lagoon are Shaman Aditya (whose instrument is a horn) and Acolyte Ketu. On the Dinoland side of the lagoon are Shaman Aseema (whose instrument is a flute) and her Acolyte Ambu. These characters are silent and communicate only through pantomime, dance, shadow puppetry, and music; leaving a narrator to explain what we are about to see. These performers were removed on September 29, 2018, as the result of budget cuts.

Of all the gleaming planets in our vast universe, it is only here on Earth that water and light harmoniously unite to create the wonder of life. We most graciously welcome you to a timeless celebration of water and light with roots as far reaching as time itself. Here, where the forces of nature meet in harmony, the spirits of the animals are free to dance together in the night sky creating Rivers of Light. We are united in this special place to celebrate the magnificence and wonder of all living creatures, for in life we are all one.

=== Act II: Parade of the Animal Spirits ===
As the narration ends, the storytellers introduce us to the four Animal Spirit guides, each representing one of the four elements. Taking the form of large sculpted lantern barges, they consist of a Bengal Tiger (representing Fire), an African Bush Elephant and her calf (representing Earth), a Sea Turtle and its child (representing Water), and a Great Horned Owl with her owlets (representing Air). Moving across the lagoon and changing colour to the music, the Animal Spirits begin to leave their lanterns one by one and take to the sky in an astral form, bringing the lotuses to life and heralding the arrival of the Temple Lotus.

=== Act III: Dance of the Lotus ===
After the animal spirits have left their lanterns, the lotuses take center stage, flanking the central Temple Lotus barge. Aseema conducts the lotuses in their fountain ballet and has the shadow puppet-like figures of the turtle and owls dance amongst them on the water while the storytellers provide percussion.

=== Act IV: We Are One ===
After the Dance of the Lotus ends, Aditya plays his horn to call the Tiger spirit into action, who proceeds to leapfrog across the lotuses and begin a journey through the different realms of the Animal Spirits. Accompanied by the original song "We Are One" and utilizing footage taken from the Disneynature documentary series, we travel through the Tiger's South Asian jungles, the Sea Turtle's ocean, and the African savannah of the Elephant. The song is interrupted by a scene taken from African Cats, where an African lion chases after a mother cheetah on his territory, who manages to make a narrow escape and get her cubs to safety. Aseema and her boat reappear and she sends the Owl up from her boat to take us to the snowy regions of Alaska seen in Bears and the song resumes with a montage of animal families, ending on a flock of flamingos and the sounds of Aseema and Aditya's instruments as the two boats go back to center stage.

=== Act V: Rivers of Light ===
In a scene inspired visually and musically by the "Transformation" sequence in Brother Bear, the storytellers call upon the aurora borealis (the titular "Rivers of Light"), which starts to appear over the lagoon. Spirits of countless animals begin rushing and marching through the lights as the storytellers bask in the beautiful glow. The aurora fades on an image of a humpback whale breach and gives way to the night sky and animals in the constellations. As the Animal Spirit Guides return to their lantern barges, the narrator returns for concluding remarks.

Within each of us is a light. A light that shines in all living things. Here where fire and water bridge the earth and sky, our light rises on the wind to join the stars. As we journey on this great earth, may we remember the light we share? May we celebrate our bond with the natural world and the wonders that flow on Rivers of Light.

The Temple Lotus opens up to reveal a tower of fire that blasts to the beat of a grand finale reprise of We Are One. The animals return and the fireflies emerge from the Tree of Life in the form of spotlights.

== Music ==
The Music from Rivers of Light & Tree of Life Awakenings Shows at Disney’s Animal Kingdom Theme Park

Soundtrack album by Various Artists
- Released: June 2, 2017
- Studio: Abbey Road Studios; Capitol Studios (vocals)
- Length: 37:51
- Label: Walt Disney
- Producer: Matt Walker; Dan Stamper

=== Soundtrack ===
The music for River of Light was composed by Don Harper, Mark Mancina, and Dave Metzger, with lyrics by Miriam Stockley and Mancina. The entire soundtrack for the show, as well as that of Tree of Life: Awakenings, was released in a combined soundtrack album by Walt Disney Records on June 2, 2017.

==== Track listing ====
Rivers of Light (Tracks 1-7), Tree of Life Awakenings (Tracks 8-11)
No.	Title	Writer(s)	Length
1.	"The Awakening" (chants by Miriam Stockley)	Don Harper	2:06
2.	"Act 1: Prologue"	Mark Mancina, Dave Metzger	1:27
3.	"Act 2: Parade of the Animal Spirit Guides" (chants by Miriam Stockley)	Don Harper	2:42
4.	"Act 3: Dance of the Lotus"	Don Harper	2:32
5.	"Act 4: We Are One" (chants by Miriam Stockley)	Mark Mancina, Don Harper	4:31
6.	"Act 5: Rivers of Light" (chants by Miriam Stockley)	Mark Mancina, Don Harper, Dave Metzger	3:45
7.	"Afterglow" (chants by Miriam Stockley)	Mark Mancina	3:11
8.	"Rendezvous"	Andrew Lockington	4:09
9.	"Journey"	Andrew Lockington	3:53
10.	"Gift Giver"	Andrew Lockington	4:38
11.	"Disney Medley"	Andrew Lockington^{1}	4:57
Total length:			37:51

==== Notes ====
1. Includes "Steady as the Beating Drum" by Alan Menken and Stephen Schwartz, "Love Is a Song", "Little April Shower" by Frank Churchill and Larry Morey, "Epilogue" by James Newton Howard, "Two Worlds" by Phil Collins, "First Day", "Nemo Egg" by Thomas Newman, "Jake's First Flight" by James Horner, "I Wan'na Be Like You (The Monkey Song)" by Richard M. Sherman and Robert B. Sherman, "Circle of Life" by Elton John and Tim Rice.

== Show Barges ==
Rivers of Light consisted of 11 show barges that are all computer controlled. Each barge consists of 4 thrusters in a square configuration with the exception of the two lantern sailboat barges, which previously carried the show's live cast, two pairs of Shaman storytellers and their apprentices, representing different elements.

- Tiger
- Owl
- Turtle
- Elephant
- Lotus 1
- Lotus 2
- Lotus 3
- Lotus 4
- Temple Lotus
- Fire Lantern Sailboat (featuring Shaman Aditya and Acolyte Ketu)
- Water Lantern Sailboat (featuring Shaman Aseema and Acolyte Ambu)

== See also ==
- World of Color
- Fantasmic!
- Epcot Forever
- Luminous: The Symphony of Us
