= The Oasis Exhibits =

Exhibits at Disney's Animal Kingdom

Disney's Animal Kingdom
- Area: The Oasis
- Coordinates: 28°21′22″N 81°35′25″W
- Status: Operating
- Opening date: April 22, 1998

Ride statistics
- Attraction type: Exhibit/trail
- Designer: Walt Disney Imagineering
- Theme: Rainforest
- Wheelchair accessible

The Oasis Exhibits form the entrance corridor for Disney's Animal Kingdom, serving a similar purpose as Main Street, U.S.A. at the Magic Kingdom. The exhibits feature waterfalls, exotic plant life, and animals selected for their "gentle disposition." The Oasis was designed to put guests into contact with animals immediately upon entering the park.

Animals shown at the Oasis include giant anteaters, swamp wallabies, babirusa, scarlet macaws, Hyacinth Macaws, military macaws, white ibises, Indian spot-billed ducks, muntjac, African spoonbills, black swans, Bronze-winged Ducks, Medium Sulphur-crested Cockatoos, Nene, and rhinoceros iguanas.
