= Tree of Life (Disney) =

Sculpture at Disney's Animal Kingdom

Coordinates: 28.357928°N 81.590540°W

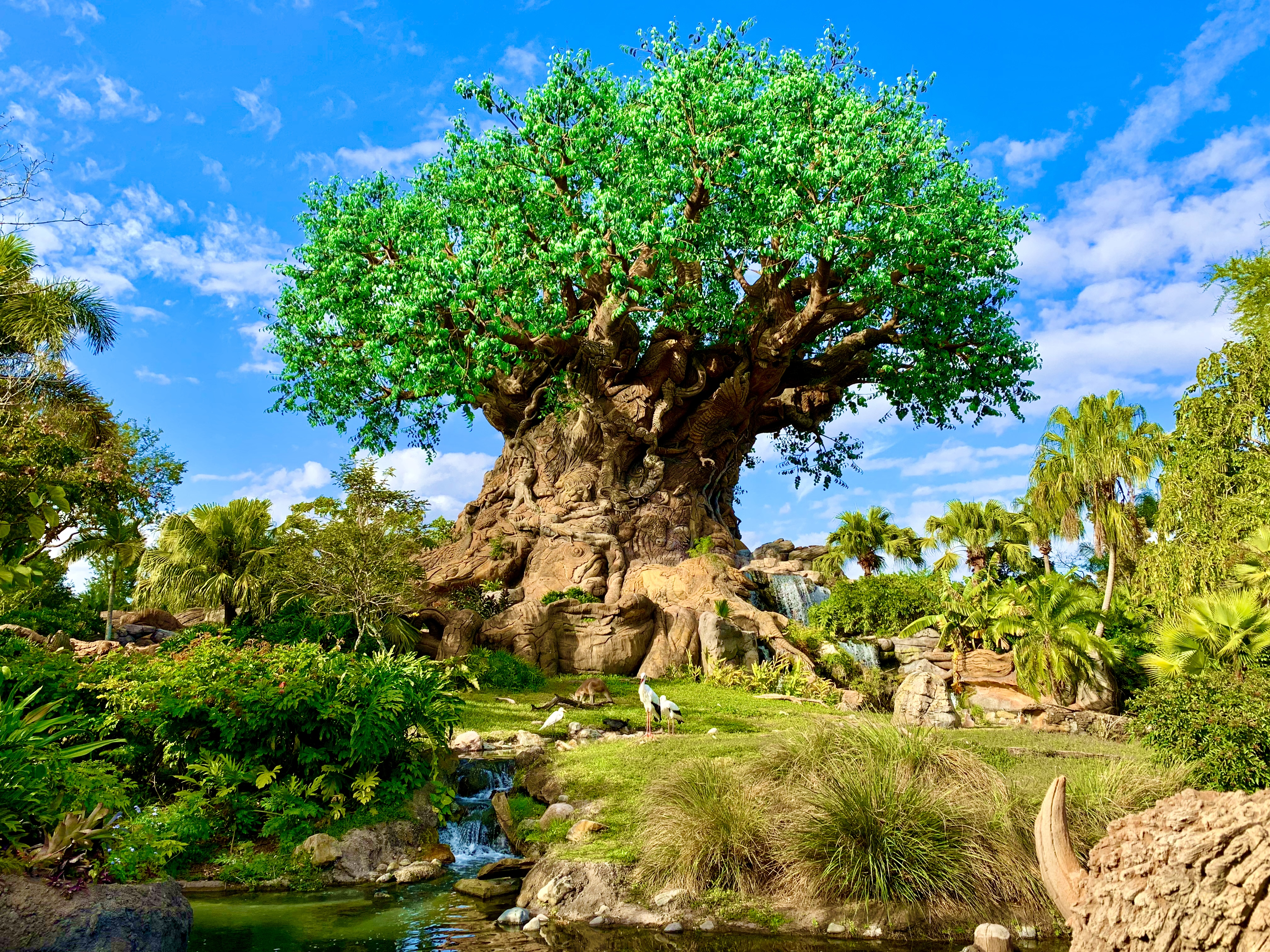

Disney's Animal Kingdom
- Area: Discovery Island
- Opening date: April 22, 1998

Ride statistics
- Designer: Walt Disney Imagineering
- Height: 145 ft (44.2 m)
- Base width: 50 ft (15.2 m)
- Wheelchair accessible

The Tree of Life is a 145-foot (44 m) sculpture of a baobab tree at Disney's Animal Kingdom, Walt Disney World Resort. With over 8,000 branches of very different sizes and about 102,000 artificial leaves, the sculpture debuted when the theme park opened on April 22, 1998. Inspired by the mythological concept of the same name, the Tree of Life features 337 carvings of existing and extinct animal species on its trunk and surrounding roots; after Jane Goodall's visit, her famous subject David Greybeard was carved into the tree. The sculpture took 18 months to create. Designed and fabricated at Brown & Root's Greens Bayou Fabrication Yard in Houston and based on the natural forms of baobab trees, the Tree of Life is located on Discovery Island, roughly in the center of the park. The tree features over 100,000 thermoplastic kynar leaves. At the structure's interior base the 428-seat Tree of Life Theater, which originally housed the 3D film It's Tough to Be a Bug! from the park's opening on April 22, 1998 until March 16, 2025; the theater now houses the 3D film Zootopia: Better Zoogether!, which opened on November 7, 2025. The tree also has a walking path, the Tree of Life Garden, that provides a closer look at the sculpture.

== Tree of Life Awakenings ==
The Tree of Life Awakenings is a series of projection mapping shows that debuted on May 27, 2016, as part of the park's new nighttime operating hours. A media preview of the show was presented on April 19, 2016. Four presentations are featured throughout the evening, which have been given names on the Rivers of Light soundtrack release:

- Journey: A playful deer and a watchful hawk.
- Rendezvous: A hummingbird and flowers.
- Gift Giver: A red fox in a winter setting.
- Disney Medley: Animal imagery inspired by Pocahontas, Bambi, Dinosaur, Tarzan, Finding Nemo, Avatar, The Jungle Book, and The Lion King.

Since then the park has added:

- First Snow (Holidays only, started 2019)
- Northern Lights (Holidays only, started 2019)
- A Lion King only projection (October 2021).
- Beacon of Magic (50th Anniversary nighttime transformation, October 2021 - April 2023)
- “Avatar-The Way of Water” feature. (2022)
- “Mufasa” feature (2024)

== Construction ==
The Tree of Life was under construction from 1997 through 1998 and took a total of 18 months to make with the help of three Disney Imagineers and ten artists. The tree is made of concrete. Soaring nearly fourteen stories tall (145 feet) and 165 feet wide, the Tree of Life is the tallest tree sculpture to exist.

Early concepts for the tree began with Dave Minichiello, Dan Goozee, Ben Tripp, Gerry Dunn, and Joe Rohde, all of whom were Disney Imagineers. Senior production designer Zsolt Hormay, Vinnie Byrne, Fabrice Kennel, Eric Kovach, Steve Humke, Joe Welborn, Gary Boundurant, Jacob Eaddy, Roger White, Parker Boyiddle, Craig Goseyun, and Arthur Rowlodge designed and sculpted the animals on the Tree of Life. During this process, primate researcher and park consultant Jane Goodall insisted that a chimpanzee be added to the list of animals being carved into the tree - specifically David Greybeard, one of the chimpanzees Goodall famously worked with. The sculptors were met with many challenges including the limited time available to carve and detail each animal due to the fast drying time of the cement. Before settling on a theatre-style show inside of the tree, designers considered having a restaurant at the bottom of the tree or access to the top of the tree for park guests to climb up.

== Hidden Mickey ==
A Hidden Mickey on the Tree of Life can be found facing upside-down right above the hippopotamus's eye.
