= Steve Davison =

Steve Davison is Lead Creative Executive of Parades and Spectaculars for Disney Live Entertainment, and is responsible for the overall creative direction of daytime parades, firework displays, and nighttime spectaculars at Walt Disney Parks and Resorts worldwide. He created such shows as Believe... There's Magic in the Stars, Wishes: A Magical Gathering of Disney Dreams, World of Color, and Disney Dreams!.

== Career at Disney ==
Davison began his career with Disney in 1981 as a model maker for the Disneyland Entertainment Art Department under the supervision of former art department head, Clare Graham. After several years serving as a model maker, art director, and senior art director for the department, he was promoted to show director in 1997, where he began to work on entertainment creative development. In the same year he spawned his first big creation, "It's a Small World Holiday," which brought Davison into the spotlight.

In 1999, Davison was approached to create a new fireworks show for the 45th Anniversary of Disneyland. Though having no prior experience with pyrotechnics, Davison created Believe... There's Magic in the Stars, the second fireworks show made for the park since Fantasy in the Sky debuted in 1958. The show launched his pyrotechnics career. Davison's next attraction conversion was Haunted Mansion Holiday. His idea of "when holidays collide" generated controversy from both Disney management and Haunted Mansion fans, delaying the project's approval by several years. But like It's a Small World Holiday, it quickly became popular among guests after debuting in 2001.

In 2003, Anne Hamburger, former executive vice president of Walt Disney Creative Entertainment, asked Davison to join Imagineering as creative director for parades and shows worldwide, leading to his promotion to vice president, parades and spectaculars, in 2006.

In 2015, Davison was announced at the unveiling of the Disneyland Resort Diamond Celebration under a new job title, lead creative executive of parades and spectaculars.

== Works ==
Productions which Davison was responsible for the creation of include:

=== Disneyland Resort ===
- World of Color (and related show additions such as, World of Color: Celebrate, World of Color: Winter Dreams, World of Color: Season of Light, and World of Color: Villainous)
- Disneyland Forever
- Mickey's Soundsational Parade
- Light Magic (Steve's first job for Art Director in 1997)
- Believe... There's Magic in the Stars
- Believe... In Holiday Magic
- Disney's Eureka! A California Parade
- Disney's LuminAria
- Fantasmic! (updated version which premiered in 2017)
- Haunted Mansion Holiday
- Remember... Dreams Come True
- Walt Disney's Parade of Dreams
- Block Party Bash
- Pixar Play Parade
- Magical: Disney's New Nighttime Spectacular of Magical Celebrations
- Halloween Screams
- Paint the Night Parade
- It's a Small World Holiday
- Mickey’s Mix Magic

=== Walt Disney World Resort ===
- Wishes: A Magical Gathering of Disney Dreams
- Block Party Bash
- Festival of Fantasy Parade
- Once Upon A Time
- Harmonious
- Luminous: The Symphony of Us

=== Tokyo Disney Resort ===
- Once Upon A Time
- The Legend of Mythica
- Jubilation!
- Fantasmic! (Tokyo DisneySea Version)
- Happiness is Here Parade
- Disney Gifts of Christmas
- Dreaming Up Parade
- Celebrate! Tokyo Disneyland
- Believe! Sea of Dreams

=== Disneyland Paris ===
- Wishes: A Magical Gathering of Disney Dreams
- Disney Dreams! (and related show additions such as, Disney Dreams of Christmas!)
- Disney Stars on Parade
- Disney Illuminations

=== Hong Kong Disneyland ===
- Paint the Night Parade
- Flights of Fantasy Parade
- Mickey's WaterWorks

=== Shanghai Disneyland ===
- Ignite the Dream: A Nighttime Spectacular of Magic and Light
- Mickey's Storybook Express
- Voyage to the Crystal Grotto
