= Disney Illuminations =

Former nighttime fireworks and projection show

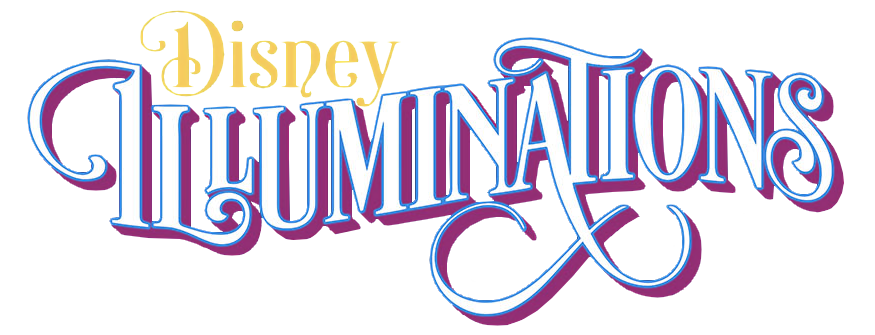

Disneyland Park (Paris)
- Status: Closed
- Soft opening date: 25 March 2017
- Opening date: 26 March 2017 (original); 31 May 2024 (updated)
- Closing date: 11 April 2023 (original); 6 January 2025 (updated)
- Replaced: Disney Dreams! (original)
- Replaced by: Disney Dreams! (revival); Disney Tales of Magic

Ride statistics
- Attraction type: Multimedia, water, pyrotechnic show
- Designer: Disney Live Entertainment
- Theme: Disney's animated and live-action films
- Music: Mark Hammond (Disney Illuminations); Rick McKee (Disney D-Light)
- Duration: 20 minutes (Original version); 30 minutes (Extended version, including drone pre and post-show); 15:50 minutes (2024 version)
- Host: Mickey Mouse
- Languages: English 50% French 50%
- Sponsor: PANDORA
- Wheelchair accessible

Disney Illuminations was a nighttime spectacular at Disneyland Park in Disneyland Paris. It opened on 26 March 2017 to celebrate the 25th anniversary of the park and replaced Disney Dreams!. Based on Ignite the Dream, the former nighttime spectacular at Shanghai Disneyland, the show featured projection mapping onto the park's castle, fireworks, water fountains, fire, music, lasers, searchlights, and other special effects.

On 8 May 2024, Disneyland Paris announced that the revamped version of Disney Illuminations will return on 31 May 2024.

== Plot summary ==
Within each of us is a dreamer, just waiting to be awakened. We all have the magic to unlock this inner child. But sometimes, that inner child needs an invitation to come out and play. This is your invitation... to dream.

The music played during this opening and the finale of the show is "A Dream Is a Wish Your Heart Makes" from Cinderella, and is performed by Heather Headley.

Like other Disney fireworks shows, various songs from Disney-related films are then showcased, including:

- Circle of Life and Can You Feel the Love Tonight from The Lion King
- Part of Your World from The Little Mermaid
- Fronds Like These and The Turtle Lope from Finding Nemo
- He's a Pirate from Pirates of the Caribbean
- Prologue (cut in 2024) and How Does a Moment Last Forever (cut in 2024) from Beauty and the Beast
- When You Wish Upon a Star from Pinocchio
- Main Title and March of the Resistance from Star Wars
- Let It Go, For the First Time in Forever (cut in 2024), and Vuelie from Frozen
- A Dream Is a Wish Your Heart Makes from Cinderella (reprise)
- If You Can Dream from Disney Princess

== Show history ==
The show soft-launched on 25 March 2017 at the start of the Disneyland Paris' 25th anniversary celebrations, with its official launch on 26 March 2017.

Illuminations was suspended from 12 March 2020 shortly prior to the park's closure during the COVID-19 pandemic in France; it appeared as a "Disneyland Paris Watch Party" on YouTube with a full video.

After a brief reopening from 21 December 2021 to 2 January 2022, it was suspended again due to French government regulations on large gatherings. The show reopened on 16 February and was paused on 11 November for the 2022–2023 Christmas season. A revival of Disney Dreams! of Christmas temporarily replaced the show from 12 November to 8 January 2023. Illuminations then returned on 9 January 2023.

On 10 January 2023, it was announced that its predecessor Disney Dreams! will be revived and replace Illuminations starting 12 April as part of the resort's 30th Anniversary "Grand Finale", which is part of the Disney 100 Years of Wonder celebration.

On 8 May 2024, it was announced that the revamped version of Disney Illuminations will return on 31 May 2024, after the final performance of Disney Dreams! on 30 May 2024, but the entire Beauty and the Beast live-action segment, as well as the second part of the Frozen segment (For the First Time in Forever part), were cut from the show. The show was reduced in runtime by a third due to the cuts made.

== Technology ==
The show is known to use a large amount of audio-visual, lighting, pyrotechnic and hydro-technic technology, mostly installed for the preceding Disney Dreams! show.

=== Projection ===
The castle is covered with projectors, and uses a much wider area than the previous Disney Dreams!, utilizing the hills around the castle as well as the castle itself.

=== Drones ===
In a Disney Parks first, choreographed lighted drone technology is used during a new, specially designed pre-show sequence for the park's 30th anniversary in 2022. Called "Disney D-Light", the new sequence uses 150 drones that recreated the Mickey Mouse-shaped 30th Anniversary logo above Le Château de la Belle au Bois Dormant. "Disney D-Light" is set to an original score and arrangement by Rick McKee that uses themes from Inside Out, Hercules, Moana, and other Disney films, as well as the anniversary's theme song "Un monde qui s'illumine" (written by Chantry Johnson, Noemie Legrand, and Tony Ferrari, and performed by Héloïse). The score was recorded at Abbey Road Studios by The London Symphony Orchestra.

The original version of the pre-show (and post-show called "Afterglow", now folded into the "Disney D-Light" pre-show) debuted ahead of the celebration's launch, on 5 March 2022. A second version of the pre-show continues to play before Disney Dreams! until 30 September 2023, the end of the 30th Anniversary celebrations, which is part of the Disney 100 Years of Wonder celebration.

From 31 May 2024, Disney Illuminations include the pre-show that continue to run even when the 2023 revival of Disney Dreams! had its final performance on 30 May. A new show called Disney Electrical Sky Parade, inspired by Disneyland Paris version of Main Street Electrical Parade, temporarily premiered on 8 January 2024, as part of Disney Symphony of Colours celebration and was initially a pre-show for Disney Dreams!. The show was expected to run until 30 September 2024, but was later extended to 6 January 2025.

However, on 5 December 2024, it was announced that a new pre-show titled Disney Love Notre-Dame de Paris, as a new limited time engagement in the honor of the grand opening of Notre Dame Cathedral, and inspired by Walt Disney Animation Studios' film, The Hunchback of Notre Dame, which was debuted from 5 to 14 December 2024 before Disney Illuminations at Disneyland Paris.

== See also ==
- World of Color
- Epcot Forever
- Luminous: The Symphony of Us
- Disney Movie Magic
- Wonderful World of Animation
- Happily Ever After
