= Star Wars: A Galactic Spectacular =

Fireworks and multimedia show

Star Wars: A Galactic Celebration
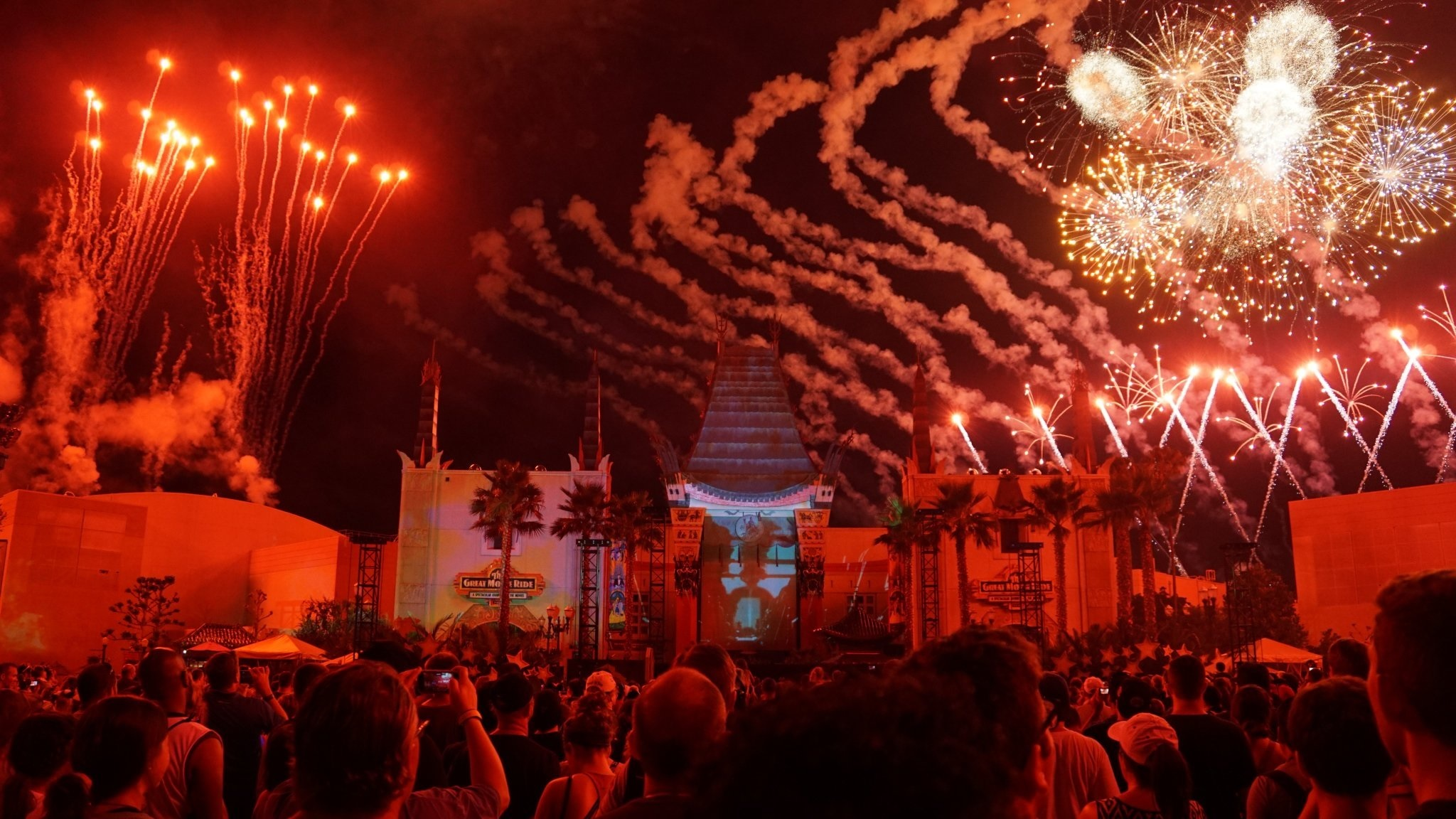

Disney's Hollywood Studios
- Area: Hollywood Boulevard
- Coordinates: 28.356232°N 81.560483°W
- Status: Closed
- Opening date: 2010 (as Symphony in the Stars); June 17, 2016 (as Star Wars: A Galactic Spectacular)
- Closing date: June 16, 2016 (as Symphony in the Stars); March 16, 2020 (as Star Wars: A Galactic Spectacular)
- Replaced by: Disney Movie Magic and Wonderful World of Animation

Disney Adventure World
- Area: World Premiere Plaza
- Coordinates: 48.8666589°N 2.7768075°E
- Status: Closed
- Opening date: January 14, 2017
- Closing date: March 15, 2020
- Replaced by: Magic Over Disney

Ride statistics
- Attraction type: Fireworks spectacular and multimedia show
- Designer: Walt Disney Creative Entertainment
- Theme: Star Wars
- Music: John Williams
- Duration: 13:55
- Narrator: Tom Kane
- Wheelchair accessible

Star Wars: A Galactic Spectacular (also known as Star Wars: A Galactic Celebration) was a nighttime show at Disney's Hollywood Studios in Walt Disney World. The show is based on the Star Wars film series and features fireworks, projection mapping, fire, lasers, fog effects, and searchlights. During the show, Star Wars imagery is projected onto the park's Chinese Theater facade and surrounding buildings around the park's hub on Hollywood Boulevard. The show had its celebrity-filled World Premiere on Friday, June 17, 2016, replacing the park's similarly-themed display, Symphony in the Stars: A Galactic Spectacular.

A second incarnation of the show debuted at Disney Adventure World in Disneyland Paris on January 14, 2017, where the imagery is projected onto The Twilight Zone Tower of Terror on Production Courtyard. It was shown seasonally during the "Season of the Force".

== Symphony in the Stars ==
A similar pyrotechnic show, Symphony in the Stars, held its original debut during the "Last Tour to Endor" event in 2010. This earlier generation of the show highlighted John Williams' musical score from the films, incorporating the music with archival voice and sound clippings from the films. An abridged version of the show was subsequently presented for special events including the "Star Tours Galactic Party" on May 19, 2011, and for Star Wars Day on May 4, 2013. The show began annually in 2014 during Star Wars Weekends. It was retooled as Symphony in the Stars: A Galactic Spectacular and became a nightly presentation beginning in December 2015 until its retirement in June 2016.

=== Soundtrack ===
- THX Deep Note/20th Century Fox fanfare^{†}
- "Main Theme/Rebel Blockade Runner" (from A New Hope)
- "The Imperial March" (from The Empire Strikes Back)
- "Binary Sunset" (from A New Hope)
- "Rey's Theme" (from The Force Awakens)^{‡}
- "Yoda's Theme" (from The Empire Strikes Back)
- "Duel of the Fates" (from The Phantom Menace)
- "Battle of the Heroes" (from Revenge of the Sith)^{†}
- "Clash of the Lightsabers" (from The Empire Strikes Back)^{†}
- "Emperor's Theme" (from Return of the Jedi)^{†}
- "TIE Fighter Attack/Battle of Yavin" (from A New Hope)^{†}
- "The Asteroid Field" (from The Empire Strikes Back)^{‡}
- "March of the Resistance" (from The Force Awakens)^{‡}
- "The Throne Room" (from A New Hope) and "Finale" (from The Empire Strikes Back)
- "Victory Celebration (from Return of the Jedi; played as exit music)^{†}

^{†} – Was cut in 2011. ^{‡} – Added in 2015.

== A Galactic Spectacular ==
The new generation of the show is the largest fireworks display in the park's history. The projection mapping technology—akin to that of Disneyland Forever, Once Upon a Time, Disney Dreams!, and Celebrate the Magic—projects images of scenes, characters, and locations from the Star Wars films.

A Galactic Spectacular features multiple special effects including fireworks, projection mapping, fire effects, lasers, searchlights, and theatrical smoke and fog effects. The main aerial pyrotechnic shells are launched off-center from behind the Chinese Theater; appearing to the right of the theater as opposed to directly behind it. This differs from previous fireworks shows, as the current aerial shells are launched from across World Drive, instead of within the park's boundary as previously done. Low-level pyrotechnics are launched from the rooftops of the former Great Movie Ride, Hyperion Theatre, ABC Commissary, Walt Disney Presents, Voyage of the Little Mermaid, and Disney Junior – Live on Stage! buildings. Two flamethrowers situated on both sides of the theater's central cupola release jets of isopar fire effects during the show. Fog machines hidden between the theater's spires create clouds of fog and smoke. Stage lighting surrounding the hub and concealed rope lights attached to the hub's trees provide additional lighting effects throughout the show. Imagery from all nine Star Wars saga films are projected onto the park's Chinese Theater facade. In addition to the Chinese Theater's surface, two blank projection facades flanking either side of the theater serve as additional areas of projection space.

The show's producers collaborated with composer John Williams and his music editor, Ramiro Belgardt, on adapting Williams' scores from the films into the show's soundtrack. Industrial Light & Magic created custom CGI sequences for the show.

=== Show summary ===
A Galactic Spectacular begins with a brief narrated prologue of the 1977 premiere of Star Wars at Grauman's Chinese Theater in Hollywood, California. The main show is divided into segments dedicated to battles, heroes, creatures, romance, and villains. The dramatic opening shot from A New Hope begins the sequence showing various battle scenes from Takodana, Hoth, Jakku, the Death Star, and Starkiller Base. The next segment, dedicated to the series' heroes, featuring Rey, Luke Skywalker, Han Solo, and ending with the Millennium Falcon escape scenes. Three brief segments follow then after; a cantina segment dedicated to the creatures and aliens from the series, a segment dedicated to the Force with Yoda and Obi-Wan Kenobi, and a romance segment with Han Solo, Leia Organa, Anakin Skywalker, and Padmé Amidala. A darker sequence is followed, recreating the fiery lightsaber battle between Anakin and Kenobi on Mustafar. The scene segues into a segment dedicated to the villains of the series, including Darth Vader, Darth Maul, Palpatine, Supreme Leader Snoke, and Kylo Ren. The trench run attacks on the Death Star and Starkiller Base are then played out as the finale sequence. The show concludes with a montage of all nine original Star Wars film poster art collaged across the Chinese Theater.

==== Soundtrack ====
- "Main Theme/Rebel Blockade Runner" (from A New Hope)
- "March On The Jedi Temple" (from Revenge of the Sith)
- "Attacking A star Destroyer" (from The Empire Strikes Back)
- "Anakin's Betrayal" (from Revenge of the Sith)
- "Anakin's Dark Deed's" (from Revenge of the Sith)
- "Rey's Theme" (from The Force Awakens)
- "Binary Sunset" (from A New Hope)
- "The Adventures of Han" (from Solo: A Star Wars Story)
- "The Asteroid Field" (from The Empire Strikes Back)
- "Cantina Band" (from A New Hope)
- "Yoda's Theme" (from The Empire Strikes Back)
- "Yoda And The Force" (from The Empire Strikes Back)
- "The Rebel Fleet/End Title" (from The Empire Strikes Back)
- "Anakin Vs. Obi-Wan" (from Revenge of the Sith)
- "The Imperial March" (from The Empire Strikes Back)
- "The Abduction" (from The Force Awakens)
- "Kylo Ren Arrives At The Battle" (from The Force Awakens)
- "March of the Resistance" (from The Force Awakens)
- "The Throne Room/End Title" (from A New Hope)
- "Finale" (from The Empire Strikes Back)

=== Gallery ===
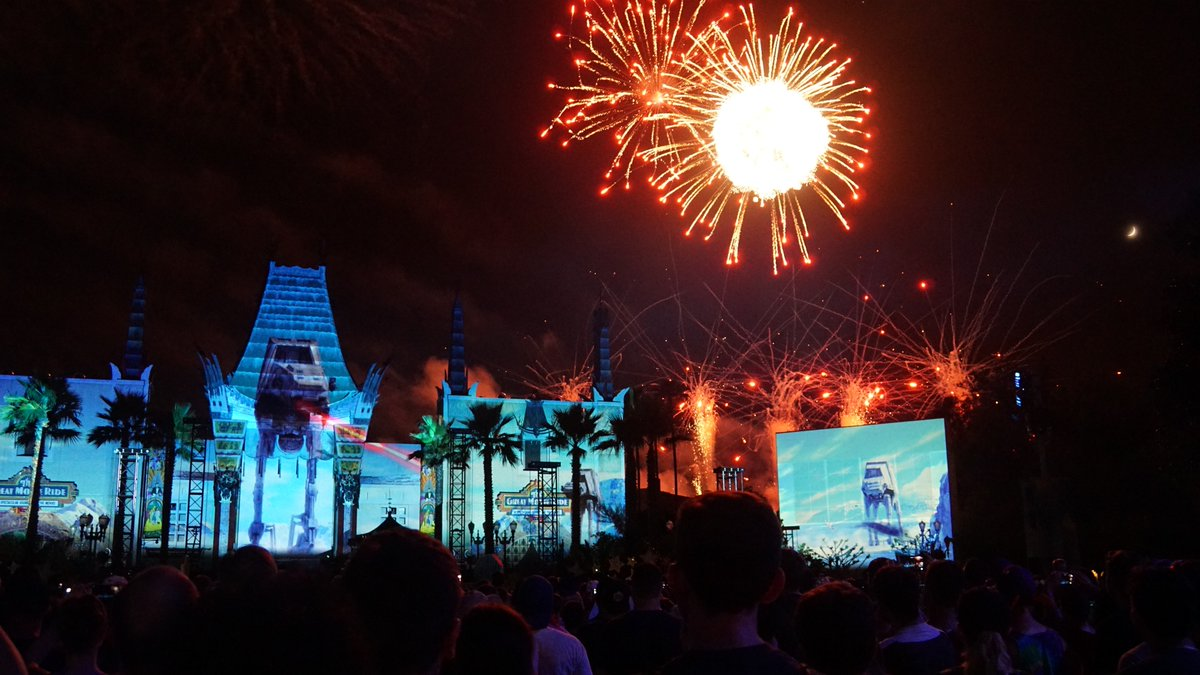
An AT-AT battle sequence showcasing the conjunction between projection mapping and pyrotechnics

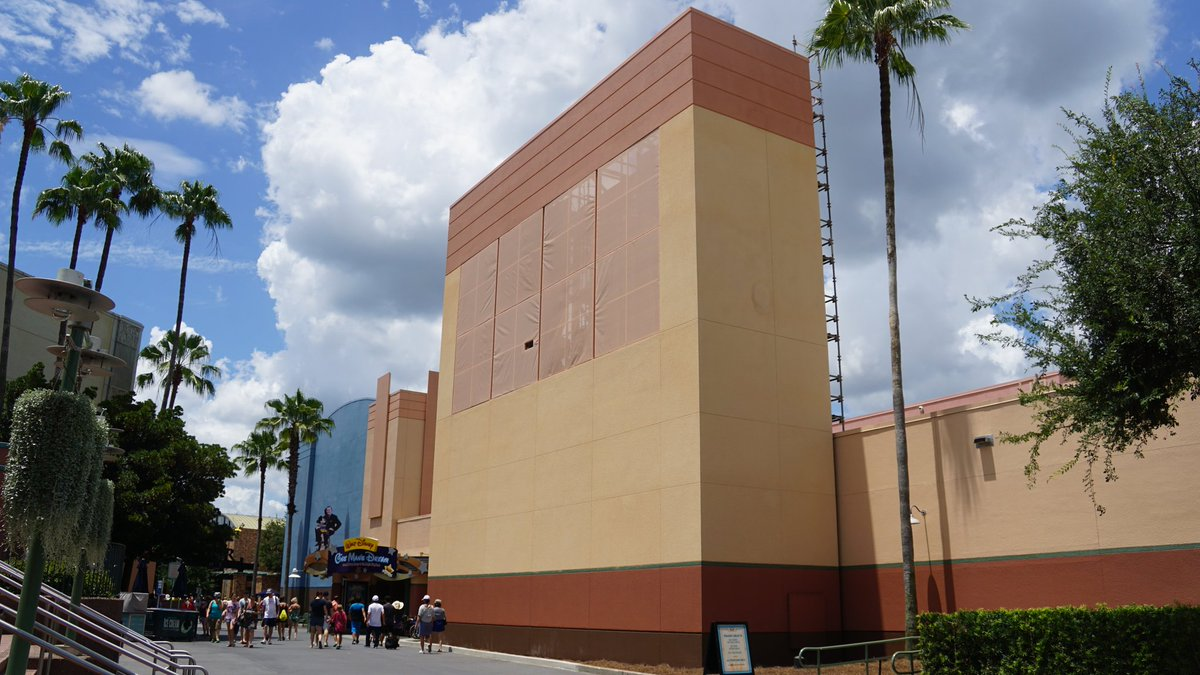
One of the hub's facade towers that doubly conceals the 7.1 surround sound audio speakers and acts as a projection surface during the show

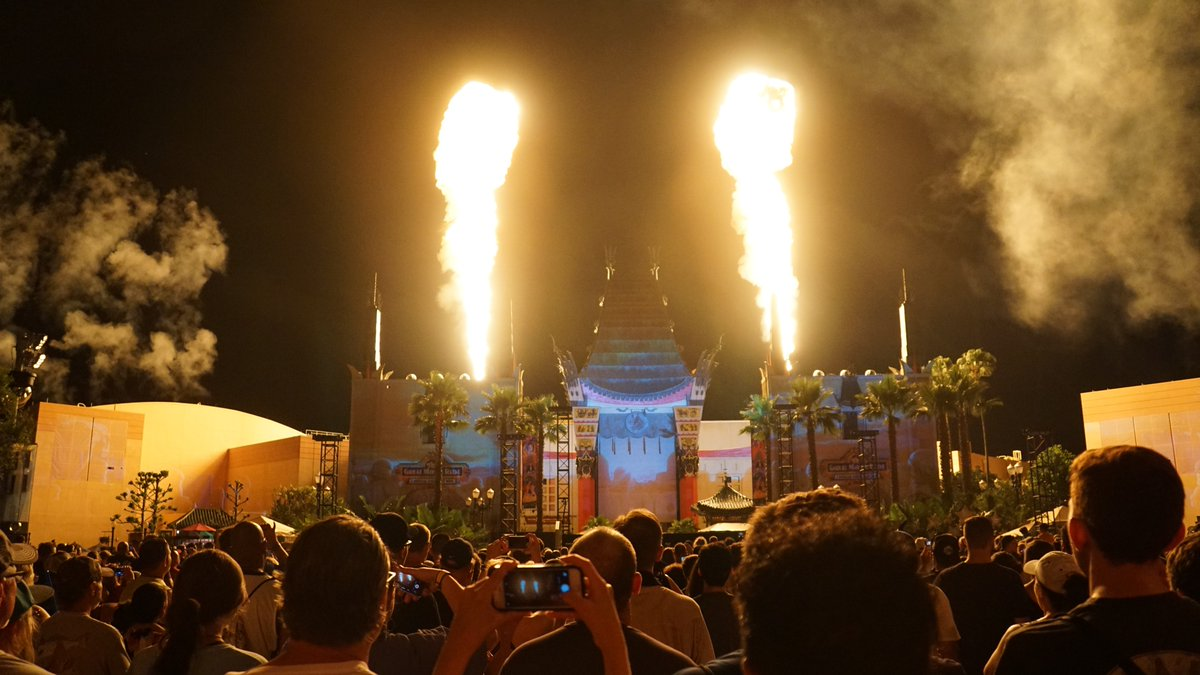
Two flamethrowers periodically create 150-foot tall jets of fire.
