= Stars on Parade =

Stars on Parade may refer to:

- Stars on Parade (1936 film), a British musical film directed by Oswald Mitchell
- Stars on Parade (1944 film), an American musical film directed by Lew Landers
- Stars on Parade (TV series), an American TV series (1953–54)
- "Stars on Parade", a song by Daniel Johnston on his album Don't Be Scared
- Stars on Parade (Disneyland Paris Parade)
