= Jubilation =

Jubilation may refer to:

- Jubilation!, a parade at Tokyo Disneyland
- Jubilation (The Band album), 1998
- Jubilation (Randy Johnston album), 1994
- Jubilation (The Rowans album), 1977
- Jubilation, a musical composition by Richard Edward Wilson
- "Jubilation" (song), a 1972 song by Paul Anka

== See also ==
- Jubilation Lee or Jubilee, a character in the Marvel Comics universe
- Jubilation T. Cornpone, a character in the comic strip Li'l Abner
- Celebration (disambiguation)
- Happiness (disambiguation)
- Jubilee (disambiguation)
