= Ignite the Dream: A Nighttime Spectacular of Magic and Light =

Nighttime show at Shanghai Disneyland

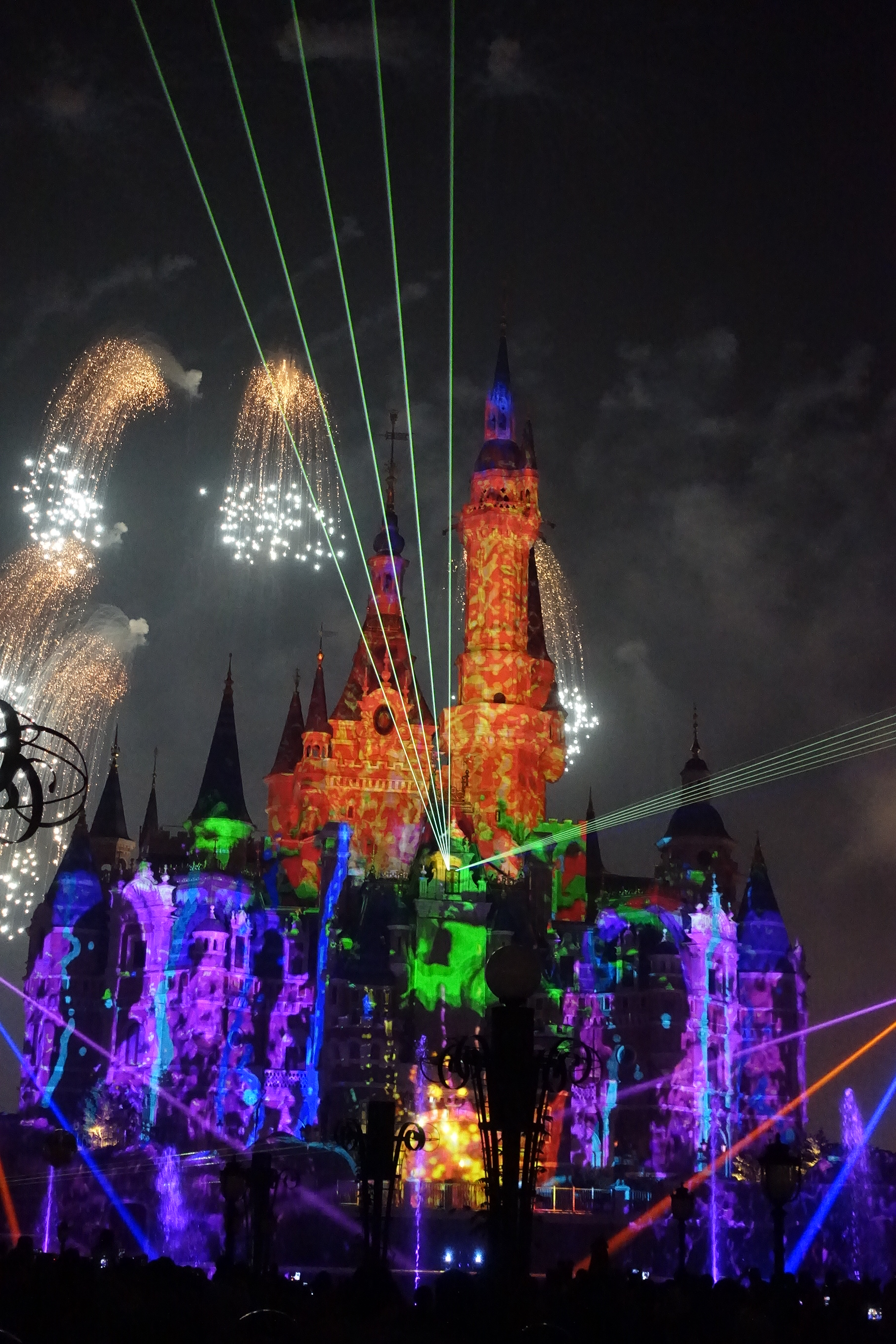

Shanghai Disneyland Park
- Name: Ignite the Dream: A Nighttime Spectacular of Magic and Light 点亮奇梦：夜光幻影秀
- Status: Closed
- Soft opening date: May 13, 2016
- Opening date: June 16, 2016
- Closing date: April 7, 2021
- Replaced by: Illuminate! A Nighttime Celebration

Ride statistics
- Attraction type: Multimedia, water, and pyrotechnic show
- Designer: Walt Disney Creative Entertainment
- Duration: 20 minutes
- Host: Mickey Mouse
- Languages: Mandarin Chinese; English
- Sponsor: China Pacific Insurance
- Wheelchair accessible

Ignite the Dream: A Nighttime Spectacular of Magic and Light was a nighttime spectacular at Shanghai Disneyland Park in the Shanghai Disney Resort. Ignite the Dream unfolds in the park's castle, Enchanted Storybook Castle, similar to other hybrid-nighttime castle shows found at other Disney parks, including: Disney Illuminations at Disneyland Paris for the 25th Anniversary edition. The show features fireworks, water fountains, fire, lasers, projection mapping, and searchlights. The show's story is centered on Mickey Mouse flying through the evening sky after discovering a magical spark that ignites his imagination.

On July 17, 2020, Shanghai Disneyland reopened after being temporarily closed due to the COVID-19 outbreak's impact on China, but the Star Wars and half of the Frozen segments, as well as several other segments, were cut from the show.

== Lighting ==
“Ignite the Dream” features multiple lighting fixtures located around the park. There are 6 spotlights with the ability to move and 8 Followspot lights located a distance behind the castle, near the “Voyage to the Crystal Grotto” ride. There are also 2 other lighting towers located in front of the castle, each on flanking a side of the stage also located there. Other than spotlights, the show also includes the use of 3 lasers, one located in the castle, and two others located on each lighting tower. Lastly, the show also has an estimated 7 projectors, 6 located around the castle, and one located behind the castle stage, projecting onto the water screen.

== Hydrotechnics ==
“Ignite the Dream” includes the use of several water features, including water screens and fountains. There are 38 fixed water jets, 7 moving water jets, and one water screen. All of the water features use recycled water from the castle moat.

== Pyrotechnics ==
“Ignite the Dream” features utilises fireworks and flame projectors during the show, housed across multiple launch sites. There are a total of 4 launch sites:

- One located above the show building housing the “Pinocchio Village Kitchen”, “Fairy Godmother’s Cupboard”, and “Mickey & Minnie’s Mercantile.

- One located in front of the “Alice in Wonderland Maze”.

- One located at the back of the park, split into 13 smaller sites, near North Shendi Road.

- Several smaller sites located on the roofs of the “Enchanted Storybook Castle”

The launch sites across the “Enchanted Storybook Castle”, “Alice in Wonderland Maze”, and fantasyland buildings also housed flame projectors which were added a year into the show’s run.

== Changes ==
“Ignite the Dream” has featured several changes to its lighting and pyrotechnics over the years due to different issues.

2015-2016(original planned show): Two fireworks launch sites were used during testing for the large shell fireworks, but were ultimately unused due to problems regarding air pollution. These firework sites, along with 11 other launch sites would only be used for event-exclusive firework shows.

2016 opening day: To celebrate the park’s opening, the show’s run was extended to include an exclusive finale featuring large shell fireworks not present in the main show.

2017: Technical issues with the laser effects on the “Enchanted Storybook Castle” resulted in them not being present from most shows. Flame projectors were also incorporated into the show segments of “Pirates of the Caribbean”, “Aladdin”, “Star Wars” and finale.

2018 (Mid-year): To address the critical levels of air pollution in Shanghai that year, several fireworks were temporarily reduced. Notably, the “fan” fireworks were reduced from 10 shells to 5. The laser effects of the “Enchanted Storybook Castle” were also fixed.

2019: The launch sites at the back of the park were temporarily put out of use, causing the large shell fireworks to be cut. This launch site would be put into use once again for its successor, “Illuminate”.

== Show summary ==
Mickey Mouse unleashed a spark of imagination, allowing him to journey across several Disney films. Mickey is transported to three scenes from The Lion King. Mickey splashes down a waterfall that transports him underwater and into the sea, where he encounters Ariel from The Little Mermaid. The scenery transitions into the Great Barrier Reef from Finding Nemo, where Mickey is swept up into the waves of the East Australian Current. The waves lead him to a sunken pirate ship, where Mickey opens a treasure chest and uncovers a cursed Aztec coin. The disembodied voice from Pirates of the Caribbean is heard and a battle siege led by Jack Sparrow unfolds. Mickey is then taken to the Cave of Wonders from Aladdin, where he upons the Genie, who performs "Friend Like Me". The sequence is followed by a montage of Mulan. The balloons from Up appear across the castle, carrying Mickey high above into the stars as the Millennium Falcon flies across the castle and enters a frenetic space battle from Star Wars. Following that, the show depicts a climactic scene from Frozen with Elsa and Anna. The show then concludes with a finale featuring a montage of scenes from the previously represented Disney films as well as Beauty and the Beast, Sleeping Beauty, Snow White and the Seven Dwarfs, The Princess and the Frog, Cars, Toy Story, Zootopia, Monsters Inc., Tangled, and Big Hero 6.

=== Soundtrack ===
- A Dream Is a Wish Your Heart Makes (from Cinderella) (Mack David / Al Hoffman / Jerry Livingston)
- Circle of Life, I Just Can't Wait to Be King (cut in 2020), Hakuna Matata (cut in 2020) (from The Lion King) (Elton John / Tim Rice)
- Part of Your World (from The Little Mermaid) (Alan Menken / Howard Ashman)
- Fronds Like These, The Turtle Lope (from Finding Nemo) (Thomas Newman)
- He's a Pirate (from Pirates of the Caribbean) (Klaus Badelt / Hans Zimmer)
- Friend Like Me (from Aladdin) (Alan Menken / Howard Ashman)
- Reflection, I'll Make a Man Out of You (from Mulan) (Matthew Wilder / David Zippel)
- When You Wish Upon A Star (cut in 2020) (from Pinocchio) (Leigh Harline / Ned Washington)
- Main Title (cut in 2020), March of the Resistance (cut in 2020) (from Star Wars / Star Wars: The Force Awakens) (John Williams)
- Let it Go, For the First Time in Forever (cut in 2020), Vuelie (cut in 2020) (from Frozen) (Robert Lopez / Kristen-Anderson Lopez)
- Transformation (from Beauty and the Beast) (Alan Menken)
- A Dream Is a Wish Your Heart Makes (from Cinderella) (Mack David / Al Hoffman / Jerry Livingston)

== See also ==
- Happily Ever After
