= Disney Stars and Motor Cars Parade =

Theme park parade, 2001–2008

Disney Stars and Motor Cars

Disney's Hollywood Studios
- Status: Removed
- Soft opening date: September 2001
- Opening date: October 1, 2001
- Closing date: March 8, 2008
- Replaced: Mulan Parade
- Replaced by: Block Party Bash

Walt Disney Studios Park
- Name: Disney Stars 'n' Cars
- Status: Removed
- Soft opening date: March 2009
- Opening date: April 4, 2009
- Closing date: July 3, 2014
- Replaced: High School Musical: The Party Show

Ride statistics
- Attraction type: Parade
- Duration: 25 minutes

Disney Stars and Motor Cars Parade was a parade at Disney's Hollywood Studios at Walt Disney World Resort, and Walt Disney Studios Park at Disneyland Paris. The parade first premiered on October 1, 2001, as part of the Walt Disney World Resort's 100 Years of Magic Celebration. The parade is a procession of characters riding in highly themed cars down the streets of Disney's Hollywood Studios in true Hollywood style.

During the holiday season, the parade was transformed into the "Hollywood Holly-day Parade". The parade had its final run at Disney's Hollywood Studios on March 8, 2008. It has been replaced by the Block Party Bash parade from Disney California Adventure Park. Block Party Bash had its "soft opening" on March 9, 2008. The parade then moved to its sister park, the Walt Disney Studios Park at Disneyland Paris in 2009, and was renamed Disney Stars 'n' Cars. It premiered on April 4, with previews for guests beginning on March 9.

== Disney-MGM Studios/Disney's Hollywood Studios ==
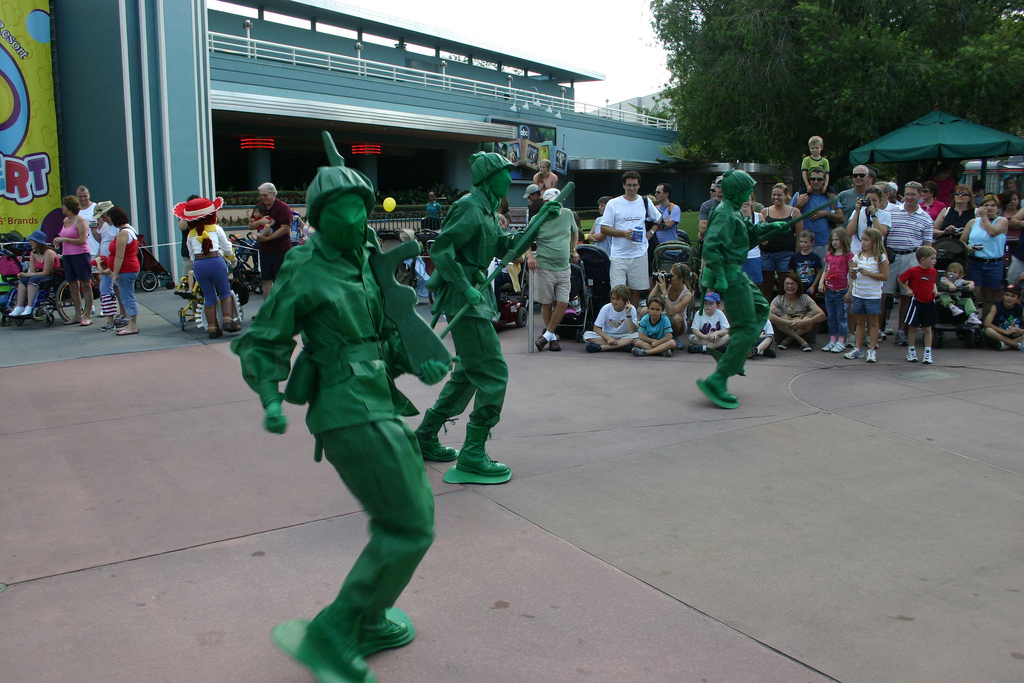
Toy Soldiers from Toy Story

=== Regular cars ===
The regular features of the parade included the following cars. The parade route travelled from the gate next to Star Tours over to Hollywood Boulevard to next to the exit of the park. The parade originally consisted of 15 cars, but was later updated to 18 over time:

- Float 1: Toy Story - Jessie, Sheriff Woody, Buzz, Bo Peep and the Toy Soldiers
- Float 2: Mary Poppins - Mary Poppins, Bert and Penguins
- Float 3: The Muppets - Kermit the Frog, Miss Piggy and Sweetums
- Float 4: Star Wars - R2-D2, Princess Leia, Luke Skywalker and Darth Vader
- Float 5: Mulan - Mulan, Mushu and Chinese Warriors
- Float 6: Aladdin - Aladdin, Jasmine and Harem Girls
- Float 7: Hercules - Hercules, Megara, Philoctetes, Pain and Panic
- Float 8: Disney Villains - Hades, Cruella De Vil, Jafar, Evil Queen, Captain Hook and Frollo
- Float 9: Atlantis: The Lost Empire - Milo Thatch, Kida, Vincenzo Santorini and Gaetan Moliére.
- Float 10: The Little Mermaid - Ariel and Fishes
- Float 11: Playhouse Disney - JoJo, Goliath the Lion, Bear, Treelo, Stanley, Peanut & Jelly Otter, Olie Polie and Zowie Polie
- Float 12: Snow White and the Seven Dwarfs - Snow White
- Float 13: The Grand Marshal - Chicken Little - Chicken Little / Ratatouille - Rémy / Enchanted - Giselle
- Float 14: Finale - Mickey Mouse, Minnie Mouse, Donald Duck, Goofy, Pluto and guest characters like Alice, Pinocchio, Gepetto, White Rabbit, Chip 'n' Dale and others

=== Updated cars ===
- Float: Monsters, Inc. - Sulley and Mike (Update: 2002)
- Float: Lilo & Stitch - Lilo and Stitch (Update: 2002)
- Float: Power Rangers - Consisting of Time Force, Wild Force, Ninja Storm, Dino Thunder, Space Patrol Delta, Mystic Force and Operation Overdrive Power Rangers (Update: 2005)
- Float: Cars - Lightning McQueen and Mater (Update: 2006)

=== Pre-Parade Cars ===
With the release of new films, both in theaters and home video, the parade has had several pre-parade promotional units that have not been permanent additions. Those "Guest stars" include: Enchanted, Ratatouille and Chicken Little.

=== Former cars ===
The vehicles and floats themed to Atlantis: The Lost Empire and Hercules were removed during the parade's time at Disney's Hollywood Studios.

== Walt Disney Studios Park ==
This parade replaced the Disney Cinema Parade and High School Musical: The Party Show at Walt Disney Studios Park. This version of the parade was also 25 minutes long, with a show-stop on stage at "Place des Stars."

=== Regular cars ===
The following eleven cars were at the Walt Disney Studios Park parade from the premiere on April 4, 2009. The parade route began and ended at the backstage gate next to Animagique. The parade had an update on April 2, 2010, with the twelve floats. By 2012, the show's stop at "Place des Stars" had been cut, with the floats simply driving through the studios as a normal parade.

=== 2014 version ===
- Float 1: Stars 'n' Cars - Mickey and Minnie
- Float 2: The Little Mermaid - Ariel
- Float 3: Aladdin - Aladdin and Jasmine
- Float 4: Mulan - Mulan and Mushu
- Float 5: Mary Poppins - Mary Poppins and Bert
- Float 6: Lilo & Stitch - Lilo and Stitch
- Float 7: Toy Story - Woody and Jessie
- Float 8: Ratatouille - Rémy and Emile
- Float 9: Disney Villains - Cruella, Gaston and Evil Queen
- Float 10: Stars 'n' Cars - Donald and Daisy

=== Former Cars ===
- Snow White and the Seven Dwarfs (2009-2014)
- Monsters, Inc. (2009-2013)
