= Pixar Play Parade =

Former parade at Disney theme parks

Disney California Adventure
- Status: Removed
- Opening date: March 14, 2008; June 15, 2012
- Closing date: January 4, 2011; August 20, 2017
- Replaced: Block Party Bash
- Replaced by: Better Together: A Pixar Pals Celebration!

Disney's Hollywood Studios
- Name: Pixar Pals: Countdown To Fun!
- Status: Removed
- Opening date: January 16, 2011
- Closing date: April 6, 2013
- Replaced: Block Party Bash
- Replaced by: Frozen Royal Welcome Ceremony

Disneyland
- Status: Removed
- Soft opening date: April 12, 2018
- Opening date: April 13, 2018
- Closing date: November 4, 2018
- Replaced: Mickey's Soundsational Parade
- Replaced by: Mickey's Soundsational Parade

Ride statistics
- Attraction type: Parade
- Designer: Walt Disney Creative Entertainment
- Theme: Pixar

Pixar Play Parade was a parade at the Disneyland Resort. The parade featured floats and characters based on Disney·Pixar films such as Monsters, Inc., The Incredibles and Toy Story. In a first for Disney California Adventure, the floats also featured small water jets that shot water into the crowd of spectators (this parade effect was first introduced in 1993 for "Aladdin's Royal Caravan" at Disneyland). The music used in the parade was derived from Hong Kong Disneyland's Mickey's WaterWorks Parade, both having the same tunes with changes in lyrics.

== History ==
Due to the large construction phase in the park, the parade went on hiatus starting on January 4, 2011. It was originally set to return in November, however it did not as construction was still ongoing. During the hiatus, it was replaced by "Pixar Pals", an interactive show that only featured characters from Monsters, Inc. and The Incredibles. Pixar Pals concluded in May 2012 and Pixar Play Parade returned on June 15, 2012, to coincide with the grand reopening of Disney California Adventure. During the 2016 Disney California Adventure Food & Wine Festival, the parade was put on hiatus and Pixar Pals temporarily returned to the park with "The Incredibles", but "The Monsters Inc" float did not return this time. The parade later returned when the Food and Wine Festival ended.

In January 2011, a similar parade called Pixar Pals: Countdown To Fun! debuted at Disney's Hollywood Studios. This parade reused floats from Block Party Bash and used the same theme tune. The former Army Men floats were turned into single character floats. This parade was not received very well and was retired in April 2013, leaving Disney's Hollywood Studios without a main daytime parade outside of the Frozen Royal Welcome Ceremony which appeared throughout the summers of 2014 and 2015.

On July 15, 2017, at D23 Expo, it was officially announced that the Pixar Play Parade would be moving from Disney California Adventure to Disneyland Park as part of the "Pixar Fest" event. On December 5, 2017, new floats for Luxo Jr., Inside Out, and Up were revealed for the parade, and later seen when the parade began its official run on April 13, 2018.

On December 4, 2023, Disney California Adventure announced that a new Daytime parade, Better Together: A Pixar Pals Celebration, would premiere on April 26, 2024, and take place until August 4, 2024 before the Halloween season, as part of the Pixar Fest celebration. On December 5, 2024, it was announced that the Daytime parade will return on May 16, 2025, as part of Disneyland Resort's 70th anniversary celebration.

== Parade units ==
=== Pixar Play Parade ===
- Luxo Jr. Unit (2018): The parade begins with the Luxo Jr lamp, and the Pixar Ball rolling in front of it. The unit contains various songs from Pixar films like You've Got a Friend in Me from Toy Story, the theme to The Incredibles, and If I Didn't Have You from Monsters Inc.
- Monsters University Unit: A group of Monsters University cheerleaders and students lead off the parade with a baton-twirling bandleader Roz and a large drum-shaped float driven by James P. Sullivan. An animated figure of Mike Wazowski sits on the back of the float, with few members of the CDA walking behind. The unit was originally set to a cover version of "Bang the Drum All Day", originally performed by Todd Rundgren, but was replaced by the Monsters University fight song.
- The Incredibles Unit: The Incredibles float features a large replica of Syndrome's Omnidroid with two arms moving around the float with the help of two performers, spouting water occasionally. Jack-Jack Parr rides on one of the arms of the droid, occasionally shooting flames from his head. On the other arm of the Omnidroid is Violet in a force field. Mr. Incredible, Elastigirl, and Frozone ride in front of the float on individual hovercraft-styled vehicles, along with dancers on spring-loaded stilts. The unit is set to a cover version of "Don't Stop Me Now", originally performed by Queen.
- Ratatouille Unit (2008-2010): Chefs on stilts walk in front of the large food-themed float. Remy stands on the front of the float in front of Chef Gusteau's cookbook, while rats on the other sections of the float hang from spaghetti, including Remy's brother Emile in a ladle. This unit did not usually run regularly. This unit was set to a cover version of "Yummy Yummy Yummy", originally performed by Ohio Express. This unit has been removed due to the installation of the Red Car Trolley Electric cables, as the unit was too tall for the trolley's cables.
- Inside Out Unit (2018): Perched atop colorful memory orbs, Joy and Sadness take flight aboard the Rocket Wagon, with Bing Bong cheering them on.
- Finding Nemo Unit: Puppets of Marlin, Nemo, Dory, and Squirt lead this section of the parade, with oversized pieces of coral and a large puppet of Crush on the float along with water-squirting baby turtles. Female performers with large jellyfish puppets follow the float. The unit is set to a cover of the pop standard, "Sea Cruise".
- A Bug's Life Unit: The longest float in the parade, it features Flik and Atta on a two-person swing with Dot looking on, along with two larger swings in the back portion of the float capable of swinging almost 360-degrees around the top of the float. Heimlich leads the float, pushing a water-squirting flower with him, occasionally splitting into multiple portions as he walks. Slim takes up the rear of the float dancing and playing with a smaller female bug and waving to guests. The unit is set to "Bugs Just Want to Have Fun", in the melody of "Girls Just Want to Have Fun", originally performed by Cyndi Lauper.
- Up Unit (2018): Russell appears alongside Kevin, with Carl Fredricksen and Dug following behind amid green foliage and snipe chicks, with Carl's tethered house floating above. The unit is set to "The Spirit of Adventure" from the film.
- Toy Story Units: The final unit features five separate portions: the first portion consists of a walking tinkertoy figure that squirts water through its fingers followed by the Green Army Men led by their commander, possibly Sarge. The second features Little Green Men armed with squirt guns. The third float features a large clear globe with plastic balls bouncing around inside with Buzz Lightyear atop the float in a rocket. The fourth portion features Mr. Potato Head in a construction truck that is featured in Toy Story 3. The final section, pulled by Hamm, features Rex standing atop a large Pixar Ball, holding a long bar in his mouth that acts as beam for gymnasts to swing around on, along with Woody and Jessie on a motorized teeter-totter squirting water from spring-action shooters. Slinky Dog's front portion stands on the back of the float, while his back portion walks along the route following the float creating the illusion that he is pushing the float. The unit is set to a cover version of "You've Got a Friend in Me", originally performed by Randy Newman.
- Cars Unit: (2008-2017): Bringing up the rear of the parade are Lightning McQueen and Mater from Cars. This unit was set to a cover version of "Life Is A Highway", originally performed by Tom Cochrane and later covered by Rascal Flatts for the Cars film soundtrack. The cars unit has not been seen since August 20, 2017.

=== Pixar Pals Countdown to Fun! ===
Luxo Jr, Inside Out, and Cars only appeared in the other iterations of the parade. This version of the parade re-themed the float structures to different Pixar franchises:

- The Incredibles Unit: A float of an orange tower with Mr. Incredible on top, with Frozone and Mrs. Incredible walking in front it.
- A Bug's Life Unit: A float of the bugs' circus, with Flick and Atta walking in front of it.
- Ratatouille Unit: A cheese-textured float with Remy on it, and Emile walking in front of it.
- Monsters, Inc. Unit: A float of the Monsters Inc Scare Floor, with Sully and Mike on it.
- Up Unit: A balloon-textured float with Carl Fredricksen on top, with Russel and Dug walking in front of it.
- Toy Story Unit: A float with different toys from the film series. Woody, Jessie, Lotso, Bullseye, Mr. Potato Head, and Buzz Lightyear are on the float and walking in front of it.

== Accident ==
A week after the parade debuted, an accident took place on the "A Bug's Life" float. One of the platforms on a swing in the back portion of the float broke off during a performance, but the performer had gotten off the swing before it broke. The float was taken off the corridor for almost three months, with only the front portion remaining in the parade. This accident caused Disney to suspend all acrobatic acts in the parade for a small amount of time, but they all returned less than a month after the accident. The back portion of the float itself returned to the parade in July 2008.
