= Block Party Bash =

Former Disneyland stage show and parade

Disney California Adventure
- Status: Closed
- Opening date: May 5, 2005
- Closing date: January 6, 2008
- Replaced: Disney's Eureka! A California Parade
- Replaced by: Pixar Play Parade

Disney's Hollywood Studios
- Status: Closed
- Opening date: March 14, 2008
- Closing date: January 11, 2011
- Replaced: Disney Stars and Motor Cars Parade
- Replaced by: Pixar Pals Countdown to Fun!

Ride statistics
- Attraction type: Parade
- Theme: Pixar
- Music: https://www.youtube.com/watch?v=v90oN_nzW54

Block Party Bash was a hybrid stage show and parade that played at Disney California Adventure Park from 2005 to 2008. It was relocated to Disney's Hollywood Studios in March 2008, replacing the Disney Stars and Motor Cars Parade.

== Show facts ==
It ran at Disney California Adventure from May 5, 2005 to January 6, 2008. At Disney's Hollywood Studios it ran from March 14, 2008 to January 1, 2011. It had three show stops (Summer 2005), then two show stops (Fall 2005–January 2008). The Show length was 11-minute stop, approximately 40 minutes from entrance gate to exit gate (55 minutes with three show stops). The previous parade was Disney California Adventure: Eureka! The California Adventure Parade, and at Disney's Hollywood Studios: Disney Stars and Motor Cars Parade.

== History ==
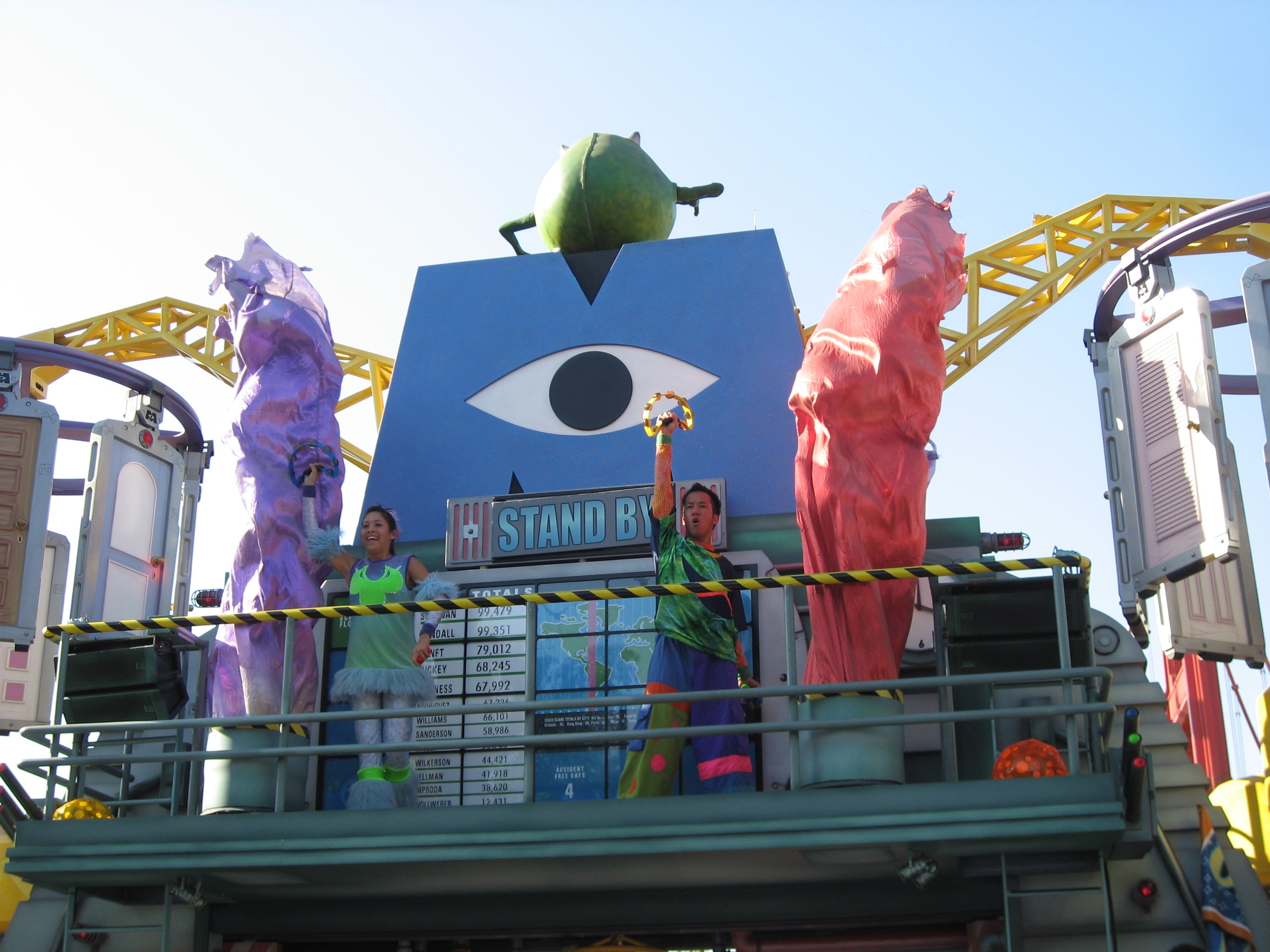
Block Party Bash at Disney's California Adventure July 2007

Block Party Bash was introduced in May 2005 in conjunction with Disneyland's 50th anniversary "Happiest Homecoming on Earth" celebration. Produced to fill the void left after the closure of Eureka!, it was conceived as more a mobile stage show than a parade. Unlike most Disney parades, Block Party Bash is an upbeat show that makes heavy use of dance music with an energetic, driving beat.

Block Party Bash featured characters from and units inspired by the Pixar films released to that point: Toy Story, The Incredibles, A Bug's Life, and Monsters, Inc. In addition to the characters, Block Party Bash featured a large number of dancers, bikers, and trampoline artists. The original cast included over 60 dancers, 16 acrobats, 12 pairs of jumping stilts and 30 electric scooters.

Following its initial season, Block Party Bash was significantly scaled down, with its original three show stops being reduced to two, the A Bug's Land stop removed, and the lighting and effects system reworked to require less manpower. The tail end of the Bug's Life unit was also scaled down by removing Dim, with the larger unit losing its trailered unit, and a few party cones.

After closing on January 6, 2008, the parade was relocated to Disney's Hollywood Studios at Walt Disney World in Florida. It premiered there on March 14, 2008—the same day that the new Pixar Play Parade debuted at Disney California Adventure.

== Show Structure ==
=== Parade Mode ===
The show travels in "parade mode" along Disney's Hollywood Studios Performance Corridor until it reaches one of two "Party Zones". At this point, many of the performers are occupied with moving the units, while others dance alongside the procession to "Celebration". The Green Army Men, along the route, encourage guests to visit a "Party Zone", where they say the real fun begins.

=== Show Stop ===
Block Party Bash moves in "Parade Mode" to one of the party zones. When the show debuted, there were three party zones; "Red" located in Sunshine Plaza, "Green" outside A Bug's Land, and "Blue" outside Golden Dreams. Upon its arrival in the party zones, the show begins. The four main units as well as smaller "block" tweeners feature Green Army Men serving as a sort of party drill sergeant. Guests are invited to join in the jumping, dancing, games, and other fun.

==== Introduction ====
- "Celebration"; the floats arrive and set up for their stop.
- "Dancing in the Street"; dance number

==== Jump ====
- "Jumpin' Jack Flash"; characters, Pixar Pal dancers, and acrobats use jump ropes and jumping stilts, encouraging the audience to jump along.

==== Scream ====
- Green Army Men host a scream contest, challenging each side of the street to beat the other.
- "Shout"; (lyrics changed to "scream").

==== Dance ====
- Dancers perform a routine featuring clips from "Gonna Make You Sweat (Everybody Dance Now)", "Dance to the Music", "(Shake, Shake, Shake) Shake Your Booty", and "Footloose".
- The audience is invited to participate in a series of popular dances: "Macarena", "Stayin' Alive", "Y.M.C.A.", "U Can't Touch This", "Whoomp! (There It Is)", "Twist and Shout", and "Do You Wanna Dance?"
- The Incredibles arrive, emerging from the block floats.

==== Finale ====
- The dancers perform a final dance number to "R.O.C.K. in the U.S.A."

==== Tear-down and return to Parade Mode ====
- The performers pack their floats back up to "You've Got a Friend in Me".
- The show returns from Parade Mode to "Celebration".

==== Gate tag ====
- Once the floats, Tweeners and Cones reach the Paradise Pier parade gate, the Pixar Pal dancers step aside to the edge of the parade route. Once the A Bug's Life float reaches the edge of the gate, the Pixar Pals dance back into the center and perform a choreographed 'tag' as the music ends.
- One by one, they dance back toward the slowly closing gate and, on the final "Celebrate!" moment, they throw dozens of custom-printed Block Party Bash Nerf balls over the gate.

=== Floats ===
The units are themed to one of three Disney-Pixar films, in this order:

- Toy Story
- A Bug's Life
- Monsters Inc.

The units are themed to one of three Disney-Pixar characters, in this order:

- Toy Story: Woody, Buzz Lightyear, Jessie, Little Bo Peep, Mr. Potato Head, Green Army Men, and Lots-o'-Huggin' Bear (Start from May 9, 2010)
- A Bug's Life: Flik, Atta, Gypsy Moth, Heimlich, and Slim
- Monsters Inc.: Mike, Sulley, Boo, George, Needlemen, and Smitty

These characters come out in the finale of the show

- The Incredibles: Mr. Incredible, Elastigirl, Frozone

Each unit consists of, in order:

- Trampoline Unit: Four-sided trampolines with a stationary spot in the middle featuring high-flying acrobats.
- Block Unit: a "tweener" unit featuring Green Army Men, prop storage, scream meters, and (later) The Incredibles.
- Two Cones: Featuring motorized scooters, banners, and beach balls.
- Main units: Elaborately decorated units based on the Pixar films, featuring Green Army Men, animatronic characters, stages, and air-guns.

In September 2006, the parade was scaled down from its original opening format. Previous to the current format of the parade, each section consisted of a trampoline, a tweener, two cones, the main unit, and 2 cones (a total for 4 cones per unit).

Each section also contains 8 dancing couples and 4 acrobats, totaling 48 dancers and 12 acrobats for the entire parade.

== Creative staff ==
- Creative Director: Steven Davison, Disney Creative Entertainment
- Show Producer: Mike Williams
- Show Director: Marilyn Magness-Carroll
- Art Director: Brad Kaye
- Technical Directors: K.C. Wilkerson, Jeff T. Miller
- Choreography: Jerry Evans, Rita May Bland, Robin Trowbridge
