= Disney's Eureka! A California Parade =

Disney's Eureka! A California Parade was a parade in Disney California Adventure at the Disneyland Resort that showed the various cultures of California. It ran from the Park's opening in 2001 to mid-2002 and was replaced three years later with Block Party Bash.

== Parade setlist ==
The parade played the song Come Away With Me, with each unit playing a variation of the song. The parade consisted of:

- Opening unit (Main Song)
- Hispanic California (Song performed in both English and Spanish)
- Los Angeles (Song performed as a Rap)
- Outdoor California (Instrumental beach rock cover)
- Chinatown (Instrumental Chinese cover)
- Golden State Finale (Combination of the Opening, Hispanic, and Los Angeles Units)
