= Jubilation! =

Defunct parade at Tokyo Disneyland

Tokyo Disneyland
- Status: Removed
- Opening date: April 15, 2008
- Closing date: April 5, 2013
- Replaced: Disney's Dreams on Parade: Moving On
- Replaced by: Happiness is Here Parade

Ride statistics
- Attraction type: Parade
- Designer: Walt Disney Creative Entertainment
- Theme: Joy and Celebration
- Music: Treasure the Moment/ Your Heart Will Lead You Home
- Duration: 20 minutes
- Sponsor: NTT Docomo
- Wheelchair accessible

Jubilation! was a daytime parade from Tokyo Disneyland that ran from 2008 to 2013.

== History ==
The parade began April 15, 2008 in honor of the 25th anniversary of Tokyo Disney Resort and Tokyo Disneyland. It consists of nine colorful floats that feature several Disney characters in fantastical worlds. Minnie Mouse leads the parade and Mickey Mouse and friends close it.

During the 25th anniversary year, from April 15, 2008 to April 14, 2009, the parade would stop for show mode four times during its course, once in part A and once in part B at every section of the parade route. The average number of show mode stops for a Tokyo Disneyland parade is three. In the show mode, a specially arranged version of the song "What Time Is It?" from High School Musical 2 mixed in with the 25th Anniversary theme song "Dream Goes On" would play and guests would be asked to clap their hands and dance along in celebration. Since April 2009, the parade has carried out without stopping for a show mode and removed the "25" from the final float.

== Parade units ==
- Opening Unit: Minnie Mouse, Blue Fairy and Flora, Fauna and Merryweather.
- Princess Garden Unit: This pageantry of princesses celebrates Disney royalty. Cinderella and Belle accompanied by their respective princes, ride in a garden of topiaries with woodland creatures, birds and more. Cinderella's dress playfully twirls like a turntable, while Swan Court couples lead the 50-foot-long majestic float, capped off with a special appearance by Princess Aurora.
- Forest Friends Unit: Characters from Song of the South, The Many Adventures of Winnie the Pooh, Pocahontas and Fantasia 2000 feature in this float.
- Jungle Safari Unit: Simba from the 1994 animated film The Lion King, and Baloo and Mowgli from the 1967 animated film The Jungle Book feature in this float. A high rock overlooks the exuberant jungle flora, while the percussion and shimmering colours release the wild instincts of an exotic world.
- Lilo & Stitch Unit: Based on the 2002 animated film.
- Pirate Moon Unit: Based on the 1953 animated film Peter Pan. From Skull Rock to another, this one is in the shape of a skull and serves as the throne of Captain Hook. Peter Pan is close by, at the helm of a ship suspended beneath an immense, dreamlike moon.
- Bubbles Unit: This unit culminates with a 90-foot-long magical caravan of characters featuring The Three Little Pigs, Pinocchio and Dumbo. The circus clowns were in a splashy carnival of color. There's Pegasus horses, The Hippos and The Alligators from Fantasia, also the sassy Bubble Girls and The Ringmaster celebrating as well.
- Pixar Pals Unit: Characters from Toy Story, Monsters, Inc. and The Incredibles feature in this float. A half of the float that features a large clear globe with plastic balls bouncing around inside with Buzz Lightyear atop the float in a rocket, was rumored to receive a twin for Disney California Adventure's daytime parade Pixar Play Parade. The Little Green Men spaceship (but cannot move), Mr. Incredible and Elastigirl ride on the individual "hovercraft" which were a rumored to receive a twin for Pixar Play Parade as well.
- Finale: Mickey Mouse and his friends, Pluto, Goofy, Donald Duck, Daisy Duck, Chip 'n' Dale, Clarice and Tinkerbell.

== After being replaced ==
After the parade was replaced with Happiness is Here Parade, the Princess Garden and Bubbles units were relocated to the Magic Kingdom and are used for their current daytime parade called Festival of Fantasy Parade. The Jungle Safari and Pirate Moon units were relocated to Disneyland Park in Paris and is used for their current daytime parade called Disney Stars on Parade, which premiered in 2017 as part of the park's 25th anniversary celebration. A few of the performers' costumes from the Jungle Safari and Lilo & Stitch units were rumored to receive a twin to Disneyland's daytime parade Mickey's Soundsational Parade's The Little Mermaid unit. The individual "hovercraft" from the Pixar Pals unit were relocated to Disneyland Paris and used for some of their special events. The Little Green Men spaceship from the Pixar Pals unit were relocated to Disneyland and used for the nighttime parade Paint The Night Parade.

== See also ==
- Pixar Play Parade
- Mickey's Soundsational Parade
