= Disney Dreams! =

Former nighttime fireworks and projection show

Disneyland Park (Paris)
- Status: Closed
- Soft opening date: 31 March 2012
- Opening date: 1 April 2012 (original); 12 April 2023 (revival)
- Closing date: 24 March 2017 (original); 30 May 2024 (revival)
- Replaced: The Enchanted Fireworks; Disney Illuminations (original)
- Replaced by: Disney Illuminations (updated)

Ride statistics
- Attraction type: Multimedia, water, pyrotechnic show
- Designer: Disney Live Entertainment
- Theme: Dreams and Disney's animated films
- Music: Joel McNeely
- Duration: 20–22 minutes
- Hosts: Peter Pan (Blayne Weaver) & Wendy Darling (Hynden Walch)
- Languages: English; French
- Sponsor: PANDORA
- Wheelchair accessible

Disney Dreams! was a nighttime spectacular at Disneyland Park in Disneyland Paris. Designed specially for the park's 20th anniversary in 2012, the show originally ran from 1 April 2012 to 24 March 2017, when it was replaced by Disney Illuminations. A revival of the show premiered on 12 April 2023, as part of the park's extended 30th anniversary celebrations, and as part of the Disney 100 Years of Wonder celebrations.

Conceived by World of Color creator Steve Davison, the show features projection mapping onto the park's castle, fireworks, water fountains, fire, music, lasers, searchlights, mist screens and other special effects.

== Plot ==
The story of Dreams is based on numerous Disney films and franchises such as Peter Pan, Disney Villains and Disney Princesses. Peter Pan's shadow escapes from him once again and ruins the magic of the star. The dripping magic sparkle shapes into Lumière from Beauty and the Beast. Peter's shadow goes through a number of Disney films, including Ratatouille, Aladdin, The Hunchback of Notre Dame, The Lion King, Brave, Tangled, and The Princess and the Frog.

Peter's shadow is captured by Dr. Facilier and threatened by other Disney villains. Peter's shadow is then returned to Peter Pan and tries to defeat Captain Hook. Peter spots Tinker Bell and tells her to put the magic of the Second Star where it belongs.

At the end, Peter and Wendy fly off as Wendy says "On s'envole Peter! On s'envole!" ("We fly away, Peter! We fly away!") to the music of "You Can Fly!" which is followed by a short reprise of "The Second Star to the Right".

== Show history ==
Since spring 2011, Dreams began testing with original projector animations but, in late 2011, some scenes that were tested in early 2011 were deleted and others were changed. Using the technique of projection mapping, the castle can be visually transformed in numerous ways such as shrinking, spinning and turrets flipping. In February and March 2012, users were posting pictures and videos of Dreams.

=== Original run (2012–2017) ===
In late February, DLRP Today reported that the premiere of Disney Dreams! would be broadcast live on French TV network MYTF1 hosted by E! France host Sandrine Quétier. Also reported was that Dreams would be simultaneously broadcast live on the official Disneyland Paris YouTube channel. On 31 March at 10:30pm, the live broadcast was discovered to be a pre-recorded version of Dreams from when it was being tested.

In 2013, the show introduced two new scenes from The Lion King and Brave. The two scenes replaced the original Mary Poppins and Jungle Book scenes. In addition, the Disney Light Ears were introduced, which are remotely controlled light-up ears that are synced to the show. LEDs inside the ears light up in a variety of different colours. The Light Ears (known as "Glow with the Show" Ears in the US) debuted in 2012 at Disney California Adventure for World of Color and eventually made its way to Disneyland Park in California and Walt Disney World in Florida for Fantasmic! and all of its firework shows.

In 2015, a new scene from Frozen was introduced, replacing the scene from Brave, as part of the Frozen Summer Fun celebrations. The Brave sequence was then reinstated in its place after the celebration ended. Both The Lion King and Brave sequences remained in the show until its first closing in March 2017.

Dreams was replaced by Disney Illuminations, as part of the resort's 25th Anniversary celebrations. The show had its first closure on 24 March 2017 (originally announced to be 25 March), with Illuminations beginning on 26 March.

==== Disney Dreams of Christmas! ====
On 10 November 2013, a full-length show titled Disney Dreams of Christmas! debuted. Sharing similar elements with Disney California Adventure's World of Color: Winter Dreams, the show is hosted bilingually by Olaf (English) and Anna (French) from Frozen. The show celebrates the winter season with several holiday-themed segments, featuring scenes from Frozen, Toy Story, Bambi, Fantasia, One Hundred and One Dalmatians, Mickey's Christmas Carol, Lady and the Tramp, Melody Time, and various vintage Mickey Mouse shorts. The show incorporates traditional holiday-related music, including "Sleigh Ride", "Carol of the Bells", "Let it Snow", "It's the Most Wonderful Time of the Year", "Believe", "Silent Night", the "Nutcracker Suite", "Jingle Bells", and "Joy to the World". The show's theme song, "Make a Wish", is sung by Heather Headley.

For the 2014 Christmas season, Disney Dreams of Christmas! was reprogrammed to reflect some of the changes made to its Californian cousin. Several show scenes were reorganized, including the Frozen section (extending it with two additional songs, "In Summer" and "Love Is an Open Door" sung in French) and the Toy Story Nutcracker section (shortening it with three cut songs). The penultimate sing-along scene was also cut in the new version.

The show originally ran from 10 November 2013 to 8 January 2017.

The show was revived and included in the 2022–2023 Christmas season programming. Running from 12 November 2022 to 8 January 2023, the 2014–2017 iteration of the show is used and is bookended by the existing Disney D-Light pre-show and a new post-show called Follow the Light (both designed for the park's 30th Anniversary celebrations). The revival also introduced new LED mesh screens that were placed on some of the castle's roofs, replacing the long-used light cages since 2004.

=== 2023 revival ===
Despite its closure, Dreams was temporarily revived several times throughout the run of Illuminations, oftentimes for paid after-hours events for the resort's Annual Passholders (AP). The show in its entirety was brought back during Mickey Mouse's 90th Birthday Party AP event in 2018, while its finale was used to close the Mickey's Magical Souvenirs show that was presented during the 30th Anniversary AP Party in 2022.

Dreams was revived as part of the resort's 30th anniversary "Grand Finale", replacing Illuminations. The revival premiered on 12 April 2023, the park's 31st anniversary and 11 years since its debut. The 2013–2014 version of the show (which includes the replacement The Lion King and Brave sections) is used. An updated version of the Disney D-Light pre-show that was introduced in 2022 is also presented before each show. The show also uses the new LED mesh screens installed on the castle roofs for the Dreams of Christmas! revival in 2022.

From 24 April until late September 2023, due to the aftermath of Fantasmic! Maleficent animatronic dragon fire at Disneyland in Anaheim, California, the fire effects had temporarily cut from the show. They have since been restored.

On 8 May 2024, following the announcement, Disneyland Paris announced that the final performance of the revamped version of this show will end on 30 May 2024, and it will be replaced by the return of Disney Illuminations on 31 May 2024, with new technology that currently utilized for Dreams that returned on 12 April 2023.

== Music ==
Joel McNeely composed the music for the show, which was performed by the London Symphony Orchestra, Cara Dillon, a children's choir and an adult choir. Some music pieces for the show are from the 2002 film Return to Never Land, which he also scored.

=== Current soundtrack (2023 revival) ===
- Opening titles: "You Can Fly!", "Never Smile at a Crocodile", and "A Pirate's Life" from Return to Never Land
- "The Second Star to the Right" (performed bilingually in English and French) from Peter Pan
- "Be Our Guest" (performed in French) from Beauty and the Beast
- "Le Festin" from Ratatouille
- "Friend Like Me" from Aladdin
- "Out There" (performed in French) from The Hunchback of Notre Dame
- "Circle of Life", "I Just Can't Wait to Be King", and "Hakuna Matata" from The Lion King †
- "Fate and Destiny", "Touch the Sky", and "Remember to Smile" from Brave †‡
- "I See the Light" from Tangled
- "Friends on the Other Side" from The Princess and the Frog
- Finale: "You Can Fly!" and "The Second Star to the Right" (reprise) from Peter Pan
- Exit music: "Come Dream A Dream" by Cara Dillon and Sam Lakeman †

† – replaced the original sections from the 2012 premiere ("Step in Time" from Mary Poppins, "I Wan'na Be Like You (The Monkey Song)" from The Jungle Book respectively. "Come Dream A Dream" replaced "Un monde qui s'illumine" by Chantry Johnson, Noemie Legrand, and Tony Ferrari from 1 October 2023 at the end of the park's 30th anniversary celebrations) ‡ – replaced by "Let It Go" from Frozen in 2015 and 2016

== Technology ==
The show is known to use a large amount of audio-visual, lighting, pyrotechnic and hydrotechnic technology.

The show is controlled from a specially built control room, delivered by special convoy and themed as a small Victorian-themed garden shed on the Central Plaza facing the castle. 70 km of fibre optics allow the show to be managed from this location. The show is operated by a main controller with three technicians to look after audio, video and special effects. However other technicians are placed at around the Castle to ensure the smooth running of the show, especially at the firing points. In total, twenty people are necessary at each performance.

=== Projection ===
16 Christie video projectors were originally used throughout the show to projection map onto the 2,500 sqm castle which has been 3D scanned to create a computer model. Four projectors are installed on the roof of Main Street buildings, with an additional eight in purpose-built locations around the moat and viewing area. The other four were used to project onto the water screens either side of the moat. Windscreen wipers are in use to keep the projection glass clear. Although no exact details have been released by Disney, a behind the scenes video on their official YouTube channel shows a GrandMA2 and Hippo Media Servers, Hippotizers, in use in the control booth for the show.

With the removal of the water screens in 2017 in preparation for Illuminations, the four projectors used for that effect were removed. In preparation for the 2023 revival of Dreams, the remaining 12 LED-lamp projectors were replaced with laser-lamp ones to improve show quality of the projected images and consume less electricity.

=== Sound ===
The pre-recorded soundtrack for the show is played through speakers around the Central Plaza viewing area. Originally recorded in stereo, the soundtrack was updated to a 4.1 mix for the 2023 revival.

=== Lighting ===
10 moving lights or "skytracers" were originally installed either side of the Castle for aerial effects while four lasers are used on the roofs of main street, in the castle and inside the 'Second Star to the Right' at the top of the castle. For the 2023 revival, an additional 18 laser-lamp type skytracers were installed. In Summer 2013, audience members were able take part in the show with Disney Dreams Light'Ears that were synchronized with the show using infrared technology.

LED mesh screens were directly installed on several castle roofs for the 2022 revival of Dreams! of Christmas to create additional lighting effects on the roofs and accentuate the projections. Additional mesh screens were installed on the remaining roofs in time for the 2023 revival of Dreams, notably on the rightmost tower.

=== Pyrotechnics ===
The two main firework launch points are located on the roofs of Fantasyland while pyrotechnics are used on the castle itself. There are a total of 58 launching points on the castle and a further 18 behind it. 15 isopar flamethrowers with telescopic arms are located around the castle building, projecting fire up to 15 meters into the air, with heat that can be felt by the audience. Each flamethrower has a weather station that prevents the device from firing in unsuitable weather conditions, in order to prevent damage to the castle.

=== Hydrotechnics ===
Disney Dreams! utilises 37 fixed and 6 moving fountains which are capable of firing water up to 40 meters high. Featuring LEDs at their base, the patented designs have been used at Disney California Adventure in World of Color. Two retractable mist screens were also used as additional projection surfaces used periodically throughout the show. These systems use recycled water from the castle's moat while a fog generator operates with drinking water for hygiene purposes. The mist screens were removed in 2017 during the preparation for Illuminations, and did not return for the 2023 revival; the scenes formerly projected onto them are projected onto the castle instead.

=== Pre-shows ===
Premiering on 5 March 2022 for the park's 30th Anniversary, the Disney D-Light pre-show played before the nightly presentation of Disney Dreams during the park's 30th anniversary celebration. It has an original score based on several musical themes from Disney films and the park's anniversary theme song, "Un monde qui s'illumine". Choreographed light drones form several images above the castle, including the Second Star to the Right, a shooting star, and the Mickey Mouse-shaped 30th Anniversary logo. The second version of the pre-show was supposed to premiere on 12 April 2023 alongside Disney Dreams, but due to wind, it premiered the next day instead. Disney D-Light had its last performance on 30 September, the end of the 30th Anniversary celebrations.

From 1 October this was replaced by a projection show Nightfall with Disney Villains, which does not use drones.

A new show called Disney Electrical Sky Parade, inspired by Disneyland Paris version of Main Street Electrical Parade, temporarily premiered on 8 January 2024, as part of Disney Symphony of Colours celebration. The show was initially expected to run until 30 September 2024, but was later extended to 6 January 2025, with it from 31 May onwards serves as a pre-show for Disney Illuminations when the latter returns.

== See also ==
- Once Upon a Time, a show inspired by Disney Dreams.
- Disneyland Forever, a show inspired by Once Upon a Time and some scenes from Disney Dreams was borrowed here.
- Happily Ever After, a show similar to the others with the name being taken from Once Upon a Time.
- Wondrous Journeys, a show similar to Happily Ever After.
