= Disney Movie Magic =

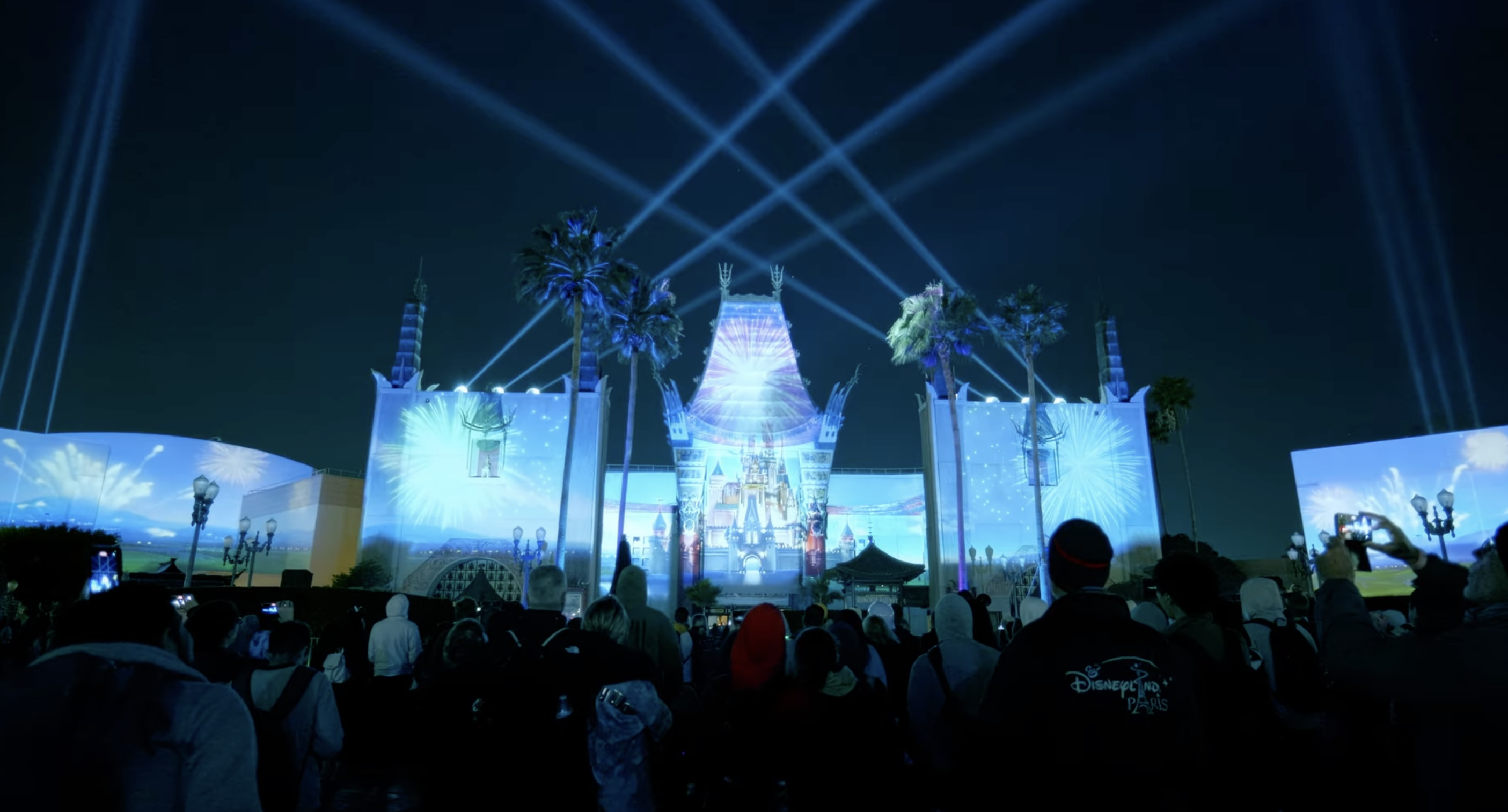

Disney's Hollywood Studios
- Area: Hollywood Boulevard
- Status: Operating
- Opening date: May 26, 2017 (original); November 7, 2021 (reopening)
- Closing date: April 30, 2019 (original)
- Replaced: Star Wars: A Galactic Spectacular
- Replaced by: Wonderful World of Animation

Ride statistics
- Attraction type: Projection mapping show

Disney Movie Magic is a nighttime projection mapping show that debuted at Disney's Hollywood Studios, Walt Disney World on May 26, 2017. It is projected onto the façade of the park's Chinese Theater (Mickey and Minnie's Runaway Railway). It features the live-action films from Walt Disney Studios. The show was temporarily replaced by a new show, Wonderful World of Animation, as part of the park's 30th anniversary celebration.

Disney Movie Magic was originally supposed to return for a 2020 limited run on March 13, which would have included a brand new sequence to coincide with the theatrical release of Mulan, but it instead remained closed due to the coronavirus outbreaks. An updated version of the show returned in November 2021 as part of Walt Disney World's 50th anniversary celebration, running alongside Wonderful World of Animation.

== Projections ==
The main projections included:

- "Be Our Guest" scene from Beauty and the Beast
- "Step in Time" scene from Mary Poppins
- The Jungle Book
- Pirates of the Caribbean
- Indiana Jones
- A Wrinkle in Time (2018 original version)
- Mulan (2021 updated version)
- Tron: Legacy
- Doctor Strange
- Guardians of the Galaxy

Other snippets in between include:

- Old Yeller
- Into the Woods
- Saving Mr. Banks
- Queen of Katwe
- The Finest Hours
- Alice in Wonderland
- Pete's Dragon
- Bedknobs and Broomsticks
- Good Morning, Vietnam
- The Rocketeer
- 20,000 Leagues Under the Sea
- Zorro
- Miracle
- Sky High
- Darby O'Gill and the Little People
- The Nightmare Before Christmas
- The Muppets
- Maleficent
- Who Framed Roger Rabbit
- The Black Hole
- Cinderella
- 101 Dalmatians
- Remember the Titans
- Oz the Great and Powerful
- Lt. Robin Crusoe USN
- Sister Act
- The Game Plan
- Newsies
- The Santa Clause
