= Wonderful World of Animation =

Nighttime show at Disney's Hollywood Studios

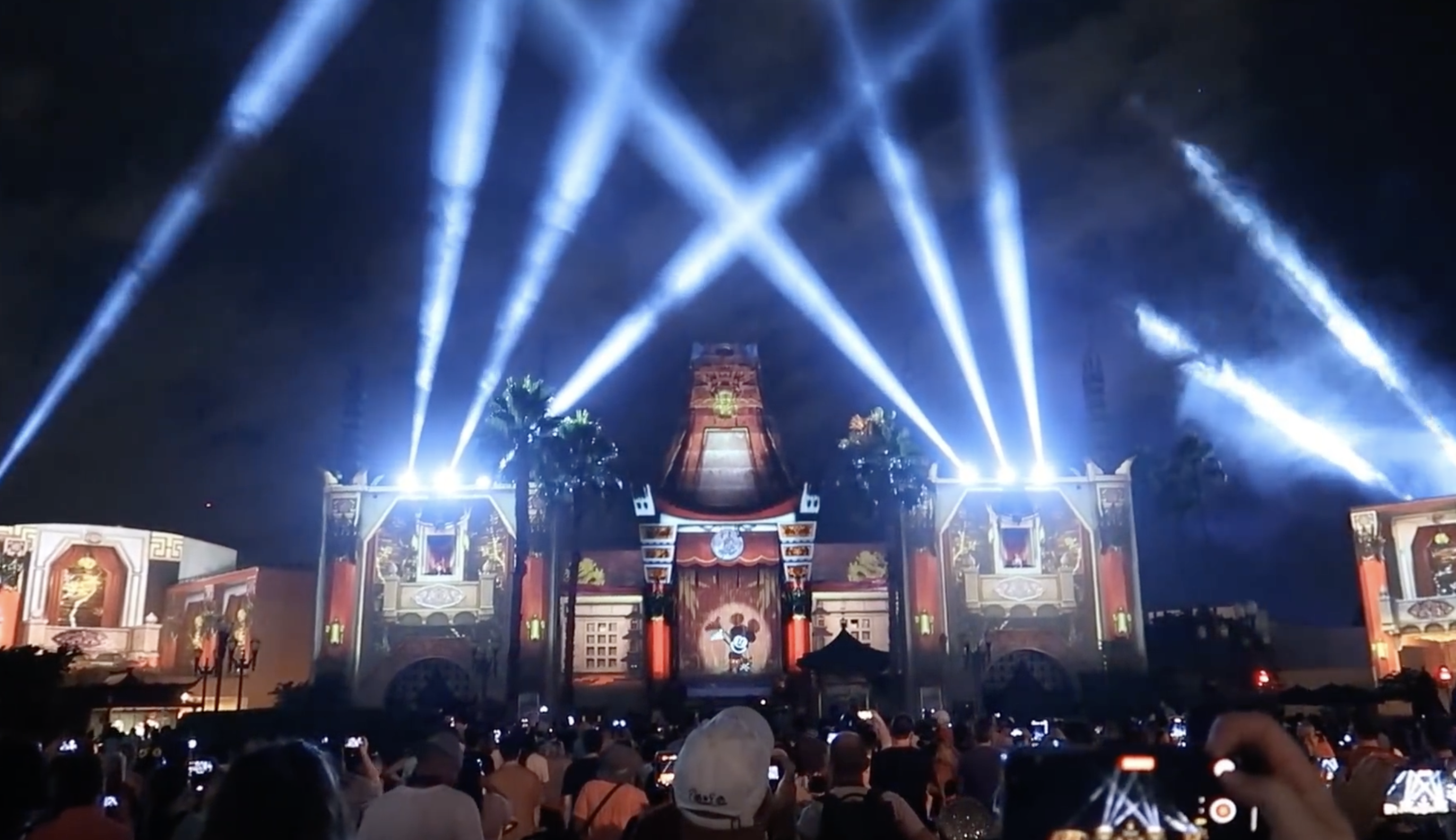

Disney's Hollywood Studios
- Area: Hollywood Boulevard
- Status: Operating
- Opening date: May 1, 2019 (original); August 1, 2021 (reopening)
- Closing date: May 13, 2020 (original)
- Replaced: Disney Movie Magic

Ride statistics
- Attraction type: Fireworks spectacular and multimedia show
- Theme: Animation

Wonderful World of Animation is a nighttime show at Disney's Hollywood Studios. The show is a celebration of all Disney animation (including Pixar), beginning with Mickey Mouse. It premiered on May 1, 2019, as part of the park's 30th anniversary celebration, replacing Disney Movie Magic.

It was originally set to close on May 13, 2020, but it closed early on March 16, due to the COVID-19 outbreak, and was replaced by an updated version of Disney Movie Magic.

An updated version of the show returned on August 1, 2021, as part of Walt Disney World's 50th Anniversary celebration.

== Summary ==
The show kicks off with a tribute to the beginning of Disney animation, Mickey Mouse, followed by segments highlighting a number of animated feature films, including Snow White and the Seven Dwarfs, Sleeping Beauty, The Little Mermaid, Beauty and the Beast, Aladdin, Lilo & Stitch, Finding Nemo, The Incredibles, Frozen, Big Hero 6, Zootopia, Cars 3, Coco and Ralph Breaks the Internet. There is also a Disney Villains segment, highlighted by Tamatoa, Hades, and Yzma.

== Show scenes ==
- Opening
  - Mickey's Gala Premiere
- Magic
  - "The Sorcerer's Apprentice" (Fantasia)
  - "Friend Like Me" (Aladdin)
  - "Let It Go" (Frozen)
    - Brother Bear
    - Pinocchio
    - Sleeping Beauty
    - Cinderella
    - The Princess and the Frog
    - The Sword in the Stone
    - Tangled
- Family
  - "The World Es Mi Familia" (Coco)
  - "Hawaiian Roller Coaster Ride" (Lilo & Stitch)
  - "Beyond the Sea" (Finding Nemo/Finding Dory)
    - Sleeping Beauty
    - Pocahontas
    - Brave
    - The Princess and the Frog
    - Tarzan
    - The Rescuers
    - Frozen
    - Bambi
    - Dumbo
    - Hercules
    - One Hundred and One Dalmatians
    - Pinocchio
    - Moana
    - Zootopia
    - Tangled
    - Peter Pan
    - Inside Out
    - Lady and the Tramp
    - The Little Mermaid
    - Mulan
    - Big Hero 6
    - The Good Dinosaur
    - The Lion King
    - Meet the Robinsons
- Action
  - "The Glory Days" (The Incredibles/Incredibles 2)
  - "Try Everything" (Zootopia)
  - "Life is a Highway" (Cars/Cars 2/Cars 3)
    - Coco
    - Peter Pan
    - Aladdin
    - Up
    - Hercules
    - The Many Adventures of Winnie the Pooh
    - The Princess and the Frog
    - Big Hero 6
    - Mulan
    - Robin Hood
    - The Emperor's New Groove
    - Tarzan
    - Toy Story
    - Pinocchio
    - The Great Mouse Detective
    - Snow White and the Seven Dwarfs
    - Finding Nemo
    - Beauty and the Beast
    - Toy Story 2
    - Ralph Breaks the Internet
    - Alice in Wonderland
    - Bolt
    - The Black Cauldron
    - Tangled
    - Frozen
    - Sleeping Beauty
    - The Little Mermaid
    - Brave
    - The Lion King
    - Pocahontas
    - Treasure Planet
- Love
  - "Once Upon a Dream" (Sleeping Beauty)
  - "Kiss the Girl" (The Little Mermaid)
  - "Beauty and the Beast" (Beauty and the Beast)
    - Bambi
    - Monsters, Inc.
    - Lady and the Tramp
    - The Princess and the Frog
    - The Rescuers Down Under
    - Hercules
    - Toy Story 3
    - Cinderella
    - Frozen
    - Tarzan
    - WALL-E
    - Wreck-It Ralph
    - The Lion King
    - Up
    - Snow White and the Seven Dwarfs
    - One Hundred and One Dalmatians
    - Aladdin
    - Tangled
- Villains
  - "Shiny" (Moana)
  - "The Gospel Truth" (Hercules)
  - "Perfect World" (The Emperor's New Groove)
    - The Sword in the Stone
    - The Princess and the Frog
    - Inside Out
    - Toy Story 2
    - The Jungle Book
    - Finding Nemo
    - Toy Story 3
    - Cinderella
    - Tangled
    - Monsters University
    - Robin Hood
    - Meet the Robinsons
    - Beauty and the Beast
    - Coco
    - One Hundred and One Dalmatians
    - The Incredibles
    - Alice in Wonderland
    - Zootopia
    - Aladdin
    - Frozen
    - Peter Pan
    - Lady and the Tramp
- Friendship
  - "When Can I See You Again?" (Wreck-It Ralph/Ralph Breaks the Internet)
  - "The Silly Song" (Snow White and the Seven Dwarfs)
  - "Immortals" (Big Hero 6)
    - Aladdin
    - Toy Story 2
    - Oliver & Company
    - Atlantis: The Lost Empire
    - Zootopia
    - The Jungle Book
    - The Fox and the Hound
    - The Good Dinosaur
    - Moana
    - Monsters, Inc.
    - Hercules
    - The Little Mermaid
    - Mulan
    - Up
    - The Many Adventures of Winnie the Pooh
    - Toy Story 3
    - Tarzan
    - Inside Out
    - Beauty and the Beast
    - Peter Pan
- Back to the Past
  - Encanto
  - Luca
  - Raya and the Last Dragon
  - Soul
  - Onward
  - Frozen II
  - Toy Story 4
  - Ralph Breaks the Internet
  - Incredibles 2
  - Coco
  - Cars 3
  - Moana
  - Finding Dory
  - Zootopia
  - The Good Dinosaur
  - Inside Out
  - Big Hero 6
  - Frozen
  - Monsters University
  - Wreck-It Ralph
  - Brave
  - Winnie the Pooh
  - Cars 2
  - Tangled
  - Toy Story 3
  - The Princess and the Frog
  - Up
  - Bolt
  - WALL-E
  - Ratatouille
  - Meet the Robinsons
  - Cars
  - Chicken Little
  - The Incredibles
  - Home on the Range
  - Brother Bear
  - Finding Nemo
  - Treasure Planet
  - Lilo & Stitch
  - Monsters, Inc.
  - Atlantis: The Lost Empire
  - The Emperor's New Groove
  - Dinosaur
  - Fantasia 2000
  - Toy Story 2
  - Tarzan
  - A Bug's Life
  - Mulan
  - Hercules
  - The Hunchback of Notre Dame
  - Toy Story
  - Pocahontas
  - The Lion King
  - Aladdin
  - Beauty and the Beast
  - The Rescuers Down Under
  - The Little Mermaid
  - Oliver & Company
  - The Great Mouse Detective
  - The Black Cauldron
  - The Fox and the Hound
  - The Rescuers
  - The Many Adventures of Winnie the Pooh
  - Robin Hood
  - The Aristocats
  - The Jungle Book
  - The Sword in the Stone
  - One Hundred and One Dalmatians
  - Sleeping Beauty
  - Lady and the Tramp
  - Peter Pan
  - Alice in Wonderland
  - Cinderella
  - The Adventures of Ichabod and Mr. Toad
  - Melody Time
  - Fun and Fancy Free
  - Make Mine Music
  - The Three Caballeros
  - Saludos Amigos
  - Bambi
  - Dumbo
  - Fantasia
  - Pinocchio
  - Snow White and the Seven Dwarfs
- It All Started with a Mouse
  - Steamboat Willie
  - Thru the Mirror
  - The Band Concert
  - Magician Mickey
  - Get a Horse!
  - Runaway Brain
  - The Simple Things
  - Gulliver Mickey
  - Mickey and the Seal
  - Mr. Mouse Takes a Trip
  - Mickey Mouse
