= Mickey's WaterWorks =

Former parade at Hong Kong Disneyland (2007-2013)

Hong Kong Disneyland
- Status: Removed
- Opening date: July 14, 2007
- Closing date: August 31, 2013
- Replaced by: Pixar Water Street Party!

Ride statistics
- Attraction type: Parade
- Sponcor: Bonaqua

Mickey's WaterWorks was the summertime parade at Hong Kong Disneyland from 2007-2013. It was originally created exclusively for Hong Kong Disneyland for the 2007 summer season by Walt Disney Creative Entertainment, and was presented by Bonaqua Drinking Water. Although Mickey's WaterWorks officially began its run on July 14 of that year, it made its debut one week earlier. The only year it didn't run during its run was in 2011, when Hong Kong Disneyland continued on with their Flights of Fantasy Parade. This parade has not run since summer 2013.

== History ==
As the title suggests, Mickey's WaterWorks is a splashy parade created to refresh and bring watery fun to guests from all walks of life. The parade showcases how Mickey Mouse and more than 30 other Disney characters keep Hong Kong Disneyland's landscape looking so beautiful and lush. However, guests viewing the parade must be aware that water is everywhere on the route, except for the Dry Areas of the route located by signs along the route.

Favorite Disney characters, some of whom had never appeared at Hong Kong Disneyland before (such as the Big Bad Wolf and Pinocchio) prior to the debut of this parade, entertain guests with a water-filled extravaganza of music, dance and a host of colorful themed floats together with over 100 performers (including said 30 characters) set to an original score.
