= Finding Nemo (soundtrack) =

Finding Nemo (Original Motion Picture Soundtrack)

Film score by Thomas Newman
- Released: May 20, 2003
- Recorded: 2002–2003
- Studios: Sony Scoring Stage, Culver City; Signet Sound Studios, Los Angeles; The Village, West Los Angeles
- Genre: Film score
- Length: 59:40
- Label: Walt Disney
- Producer: Thomas Newman

Thomas Newman chronology
White Oleander (2002)	Finding Nemo (2003)	Lemony Snicket's A Series of Unfortunate Events (2004)

Finding Nemo (Original Motion Picture Soundtrack) is the soundtrack to the 2003 Disney/Pixar film of the same name. Featuring the original score composed and conducted by Thomas Newman, the cousin of Randy Newman, who had previously collaborated with Pixar on Toy Story (1995), A Bug's Life (1998), Toy Story 2 (1999) and Monsters, Inc. (2001). The album consists of 39 instrumental tracks from Thomas' score and a cover of Bobby Darin's 1959 single "Beyond The Sea" (which is also a cover of the 1945 single "La Mer" by Charles Trenet) performed by Robbie Williams, released by Walt Disney Records on May 20, 2003.

== Background ==
"The ideas were as much about how music was transitioning from moment to moment or feeling to feeling, as much as the individual feelings or moments themselves. So it's a lot more effort. There's a lot more notes, and there's a lot more things that animation has to do."

— Thomas Newman

Finding Nemo was the first Pixar film not to be scored by Randy Newman. Instead, his cousin Thomas was recruited to score the film, for whom it marked his first score for an animated film. Director Andrew Stanton mainlined Thomas' scores for the dramatic films The Shawshank Redemption (1994), Meet Joe Black and The Horse Whisperer (both 1998) while writing the script, up to the point where he felt like the composer was an essential character in the film and his music helped him set the script's tone. Newman said that "In animation, action is changing so quickly that there's really not a lot of suspended moments. In live-action, sometimes a mood or a feeling can go on for quite a while. Animation is a lot more effort. There are a lot more notes."

In contrast the exuberant music composed by Randy for previous Pixar films such as Toy Story and Monsters, Inc., Thomas had a "more fluid and emotionally atmospheric" score which suited the tone of Finding Nemo. Another approach for the film's music is instead of having metal sounds and colors to give a kind of watery feeling which was onomatopoetic, he approached for a low hum of ocean and underwater sound, which was enough to imply water as opposed to restating it over and over again.

== Reception ==
The score received widespread acclaim from critics. Filmtracks.com wrote "the phenomenal diversity of Tom [Thomas] Newman's selection of dozens upon dozens of specialty instruments and electronic sounds, as well as those rumbling pianos and choppy strings, is what floats his music for Finding Nemo. As unlikely as his involvement with the project may have initially seemed, he made it work, and even if it didn't resemble any other Disney score in history, you can't help but applaud the risk that was taken, as well as Tom Newman's answer to the challenge." Noah Marconi of Soundtrack World wrote "Despite minimal melodic material, Newman binds the score with his characteristic orchestration, string gestures and harmonies." James Southall of Movie Wave called it as "easily the best score of the year".

Music critic Jonathan Broxton commented that the score Finding Nemo as an "amalgam of best Thomas Newman scores ever heard" but criticised the "lack of thematic material". Music critic Alex Burns wrote "Thomas Newman's score throughout Finding Nemo is really effective with some exciting twists and turns". Reviewing the main title "Nemo Egg", he called "serves its purpose of setting the scene of the film, with Newman's colourful scoring shining through. A calm and peaceful opening before the chaos begins." Heather Phares of AllMusic wrote "From dreamy to scary to silly, each of Newman's 39 cues for Finding Nemo is a wonderfully intricate, miniature composition. While this score may not be quite as dazzling as his work on scores like American Beauty, this is still a thoughtful and rewarding collection of music that is absolutely perfect for the film it supports."

Ranking it as one of Newman's best soundtracks, Natasha McMeekin of Collider commented that the score "not only embodies the movie's characters and their subsequent emotions, but the sea itself — calm, beautiful, soothing, but at the same time, harsh, unforgiving, and unpredictable." It was also ranked fifth on the "Best Pixar Scores" by Maria M. on MovieWeb who further commented "The depth of the score showcases Newman's attention to detail and ability to compose pieces that add another layer to the story."

== Track listing ==
No.	Title	Artist(s)	Length
1.	"Wow"		2:31
2.	"Barracuda"		1:27
3.	"Nemo Egg (Main Title)"		1:16
4.	"First Day"		1:15
5.	"Field Trip"		0:57
6.	"Mr. Ray, Scientist"		1:28
7.	"The Divers"		1:56
8.	"Lost"		1:01
9.	"Short-Term Dory"		0:43
10.	"Why Trust a Shark?"		1:17
11.	"Friends Not Food"		1:50
12.	"Fish-O-Rama"		0:29
13.	"Gill"		1:39
14.	"Mt. Wannahockaloogie"		1:20
15.	"Foolproof"		0:32
16.	"Squishy"		1:32
17.	"Jellyfish Forest"		1:32
18.	"Stay Awake"		1:47
19.	"School of Fish"		1:02
20.	"Filter Attempt"		2:05
21.	"The Turtle Lope"		2:04
22.	"Curl Away My Son"		1:28
23.	"News Travels"		1:12
24.	"The Little Clownfish from the Reef"		1:14
25.	"Darla Filth Offramp"		2:20
26.	"Lost in Fog"		1:05
27.	"Scum Angel"		1:22
28.	"Haiku"		1:41
29.	"Time to Let Go"		2:22
30.	"Sydney Harbour"		0:25
31.	"Pelicans"		1:12
32.	"Drill"		0:50
33.	"Fish in My Hair!"		1:29
34.	"All Drains Lead to the Ocean"		1:36
35.	"...P. Sherman, 42 Wallaby Way, Sydney..."		0:36
36.	"Fishing Grounds"		1:41
37.	"Swim Down"		1:45
38.	"Finding Nemo"		1:19
39.	"Fronds Like These"		1:54
40.	"Beyond the Sea"	Robbie Williams	4:26
Total length:			59:40

== Accolades ==
Awards
Year	Association	Award Category	Recipient (if any)	Result
2004	Academy Awards	Best Original Score	Thomas Newman	Nominated
2004	Annie Awards	Outstanding Music in an Animated Feature Production	Thomas Newman	Won
2004	BMI Film & TV Awards	BMI Film Music Award	Thomas Newman	Won
2004	Motion Picture Sound Editors	Best Sound Editing in Animated Feature – Music	Bill Bernstein	Won
2004	Satellite Awards	Best Original Score	Thomas Newman	Nominated
2004	Saturn Awards	Best Music	Thomas Newman	Nominated

== Personnel ==
Credits adapted from CD liner notes.

- Original score composed and conducted by Thomas Newman
- Produced by Bill Bernstein and Thomas Newman
- Recorded by Tommy Vicari and Dennis Sands at The Village and Signet Recording Studios
- Orchestra recorded by Armin Steiner at the Sony Scoring Stage
- Orchestrated by Thomas Pasatieri
- Concertmaster: Sid Page
- Orchestra contractor: Leslie Morris
- Assistant engineer: Okhee Kim and Tom Hardisty
- Mixed by: Tommy Vicari
- Mastered by: Joe Gastwirt
- Music editor: Bill Bernstein
- Assistant music editor: Michael Zainer
- Technician: Jesse Voccia
- Music supervisor: Tom MacDougall
- Music co-ordinator: Deniece LaRocca-Hall
- Music preparation: Julian Bratolyubov
- Music production assistants: Jill Iverson and Joel Berke
- Production manager: Andrew Page
- Executive producer: Chris Montan
- Art direction: Luis M. Fernández
- Design: Marcella Wong and Tiffany Quon
- Liner notes: Andrew Stanton

Instruments

- Brass and clarinet: Steve Tavaglione
- Electric piano and organ: John Beasley
- Flute: Steve Kujala
- Processed flute and clarinet: George Budd
- French horn: Brian O'Connor, Daniel P. Kelley, David Duke, Joe Meyer, John A. Reynolds, Kurt Snyder, Mark Adams, Phil Yao, Steve Becknell and Todd Miller
- Lap steel guitar: Chas Smith
- Piano: Thomas Newman and John Beasley
- Synthesizer: Rick Cox
- Percussion: Michael Fisher and Peter Engelhart
- Trombone: Booth, Bill Reichenbach, Bruce Otto, Charles Loper, George Thatcher, Phil Teele and Steven Holtman
- Trumpet: Chris Tedesco, Dan Savant, Gary Grant, Jeff Bunnell, Jon Lewis, Malcolm McNab, Rick Baptist and Wayne Bergeron
- Tuba: Jim Self
- Ukulele Banjo, bajo sexto, lyre, dulcimer and electric guitar: George Doering
