= Disney Stars on Parade =

Parade in Disneyland Park (Paris)

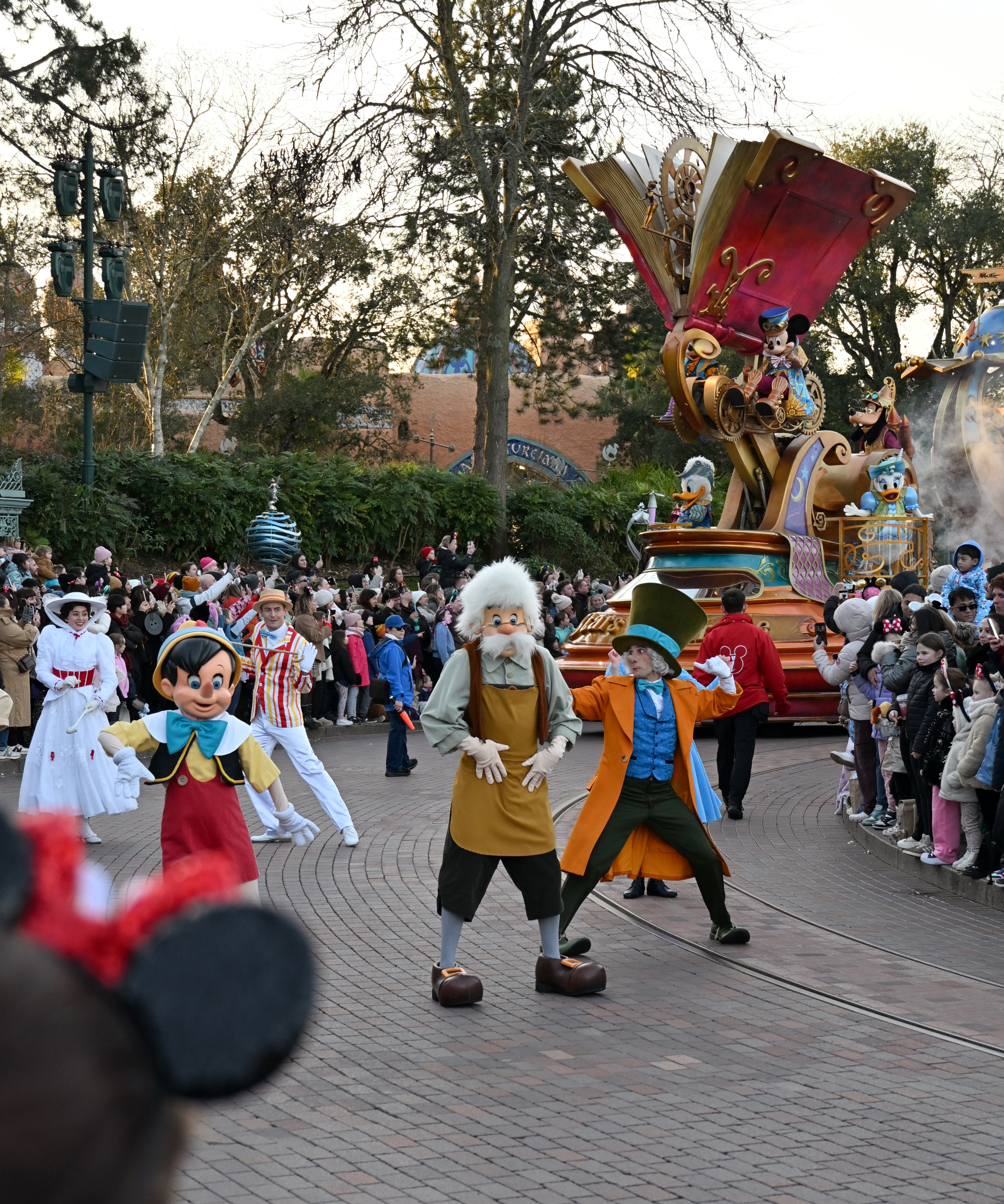
- Pinocchio characters at the Disney Stars on Parade at Disneyland Paris.

Disneyland Park (Paris)
- Status: Operating
- Soft opening date: 25 March 2017
- Opening date: 26 March 2017
- Replaced: Disney Magic on Parade

Ride statistics
- Attraction type: Parade
- Designer: Olivier Dusautoir and Jody Daily
- Theme: Discovery
- Duration: 25 minutes
- Wheelchair accessible

Disney Stars on Parade is the current parade in Disneyland Park at Disneyland Paris. The parade premiered on 26 March 2017, as part of the park's 25th anniversary celebration. The parade celebrates the discovery of the lands of imagination, represented by various Disney and Pixar films, such as Toy Story, The Jungle Book, The Lion King, Peter Pan, Finding Nemo, Sleeping Beauty, and Frozen.

== Background ==
This parade replaced Disney Magic on Parade! which ran from 1 April 2012 (the park's 20th anniversary) until 24 March 2017.

The parade is directed by Emmanuel Lenormand and designed by Olivier Dusautoir and Jody Daily. Daily previously worked on the Happiness is Here! parade at Tokyo Disneyland and Mickey's Soundsational Parade in Disneyland.

== Parade units and characters ==
- Discover the Magic: The opening unit features Mickey, Minnie, Donald, Daisy, Chip 'n' Dale, and Pluto wearing retrofuturistic steampunk costumes. Tinker Bell is seen on top of unit escaping from the pages of an enormous storybook. Dancing in front of the unit are Mary Poppins and Bert from Mary Poppins, Alice and the Mad Hatter from Alice in Wonderland, Aladdin and the Genie from Aladdin, Tigger from Winnie the Pooh, and Pinocchio from Pinocchio.
- Discover Friendship (Toy Story Unit): Buzz Lightyear sits atop a toy rocket and is pulling a red trolley filled with Andy's toys including Sheriff Woody riding Slinky Dog and several Little Green Men. Dancers wearing cowboy and army men costumes lead the unit.
- Discover Adventure (The Lion King and The Jungle Book Unit): In front of the unit, Young Simba is standing on Pride Rock with Rafiki and Zazu, as well as a live-action Timon and King Louie. At the rear of the unit, Mowgli can be seen sitting on a branch, while Baloo is seen sleeping on a hammock formed by Kaa. This unit was originally used in Tokyo Disneyland's former daytime parade Jubilation! and was slightly redressed for this parade.
- Discover Imagination (Peter Pan Unit): Captain Hook is sitting on top of Skull Rock, with Mr. Smee sitting below him. Behind Captain Hook and Mr. Smee is Peter Pan at the helm of a flying ship along with some of the Lost Boys. Wendy Darling and some of the Lost Boys can be seen dancing in front of the unit. This unit was originally used in Tokyo Disneyland's former daytime parade Jubilation!.
- Discover A New World (Finding Nemo Unit): A massive Crush swims above a coral reef with young sea turtles, while Bloat, Jenny, and Charlie swims above a diver's helmet that has Pearl and Sheldon inside. Before the unit, Nemo, Dory, and Marlin swim around some dancers dressed as coral.
- Discover Enchantment (Sleeping Beauty Unit): A giant steampunk fire-breathing dragon (Maleficent) follows Prince Phillip in hot pursuit. Several dancers on arm stilts dressed as brambles attempt to stop Prince Phillip from defeating Maleficent once and for all. The dragon unit is a replica of the one used in Magic Kingdom's current daytime parade Festival of Fantasy Parade at Walt Disney World.
- Discover Romance (Princesses Unit): The fairy godmothers Flora, Fauna and Merryweather leads the unit. A garden pavilion filled with oversized flowers houses a princess celebration, with princesses Aurora (Sleeping Beauty), Cinderella (Cinderella), Tiana (The Princess and the Frog), Ariel (The Little Mermaid), Belle (Beauty and the Beast), Rapunzel (Tangled), Snow White (Snow White and the Seven Dwarfs), Jasmine (Aladdin), and Merida (Brave) dancing inside.
  - When the parade opened in 2017, the princesses were paired with their respective princes and were either riding a horse-drawn carriage or dancing on foot. Merida and Jasmine were also not included in the initial princess line-up.
- Discover Wonder (Frozen Unit): Kristoff leads the finale unit and is dancing alongside several snowflakes. In front of the unit is Olaf is sitting on a rocking horse version of Sven, while Elsa and Anna stands on the balcony of the toy ice palace.

== Parade music ==
- Theme song: Lost in the Magic (music by Mark Hammond and lyrics by Carolyn Gardner; performed by Hollyn Miller and Manu Vince)
- Other songs featured:
  - Opening unit
    - "Lost in the Magic" | "A Whole New World"
  - Toy Story unit
    - "You've Got a Friend in Me"
  - Lion King/Jungle Book unit
    - "I Just Can't Wait to Be King" / "The Bare Necessities" / "I Wan'na Be Like You (The Monkey Song)"
  - Peter Pan unit
    - "You Can Fly!" / "Following the Leader" / "The Second Star to the Right" / "A Pirate's Life"
  - Finding Nemo unit
    - "Beyond the Sea"
  - Sleeping Beauty unit
    - '"Battle with the Forces of Evil" / "Hail to the Princess Aurora"
  - Princesses unit
    - "Someday My Prince Will Come" / "I See the Light" / "A Dream Is a Wish Your Heart Makes"
  - Frozen unit
    - "For the First Time in Forever" / "Let It Go"
