= Cool-A-Coo =

Defunct ice cream sandwich product

Cool-A-Coo was a vanilla ice cream sandwich made with oatmeal cookies and dipped in chocolate. It was a specialty in the Los Angeles area for over 25 years and was made fresh in Southern California. It was the original ice cream sandwich of the Los Angeles Dodgers. As of August 2016, it has been discontinued and is no longer available.

== History ==
Leo Politis, the original maker of Cool-A-Coo in El Monte, California, along with 30 employees, made 3 million Cool-A-Coos a year to keep up with an average of 4,000 Cool-A-Coos being consumed per game at Dodger Stadium before the early 1990s.

Although it is the original ice cream sandwich of the Dodgers, Cool-A-Coo disappeared from Dodger stadium in 1998 when Peter O'Malley sold the Dodgers to News Corp. Due to thousands of requests through a suggestion box put out by Stan Kasten, CEO of the Dodgers, Cool-A-Coo made its comeback to the stadium in 2012.

After being removed from sale at Dodgers Stadium, Leo Politis sold his company and the Cool-A-Coo trademark to Sweet Novelty Inc which ceased production of the dessert. In order to bring Cool-A-Coo back, the Dodgers negotiated a contract with Sweet Novelty to produce Cool-A-Coo and revisited deals with existing ice cream vendors in order to compete with a new concession stand vendor. Levy Restaurants, the Dodger Stadium concessionaire's new recipe leaves all of the basics unchanged from the original.

As part of development of the new recipe, a few prototypes were created and tasted by Dodgers Stadium employees that had eaten the original Cool-A-Coo. In their opinion, the prototypes — with less sweet and more dense vanilla ice cream — did not taste like the original Cool-A-Coo. The perfection of the new recipe also required a missing ingredient in the oatmeal cookies in the form of cinnamon.

In 2016, the Cool-A-Coo was discontinued and is no longer being manufactured or sold.
