= Cresco Labs =

American cannabis company

Cresco Labs, Inc.
- Company type: Public
- Traded as: CSE: CL; OTCQX: CRLBF
- Industry: Cannabis industry, medical marijuana
- Founded: 2013
- Founder: Charlie Bachtell; Joe Caltabiano
- Headquarters: Chicago, IL
- Area served: Arizona; California; Illinois; Massachusetts; Michigan; New York; Nevada; Ohio; Pennsylvania; Florida
- Key people: Charlie Bachtell (CEO); Tom Manning (chairman)
- Brands: Cresco; Reserve; Remedi; Mindy's; High Supply; Good News; FloraCal
- Revenue: US$724,343,000 (2024)
- Net income: US$364,454,000 (2024)
- Total assets: US$1,355,355,000 (2024)
- Number of employees: 2900 (2024)
- Website: https://www.crescolabs.com/

Cresco Labs, Inc. is a publicly traded, vertically integrated cannabis and medical marijuana company based in Chicago, Illinois, with current retail operations in nine states where marijuana has been legalized for medical use. The company's stock trades on the Canadian Securities Exchange under the ticker symbol CL, and in over-the-counter markets in the United States with the ticker symbol CRLBF.

== History ==
Cresco Labs was founded in 2013 by Charlie Bachtell, who currently serves as CEO, and Joe Caltabiano, who served as president until resigning on March 2, 2020. The co-founders met in 2007 while working together at Guaranteed Rate, a mortgage company based in Chicago. Despite founding Cresco in 2013, Bachtell continued working at Guaranteed Rate as its general counsel until 2015; Caltabiano remained with Guaranteed Rate as a vice president until 2017, and did not begin working full-time at Cresco until after a stint with BeMortgage.

Bachtell, who earned a Juris Doctor in 2003 at DePaul University College of Law, wrote a 25-page business plan within 72 hours of Illinois’ 2013 passage of its medical marijuana law on the suggestion of Caltabiano, a childhood leukemia survivor who maintained an active interest in cancer care and philanthropy. The company was initially formed with $3.5 million from the two co-founders and three of their friends, with 6% of the company's initial equity given to Denver Relief Consulting as a fee for establishing operational know-how and infrastructure. Cresco's initial retail locations, all in Illinois, were licensed for Joliet, Kankakee, and Lincoln, and were operational by the end of 2015. The company operated cultivation facilities beginning in November 2015, with its first retail cannabis sales occurring in January 2016.

At the start of 2018, Cresco employed roughly 100 people. By the end of the third quarter of 2018, the company had 300 employees in six states.

On October 5, 2018, Cresco raised $100 million in private investment capital. At the time, it operated three cultivation facilities in Illinois and employed roughly 300 people, about half of whom were based in Illinois.

On October 9, 2018, Cresco announced its intention to go public on the Canadian Securities Exchange (CSE) via a reverse takeover with Randsburg International Gold Corp. At the time of the announcement, Cresco was licensed to operate in Pennsylvania, Ohio, Arizona, Nevada, and California as well as Illinois. It was the second Illinois-based cannabis company to go public on the CSE in 2018, after Green Thumb Industries. Cresco began trading on the CSE on December 3, 2018, raising $87 million; at this point, it had raised $205 million over the course of 2018.

At the end of 2018, Cresco employed roughly 500 people. On December 20, 2018, Cresco announced the acquisition of two dispensaries in Illinois, which brought the company to the state-mandated limit of five.

On June 1, 2019, Illinois became the 11th state to allow recreational use of marijuana; on June 3, Cresco CEO Bachtell announced plans to double the company's employee headcount from 300 to 600 by the start of 2020 to meet recreational demand, which he estimated would initially be "four to eight times" the size of the medicinal cannabis market, with the potential to become "10 to 20" times as large as Illinois’ medicinal market, which was reported to be roughly $130 million at the time of the law's passage. On CNBC’s Fast Money, Bachtell noted that Illinois would progress from a market with 70,000 medicinal marijuana patients to one with "13 million people [and] over 100 million tourists a year." Since legalization, Cresco Labs has opened several dispensaries under the Sunnyside label in Illinois communities that border states where marijuana remains illegal; there are currently Sunnyside dispensaries in Danville, Illinois (bordering Indiana) and South Beloit, Illinois (bordering Wisconsin).

In March 2020, Cresco Labs President Joe Caltabiano announced his departure from the firm.

In July 2023, Cresco Labs sued fellow Chicago based cannabis company Green Thumb Industries for poaching employees. The lawsuit alleged that Matt Ingram, Greem Thumb's senior vice president of operations, had been reaching out to recruit Cresco employees, despite knowledge of their 12-month non-compete clause. Christopher Tonge, former director of technical services at Cresco Labs, had been one of those employees who was recruited by Ingram, allegedly breaking his non-compete contract.

=== Acquisitions ===
On March 18, 2019, Cresco announced the $120 million acquisition of VidaCann, a Florida medical marijuana company with seven active retail locations and the potential to hold up to 30 total licenses for cultivation, manufacturing, and retail facilities in Florida.

On April 1, 2019, Cresco announced an $850 million acquisition of Canada-based Origin House, heralded at the time as "the largest public company acquisition in the history of the U.S. cannabis industry". The deal, denominated at $1.1 billion Canadian dollars, was undertaken to increase Cresco's presence in California, in which Origin House products were already sold through more than 500 dispensaries. The deal was not completed until January 9, 2020, because the two companies received requests for information from the U.S. Department of Justice's Antitrust Division in June 2019. On Jan 14, 2021, Cresco entered into a definitive agreement to acquire Bluma Wellness (CSE: BWEL.U) (OTCQX:BMWLF), a Florida licensee, in an all-share transaction valued at $213 million.

In October 2021, Cresco Labs announced the acquisition of Pennsylvania operator, Laurel Harvest, for $80 million. The transaction was expected to close in the 4th quarter of 2021.

In March 2022, Cresco Labs announced the acquisition of New York-based cannabis firm, Columbia Care, for $2 billion in an all-stock transaction. Following this acquisition, Cresco would have had the second-largest retail footprint in the industry after Trulieve. This deal didn't go through in the end, due to a failure to divest assets to comply with government regulation.

== Marketing and branding ==
Cresco hired marketing executives including Cory Rothschild, Gatorade's former director of consumer engagement; Cris Rivera, former senior director of marketing at MillerCoors; and Scott Wilson, a former global creative director at Nike who was named Cresco's chief experience officer in November 2018.

In February 2019, Cresco announced the creation of a subsidiary and new brand called Well Beings, which will offer versions of Cresco's other products containing only cannabidiol (CBD).

In late July 2019, Cresco announced plans to rebrand its 56 active dispensaries under the "Sunnyside" brand, in an effort to make the shopping experience more akin to that of other major retail brands located in prime shopping districts. Sunnyside will be oriented around a wellness theme, to replace and consolidate the 11 brands currently used by Cresco's retail locations.

== See also ==
- Medical cannabis in the United States
