= Green Thumb Industries =

American cannabis company

- The company's logo
- Trade name: Green Thumb Industries Inc
- Company type: Public
- Traded as: OTCQX: GTBIF; CSE: GTII
- Industry: Cannabis
- Founded: 2014, in Chicago, United States
- Founder: Ben Kovler
- Headquarters: 325 West Huron Street, Chicago, Illinois, United States
- Number of locations: 20 manufacturing facilities; 101 retail locations; (2024)
- Revenue: US$1,100,000,000 (2024)
- Net income: US$601,100,000 (2024)
- Number of employees: 4800 (2024)
- Website: gtigrows.com

Green Thumb Industries (GTI) is a cannabis company in the United States, with its headquarters in Chicago, Illinois.

== History ==
Green Thumb Industries was founded in 2014 by Ben Kovler. The company started with one dispensary in Mundelein, Illinois. Early investors in Green Thumb include: Leon Cooperman; Emily Paxhia; Ari Levy, of Levy Restaurants; and Peter Kadens, who served as CEO until 2018.

In June 2018, Green Thumb was listed on the Canadian Securities Exchange with the trading symbol GTII. At the time, Green Thumb had 350 employees across seven manufacturing facilities and 50 retail stores in seven states. By the end of the first day, the stock price closed at CA$8.95, up 74 cents from opening. The Canadian Securities Exchange had become a natural home for American cannabis industry companies like Green Thumb due to marijuana's federally illegal status in the United States.

In March 2021, Green Thumb was put under federal investigation for possible "pay-to-play" violations. Green Thumb had hired lobbyists and consultants and donated to pro-cannabis PACs throughout the company's existence.

In August 2021, Green Thumb bought 38 acres (15 ha) of land in Warwick, New York, for the construction of a cannabis cultivation and processing plant. The land is on the former site of the Mid-Orange Correctional Facility and now forms a new business park. Fellow cannabis industry companies urbanXtracts, PharmaCann, and Citiva Medical also have a presence nearby. A groundbreaking ceremony was held on September 9th.

In July 2023, Green Thumb was sued by fellow Chicago based cannabis company Cresco Labs for poaching employees. The lawsuit alleged that Matt Ingram, Green Thumb's senior vice president of operations, had been reaching out to recruit Cresco employees, despite knowledge of their 12-month non-compete clause. Christopher Tonge, former director of technical services at Cresco Labs, had been one of those employees who was recruited by Ingram, allegedly breaking his non-compete contract.

In November 2023, Green Thumb's incredibles brand partnered with Magnolia Bakery to produce a new limited range of cannabis edibles. In January 2025, Green Thumb Industries and Chicago music venue The Salt Shed announced a two-year partnership to sell THC products on-site, including RYTHM branded marijuana, incredibles branded gummies and chocolates, Beboe branded gummies, and Señorita branded THC margaritas.

== Brands ==
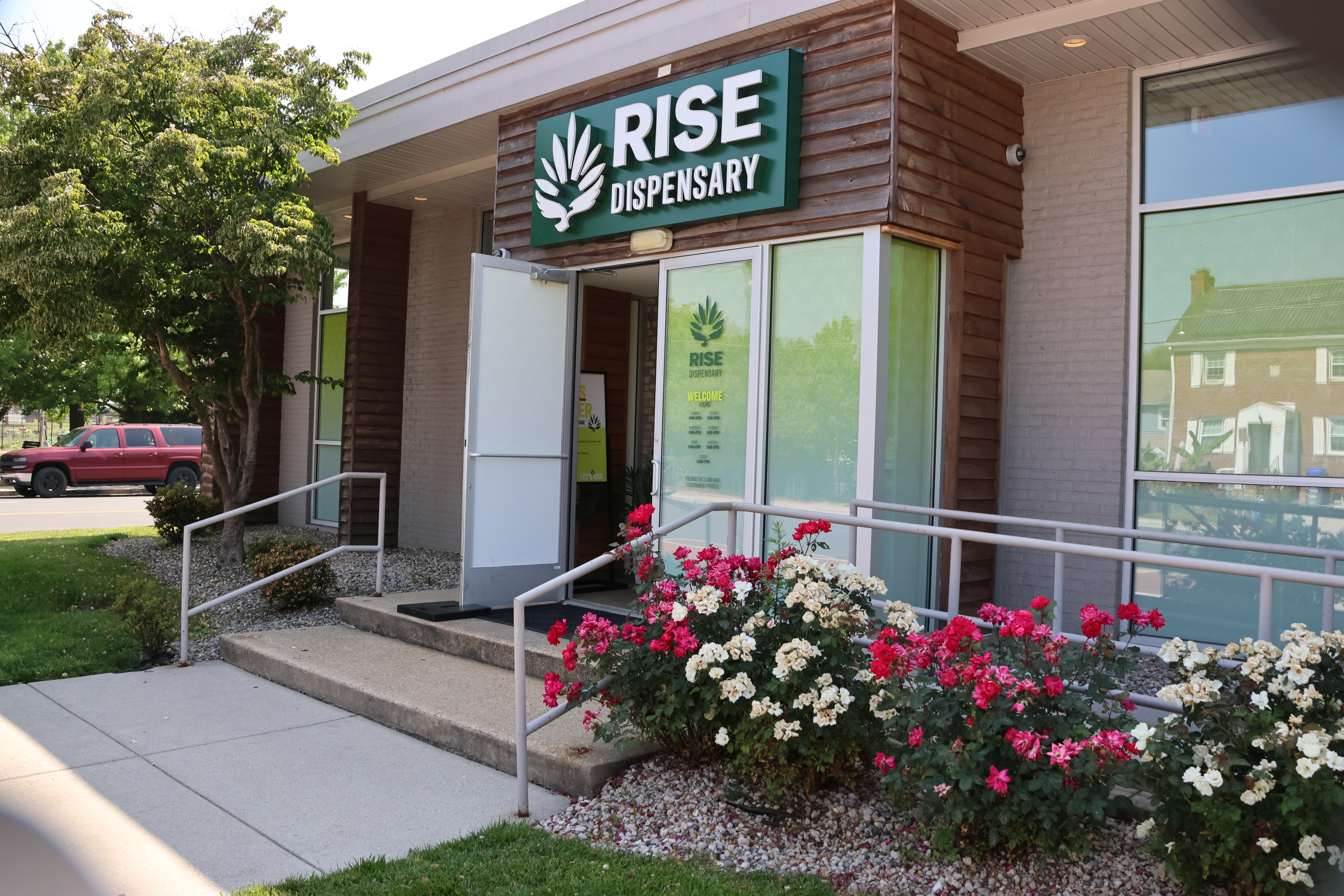
RISE dispensary in Silver Spring, Maryland

Green Thumb Industries has a number of different brands under which is produces and distributes cannabis products, including: RYTHM, Dogwalkers, incredibles, Beboe, Good Green, Doctor Solomon's, and Shine. Doctor Solomon's topped a 2023 Chicago Reader poll for best topical cannabinoid. RISE is GTI's brand of dispensaries which has locations across 14 states. On November 23 2024, the 100th RISE dispensary was opened in Carson City, Nevada.

== See also ==
- List of largest cannabis companies by revenue
