= Wildhorse Saloon =

Club in Nashville, Tennessee

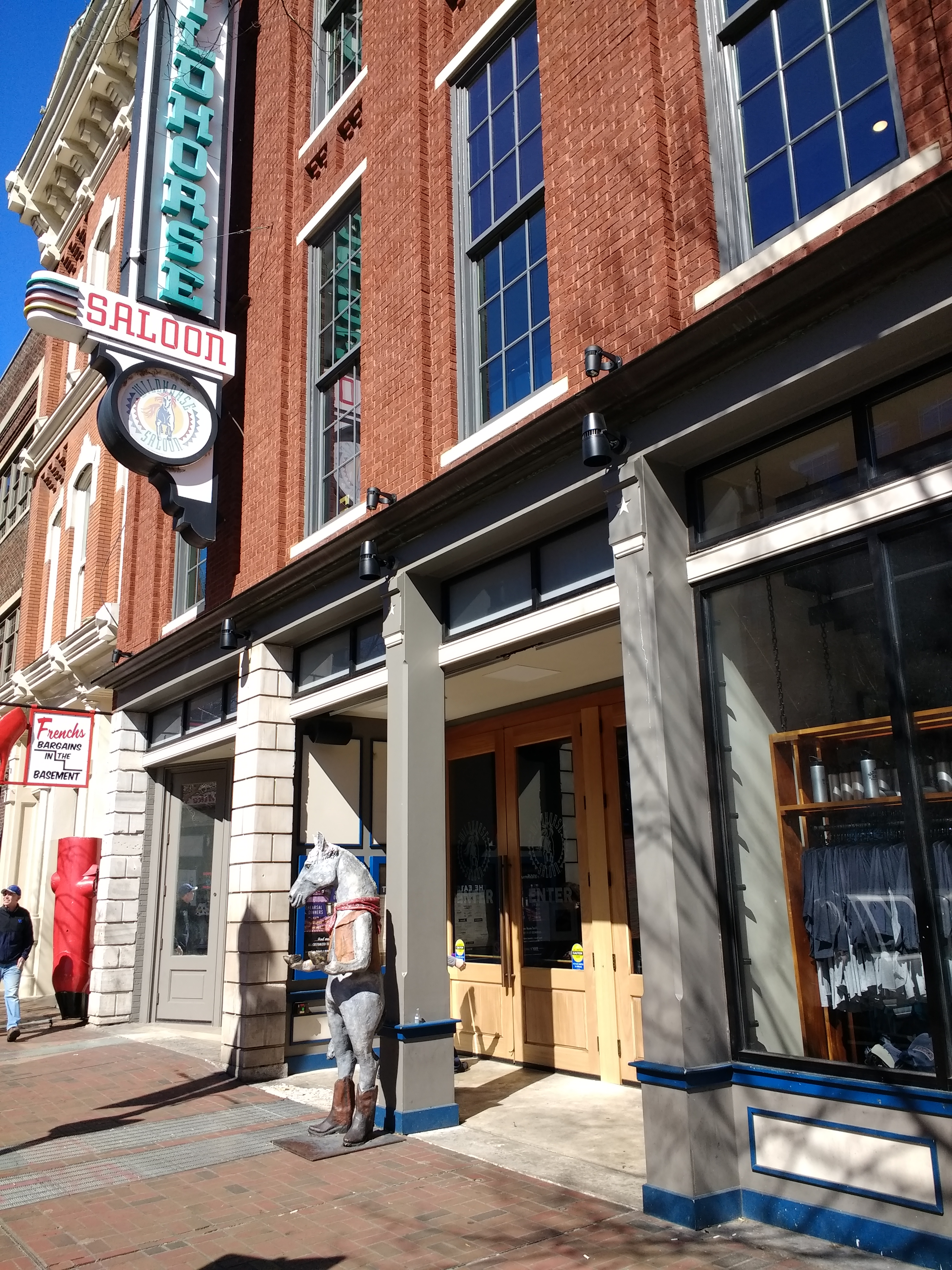
- Interactive map of Wildhorse Saloon
- Location: 120 2nd Ave N Nashville, Tennessee 37201
- Coordinates: 36°9′45.4″N 86°46′31.6″W
- Owner: Ryman Hospitality Properties
- Seating type: Standing Room, Reserved
- Capacity: 2,000
- Type: Night club
- Event: Various

Construction
- Opened: June 1, 1994

Website
- Official Site

The Wildhorse Saloon was a country and western-themed restaurant which offers live music in addition to a dance club in downtown Nashville, Tennessee. It is owned by Opry Entertainment Group, a subsidiary of Ryman Hospitality Properties (formerly known as Gaylord Entertainment Company).

The Wildhorse Saloon first opened on June 1, 1994, in a converted warehouse, centered around line dancing. It operated for three decades as a bar and dance club with a three-level live concert venue for all genres of music. It was also used as a banquet hall.

On April 13, 2023, it was announced that the Wildhorse Saloon would be replaced by a concert hall and honky-tonk inspired by Luke Combs's song "Hurricane" with building updates expected to be completed by mid-2024. In January 2024, the Wildhorse Saloon officially closed its doors in preparation for the upcoming changes to the venue. It is expected to reopen in phases, beginning in late 2024, under the new name Category 10.

== Media ==
The Wildhorse Saloon previously housed a full-service radio studio, formerly used by WSM-FM when the station was under Gaylord ownership. It featured large windows and several sets of headphones hanging outside the studio, allowing anyone to watch and listen to what was happening inside. Rich Miller, host of Power Country with Rich Miller, once hosted a 7 p.m.–midnight live show in the studio, frequently featuring country singers and other celebrities. During this time, LoCash singer Chris Lucas was the house DJ. Chris and Rich co-hosted a singing contest called "Sing To Win." Nightly broadcasting from the studio ended when a lightning strike took out the main console. The room was later converted into a small video arcade and was removed completely in 2016. The venue formerly hosted the Wildhorse Saloon Dance Show on The Nashville Network hosted by Katie Haas in the mid-1990s. It also served as an audition site for the second season of American Idol. More recently, it has served as home of the Idol spin-off Can You Duet on CMT.

== Wildhorse Saloon at Walt Disney World ==
A second Wildhorse Saloon opened at Pleasure Island at the Walt Disney World Resort in Lake Buena Vista, Florida, replacing the Fireworks Factory restaurant. It operated as a joint venture of Gaylord Entertainment and Levy Restaurants from 1998 to 2001. Gaylord and Levy sold their interests in the building to Disney in 2001, which replaced it with a top 40 dance club called Motion. Motion closed alongside the rest of Pleasure Island in September 2008, and its building was demolished in late 2010.
