= Disney Smellitizer =

Disney Smellitizers are devices strategically hidden around Disney parks that dispense formulated aromas specific to their locations. Different scents, each meticulously designed and selected by Imagineers, are dispersed in different areas and rides in Disney parks. These scents create lasting impressions in the subconscious minds of visitors. The Smellitizers influence parkgoers' experience by triggering olfactory-based nostalgia. The Walt Disney Company has never officially confirmed the existence of these devices to the public. All confirmation and explanations of the Smellitizers are from former Imagineers and from the company's patents for aroma-dispensing devices. The first patent for Disney Smellitizers was signed in the 1980s.

== Function at Disney ==
Disney Smellitizers are devices hidden strategically around Disney parks that blow artificial aromas at precise times in carefully determined amounts. The devices are often concealed by or embedded in ventilation grates, facades, and ride vehicles. Disney has never officially announced the existence of the Smellitizers, but their existence and usage is undeniably factual. All information comes from retired Imagineers and patents received by the Disney Company. The Smellitizers release scents via airflow in regulated amounts at certain times during a ride or performance. It is likely that the scented substances are converted from liquids and solids into gases. Exhaust vents then clear the aromas by sucking them back up after dispensing it. Newer Smellitizer models have advanced to the point of being capable of dispensing multiple scents at once, blending aromas, dispensing scents in quantities directly based on the number of guests, and pumping out aromas gradually as opposed to in bursts.

=== Purpose ===
Smellitzers dispense aromas to further immerse guests in the Disney experience. Disney Smellitizers also have the secondary purpose of favorably associating Disney park memories with certain scents.

=== Impact on parkgoers' experience ===
The effect of dispensing the aromas cultivated by Disney Imagineers has always resulted in visitors generally lingering for longer periods of time and leaving higher ratings. Olfactory senses are heavily connected to memory and can be used to trigger strong feelings of nostalgia in returning parkgoers.

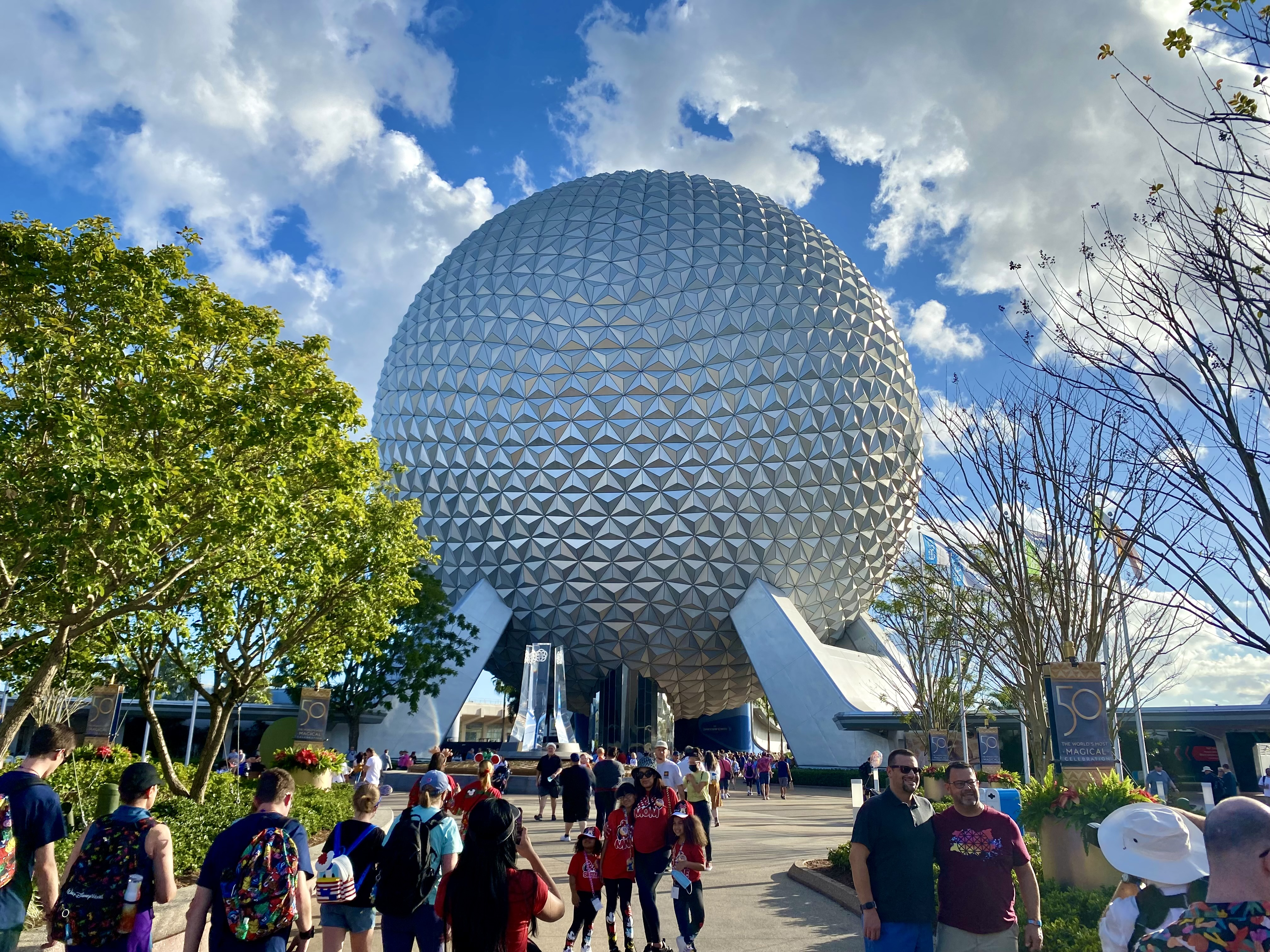

=== History ===
Disney's scent-related program started in the opening of the EPCOT Center in 1982. Imagineer Bob McCarthy had created a "scent cannon," which would launch an aroma across the track of a ride when triggered by a vehicle. A patent for an aroma-emitting system was granted to the Walt Disney Company in 1986. The use of the Smellitizers in rides had been implemented by the 1990s. In 2019, another patent was granted for upgraded Smellitizers capable of pumping out aromas gradually, releasing multiple scents at a time, and blending smells together.

=== Scents used ===
Over 4,000 aroma compounds, developed in Grasse, France, are utilized by the Smellitizer system. Disney Imagineers have experimented with over 3,000 different aromas from which they have selected the ones used now. The scent of oranges is used in the ride Soarin' Around the World when "flying" over California. Aromas invoking thoughts of cedar beam and dusty attic doors are used for Haunted Mansion. A smokey scent is used as Rome burns on Spaceship Earth. In Main Street, U.S.A., hidden Smellitizers dispense the scents of baked goods and vanilla. Each Disney resort has its own signature fragrance. For Soarin’, Imagineers recreated the aroma of a pair of new socks soaked in ocean water and used that as the "sea breeze scent" that is dispensed at a point during the ride. Soarin' also has aromas like grass and roses. A now-shut-down attraction called It's Tough to be a Bug was well known for the "stink bug scent." The real scent of a stink bug was considered, but ultimately deemed too strong. Another earthy scent, selected by Joe Rohde, was used in its place.
