= Trulieve =

U.S. cannabis dispensary operator

Trulieve Cannabis Corp.
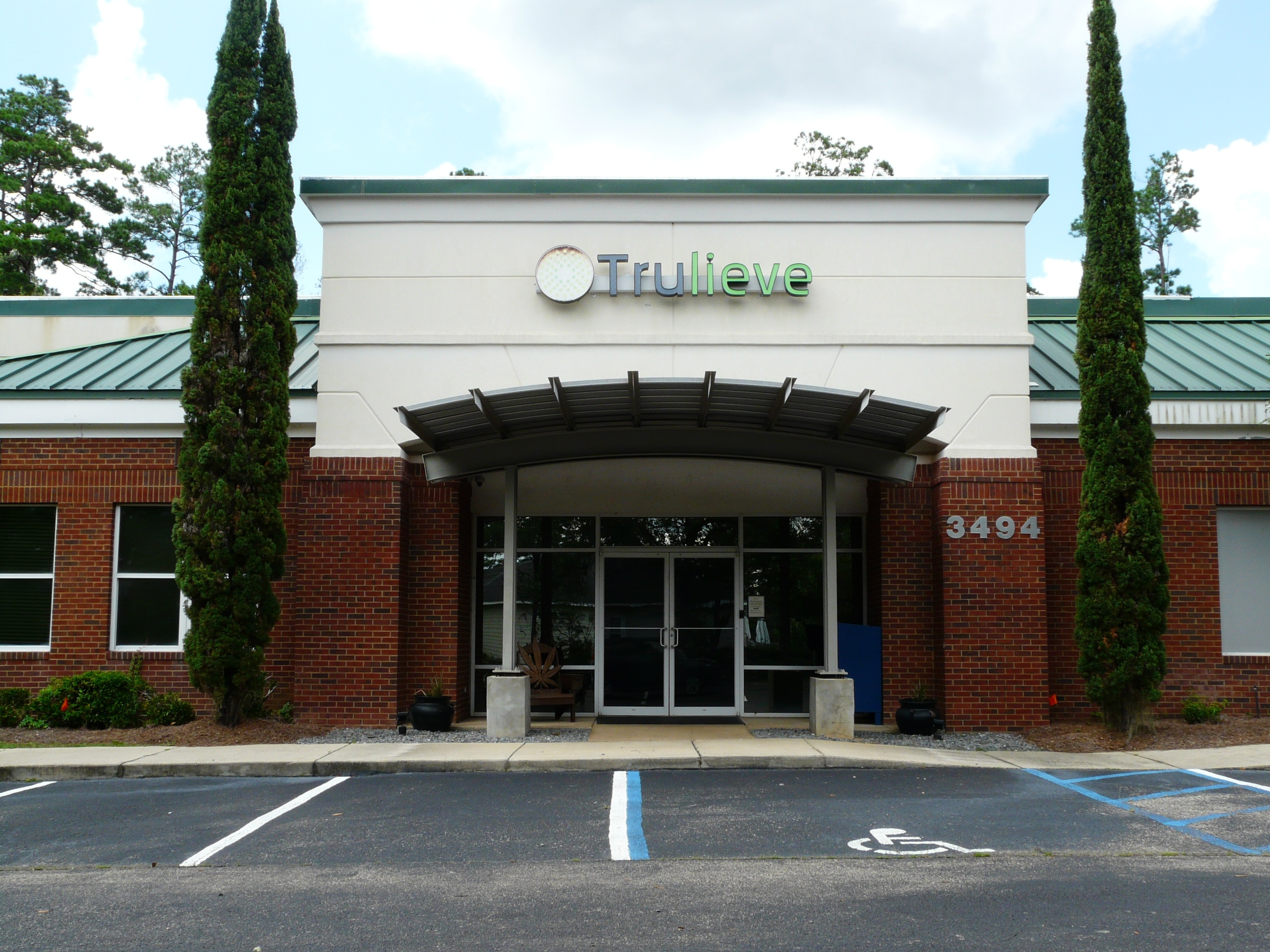
- Trulieve headquarters in Tallahassee, Florida
- Industry: Cannabis industry
- Products: Cannabis
- Revenue: US$1.2 billion (2022)
- Website: trulieve.com

Trulieve is a business in the U.S. cannabis industry. It is considered the second largest in the segment, behind Curaleaf, with $1.2 billion in 2022 sales. In 2021, after acquiring Canadian company Harvest, Trulieve became at the time the largest cannabis company in the world, and claimed to be the most profitable.

The parent company, Trulieve Cannabis Corp., trades in the Canadian Securities Exchange (CSE: TRUL).

== See also ==
- List of cannabis companies
- List of largest cannabis companies by revenue
