= Organigram Inc. =

Canadian cannabis company

Organigram Global Inc.
- Organigram logo
- Traded as: Nasdaq: OGI; TSX: OGI
- Industry: Cannabis
- Headquarters: 1400-145 King Street West, Toronto, Canada
- Revenue: US$247,177,000 (2024)
- Number of employees: 875 (2024)
- Website: organigram.ca

Organigram Global Inc. is a cannabis company. The business has a facility in Moncton.

== Business ==
Organigram is a Canadian company that produces and sells cannabis and cannabis-derived products, including dried flower, pre-rolls, vapes, concentrates, oils, and edibles, for both the adult-use and medical markets.

The company generates revenue through sales to provincial cannabis boards, direct sales to medical patients, and exports and partnerships in certain international markets.

== History ==
On March 24th, 2025, Organigram investors approved rebranding from Organigram Holdings to Organigram Global.

In 2023, the company reported a quarterly profit of $5.3 million, reversing a $1.3 million loss a year earlier, as revenue rose to $43.3 million from $30.4 million and margins improved.

In November 2025, the company announced that James Yamanaka, a former executive at British American Tobacco, was being appointed CEO effective around January 15, 2026, and that he would also join the company’s board.

== See also ==
- List of largest cannabis companies by revenue
