= Adventurers Club =

Nightclub in Walt Disney World Resort

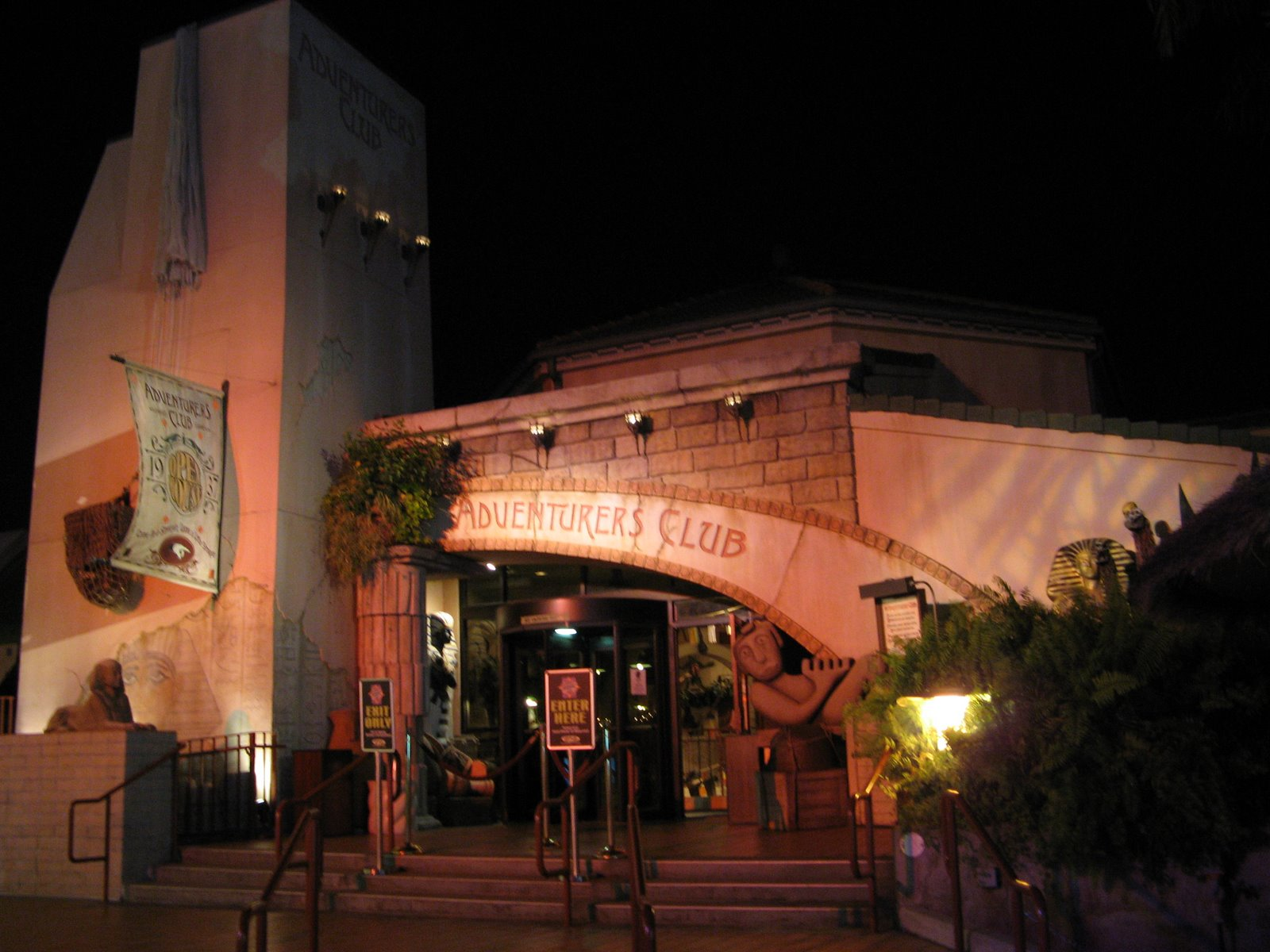
Adventurers' Club

The Adventurers' Club was a themed nightclub in Pleasure Island at the Walt Disney World Resort. It was styled after a private club for world travelers and explorers and was set in 1937. The walls of the club were covered with artifacts and photographs from various explorations. The Adventurers' Club featured animatronics, puppets, and a cast of adventurers who performed in shows and improvisational comedy while mingling with the club's patrons. Shows and conversation were often laced with innuendo, and the patrons might have been welcomed as guests, given fictitious names and "recognized" as fellow adventurers, or simply referred to as "drunks".

== History ==
The Adventurers' Club opened with the rest of Pleasure Island on May 1, 1989, as part of a fictional legend about the island's previous owner, Merriweather Adam Pleasure, and back-story describing each of the buildings' former uses. Disney's Imagineers, led by head writer, show producer, and show director Roger Cox, and designer Joe Rohde (who later designed Disney's Animal Kingdom theme park), conceived and created the club.

The Adventurers' Club's unlikely hero, Emil Bleehall, is based on a semi-autobiographical character Cox created. He is a little guy from Ohio who gains respect and admiration with his awkward but uniquely crowd-pleasing talents. Cox felt it paralleled his own story at Disney. A docudramatic version of Cox’s journey at Disney by Sandra Tsing Loh, called, "It Happened in Glendale", from her book Depth Takes a Holiday, was performed on an episode of the radio show This American Life titled "Something for Nothing."

Until December 31, 2005, every night in Pleasure Island was celebrated as New Year's Eve. The club's show schedule was set to create a break near midnight to allow people to go outside to see the fireworks and to accommodate the noisy explosions that resulted. One of the launch points for the nightly fireworks was the Adventurers' Club's rooftop.

On June 27, 2008 Disney announced the Adventurers' Club (along with all other clubs on Pleasure Island) would be closing permanently on September 27, 2008. An online petition to save the club was created at SaveTheAdventurers'Club.info by members of the Disney fan community in hopes that Disney would consider moving the club or keeping it open as part of the new Pleasure Island format. Over 2,750 signatures were collected in the first 72 hours. There were also letter-writing campaigns to company executives, web sites, and blog postings. In February 2009, Disney announced that Adventurers' Club and the dance clubs Motion and Soundstage would reopen for private party rentals at least through September, 2009.

On September 26, 2009, it was confirmed that props from the Club would be sent to Hong Kong Disneyland. The props were worked into the Mystic Manor attraction, which opened in 2013. A few props which were created by cast members for use in the shows have been sold at auction by the performers who owned them. There are rumors that several "artifacts" from the former Club made their way to Trader Sam's in the Disneyland Hotel. The face of Babylonia was relocated to Jock Lindsay’s Hangar Bar in the Disney Springs shopping mall in Florida. Some items have been internally offered for sale to cast members.

The last public performance was held September 27, 2008 to overflowing crowds. The last semi-public event held at the Club occurred on September 25, 2009. It was a convention party for The ConGaloosh Society, Inc, a Florida nonprofit organization dedicated to the preservation of interactive improvisational theatre. The ConGaloosh Society continues to hold events that bring together fans of the Adventurers' Club with cast members in new settings.

The Adventurers'' Club's cast reunited for one last performance and "membership renewal" at the Disney D23 Destination D event on November 23, 2014.

The Adventurers' Club cast reunited again for the Countdown to Midnight event at Disney's Yacht and Beach Club Resort on December 31, 2015, inducting new members for the first time in seven years.

On April 29, 2019, some of the Cast of the Adventurers' Club reunited to celebrate the 30th Anniversary of Pleasure Island, and new members were inducted into the Club at a special event on the beach at Disney's Beach Club Resort.

== Inspiration ==
The Adventurers' Club was designed and created by Walt Disney Imagineering in the late 1980s. Walt Disney Imagineering is the design and development arm of The Walt Disney Company, responsible for the creation and construction of Disney theme parks worldwide. Chris Carradine, the Vice President of Walt Disney Imagineering, played a significant role in the creation of the club.

The origins of the club were recently described by Craig McNair Wilson, who worked with the dramatic team for the club. According to Wilson, "it came out of our collective, shared love of the world of the pith helmet and all that circled around it. It was the place we always wanted to go, but it didn't exist."

Wilson said the idea originated from a Sunday afternoon theme party, given by Disney employee Joe Rohde. The theme of the party was "The Last Days of the Raj." Every year for years, the employees would dress up in theme costume to recreate the days of British colonialism.

According to Wilson, the Los Angeles show Tamara was also a "major influence on the team." Tamara was a live theatrical, multiroom play, which allowed 150 audience members to follow ten actors through an Italian Villa set in the late 1930s. It took place in an old Elks hall in Los Angeles. Carradine saw the show "three or four times together and a few times more with others."

According to Wilson, there was also "more than a pinch of Rick’s Cafe," from the film Casablanca.

There are several organizations that may have served as inspiration for the attraction. The Explorers Club was founded in New York in 1904. There is also an actual "Adventurers'' Club" which had chapters in New York, Chicago, Los Angeles, and Honolulu. The Adventurers'' Club of Los Angeles, which was incorporated in 1922, has been in continuous operation since its founding.

Additionally, another organization, called the Ends of the Earth Club, was created in 1903. Its members included Mark Twain, General John Pershing, Admiral Robert Peary, Gutzon Borglum (the sculptor of Mount Rushmore) and more than 100 other prominent businessmen and academics located, primarily, in the northeastern United States. However, there is no evidence that the Disney team was aware of the existence of any of these clubs.

The physical layout of the club was designed by Carradine, who is an architect by training. The building was made intentionally large, so that the club could be expanded with additional exhibits.

== Characters ==
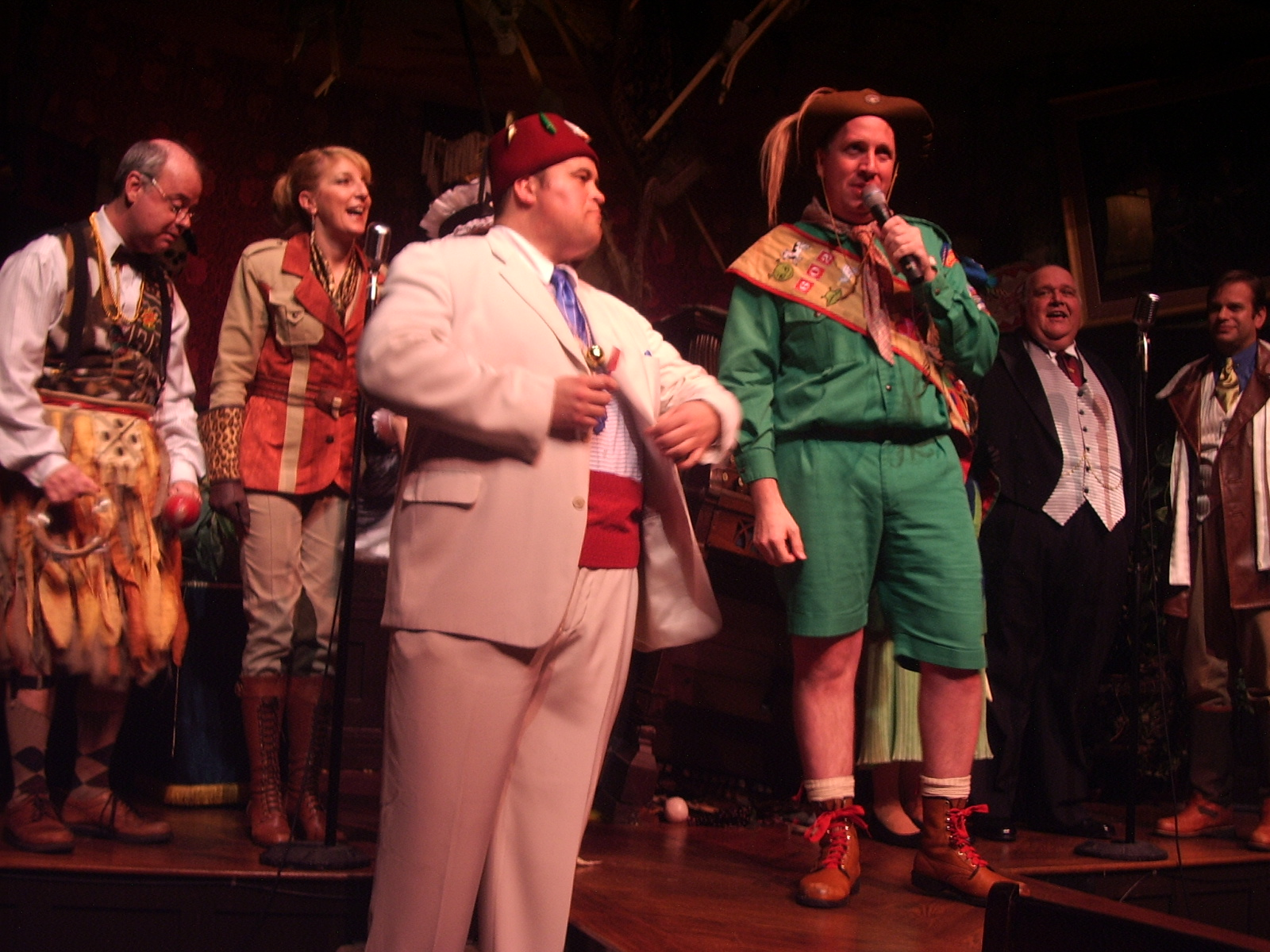
The Club Members celebrate the Hoopla

=== Resident adventurers ===
- Hathaway Browne – Aviator, and the club's resident innuendo-making ladies' man.
- Otis T. Wren – Club Treasurer and ichthyologist.
- Fletcher Hodges – Absent-minded Club Curator, he is said to have "mounted every object in the club."
- Pamelia Perkins – Club President. Paula Pell once portrayed her.
- Samantha Sterling – Explorer and cabaret singer.
- Emil Bleehall – Contender for the Balderdash Cup. Hails from Sandusky, Ohio. The character used to be portrayed as a plaid sport coat-wearing country bumpkin, but is now depicted as a "Junior Adventurer" in a costume that is a pastiche of a Boy Scout uniform. During the final performances, both characters appeared in the show (as Emil Sr. and Emil Jr.).
- Graves – Club Butler.
- The Maid – There were many maids who work in the Adventurers' Club and participate in its activities. The only character that changes identity depending on which actor is playing her.
- Madame Zarkov – A mysterious gypsy who makes rare appearances at the Club. This character usually replaces that of Samantha Sterling for an evening. Both Samantha Sterling and Madame Zarkov appeared in the final performances at the club.

Different actors portrayed the adventurers on different nights, and most actors played more than one part.

The maid is the only character in the club to have a unique identity when played by a different actress (by way of contrast, "Graves" is always known as "Graves" no matter which actor is playing him). Past and present maids include "Anelle", "Yvette", "Sugar Snap", "Beullah Belle", "Ginger Vitus", "Sunny Knight", "Kiki McGee", "Gabby Normal", "Tish Myash", "Dusty Cabinets", "Tallulah Buttertart", "LaRue", "Molly McClean", and more.

=== Other characters ===
- Colonel Critchlow Suchbench – Club Gleemeister. The colonel is a cable-controlled puppet working from behind the scenes. He is usually "on duty" (sitting dormant), but he wakes up to lead the new inductees in the club song, and occasionally to converse with guests in the Main Salon.
- Babylonia – A giant stone face on the wall in the Main Salon, the goddess of women and all things fertile, who sometimes speaks.
- The Yakoose – A mounted animal head that occasionally moves and speaks, either to guests or to Babylonia.
- Arnie and Claude – A pair of talking masks in the Mask Room.
- Beezle – A genie whose head appears in the Treasure Room.
- Fingers Zambezi – A haunted organ that provides the music for the Library shows (with animatronic motions that usually have little to do with the music, and timbres that morph from theatre organ to practically any other keyboard instrument, according to the needs of the show).
- Sutter Bestwick – Another normally unseen character who is supposed to be a competitor for the 1937 Balderdash Cup. He, too, is unable to attend due to Otis' exploits. Sutter is also a past winner of the Balderdash Cup for 1930. His only appearance was on the club's closing weekend.
- Chilton Thompson – Although mentioned in the Balderdash Cup and the Radio Broadcast, he is never seen. He is supposed to be the sound effects man for the Radio Broadcast. He is also a past competitor for the Balderdash Cup, but, due to Otis Wren's doing, is unable to attend for 1937.
- Sheila Griffin – An unseen character who is supposed to be playing the role of Greta in New Year's Eve episode of "Tales of the Adventurers' Club", but for some unknown reason, does not show up to the Radio Broadcast
- Marcel – An anthropoid member of the staff (played by an actor in an ape suit). Appeared during the early days of the club's existence, delivering mail and assisting the maid and club members. In the Hoopla of the club's closing night, he invited the permanent members of the Adventurers' Club to accompany him on a year-long safari.
- Plaid Monkey – This was a character invented by the performers in later years. He was sometimes joked about, but very rarely made appearances. The character was a quick combination of the Marcel monkey mask and plaid jacket props that were no longer in regular use.
- Nash – In the early years all bartenders were simply called Nash, no matter who was actually working that job at the time.
- Club Auctioneer – From time to time, guests were called to play different interactive roles. One more popular was the role of an auctioneer selling the services of the house maid. This guest became an infrequent visitor with around 30 estimated appearances in the late years of operation.
- Dave the Soundman – The name of the Tech of the day, no matter what the Tech's name actually is.

== Rooms ==
- The Zebra Mezzanine – The top floor of the club. The club entrance leads into the mezzanine, which forms a circular balcony around the Main Salon. The walls feature many artifacts, and a framed parchment of the Club Creed. Primarily Graves' domain, the adventurers spend limited time here except for certain rituals (e.g. an exorcism or the Rhythm Ritual). This area featured a rarely used extra bar near the staircase into the Main Salon that was only used during particularly busy nights.
- The Main Salon – The central room of the club. The Main Salon houses the nightclub's primary bar, and also has a small stage from which the adventurers often speak or lead shows such as the New Member Induction Ceremony. The centerpiece of the Main Salon is a larger-than-life statue that some say is titled "Zeus Goes Fishing", but alternatively referred to as "God with Rod". It is a replica of the famous Artemision Bronze. The walls of this room are filled with even more artifacts than on the Mezzanine, and many have placards giving their history and importance to the fictional former owner of the island, Merriweather Pleasure.
- The Mask Room – A small room off the Main Salon that features several shows throughout the night. The walls are covered with masks from around the world, many of which move and laugh. Two large Bacchanalian-inspired masks at the front of the room, Arnie and Claude, also talk and move their eyes.
- The Treasure Room – Another small room off the Main Salon, the Treasure Room contains additional artifacts gathered by the club, and also hosts several shows throughout the night which feature the genie-head-in-a-lantern special effect.
- The Library – This room is the largest in the club and hosts the larger (and mostly scripted) shows, many of which are musical in nature. This room also includes an additional bar, and is the home of Fingers Zambezi.

== Shows ==
The Adventurers' Club offered many shows throughout the night. The main shows were hosted in the library, which seated over 100 people, while smaller shows occurred in the Mask Room and Treasure Room, seating about 40 people each. The times were not always fixed, but there were plaques next to each room to show the schedule for that particular evening. The shows mostly follow a script and order of songs and jokes, but performers would sometimes make running jokes about guests' behavior, dress, or place of origin. Some guests would be invited to participate. Shows include:

- Welcome Party (Library). Samantha Sterling and Fletcher Hodges throw a welcome party to get the open house off to a good start.
- Radio Broadcast (Library). Otis and Pamelia lead a version of their weekly old-timey radio broadcast "Tales of the Adventurers' Club", in which half of the cast is missing and must be replaced by audience members. The broadcast is a serial radio show, similar to "The Shadow" or "Little Orphan Annie".
- The Balderdash Cup Competition (Library). The Adventurer of the Year wins the Balderdash Cup. The Balderdash Cup ceremony always ended with Emil Bleehall winning, as judged by crowd applause. However, on the club's final night, the crowd decided to applaud and cheer for Otis T. Wren, allowing him to win the cup for the fourth time.
- The RadioThon (Library). The club uses its radio broadcasting ability to attempt to raise $2,000 and save the club from losing its lease, finding some trouble along the way. A kind of variety show. On the last night, the show failed to raise the $2,000 needed.
- The New Member Induction Ceremony (Main Salon). Every night in the Adventurers' Club is the night of their membership drive. The ceremony is performed 3 times throughout the night, hosted by different characters each time.
  - The Club Salute – This is where new adventurers learn the true meaning of the club's greeting, "Kungaloosh!", and the secret salute to accompany it.
  - The Club Creed – A recitation of the Official Creed.
  - The Club Song – The Colonel is awakened to teach the crowd the club's anthem, though he usually misunderstands which song is expected of him at first.
- Samantha's Cabaret (Library) – Features Samantha Sterling performing musical numbers.
- The Maid's Sing-Along (Library). The Maid leads the audience in song.
- The Rhythm Ritual – A show centered in the Main Salon that leads into the Hoopla. The Ritual usually features all the adventurers looking down from the balconies of the mezzanine as they take turns performing humorous solos on percussive instruments. The ritual usually builds to a crescendo as they come downstairs into the Main Salon, all playing their instruments together. Then the Colonel responds to the sound by coming off duty and shouting out rhythmic but often nonsensical phrases for the patrons to repeat, finalizing in the announcement of the Hoopla.
- The Hoopla – The Adventurers' Club evening finale. At the end of the Rhythm Ritual, the Library doors open and the guests are seated. The Hoopla is hosted by Samantha Sterling, and always begins with a sing-along of "The Happy Wanderer". There are usually two or three other numbers performed by other adventurers, then the show is always concluded with Samantha leading everyone in "When the Saints Go Marching In", with each remaining adventurer creating a verse. The actors either invent a new verse on the spur of the moment or reuse one they've previously found to be effective.

Some shows were performed in the club's earlier years but later canceled. These include the beer tasting session (where guests would vote on the beer of the evening), "Fingers Plays Requests" (where guests would try to stump the organist's knowledge of tunes), Madam Zarkov's show, and more.

== Holidays ==
While every day is the Open House and the performers have free rein to alter the script to fit the evening, the club does do some specialty shows for the Halloween and Christmas seasons in place of one or more of the Library events.

- Halloween Jubilee – Pamelia presents her Halloween Spooktacular! Otis discovers Halloween Carols, and the gang battles an evil spirit they accidentally conjure when Emil points out the club charter requires a seance in the Halloween show. The Characters all wear costumes for this show – Pamelia the witch, Cowboy Otis, Vampire Hathaway, and Space Explorer Emil. Other characters will occasionally wear Halloween costumes for the season as well, including Pharaoh Fletcher Hodges, Leopard Samantha and Native American Graves.
- Holiday Broadcast – Pamelia tries to bring some Christmas spirit to the club, resulting in a seriously irritated Otis who abandons the show. Memorable moments include Hathaway singing "Home for the Holidays", the Maid performing "Santa Baby", Pamelia's song, "Pretty Little Dolly", and Emil and Pamelia telling the tale of "Dominick the Christmas Donkey." Otis returns to the show, making Pamelia's job easier because, after all, it is Christmas.
- Christmas Eve Reading – On Christmas Eve just before midnight, the characters would take turns reading passages from "Twas the Night Before Christmas". This was adopted because the club would close early due to the holiday, and there was no performance of the Rhythm Ritual or Hoopla that evening.
- Specialty Hooplas Themed Hooplas are not unusual in the least, with performers choosing to sing festive songs based on the Holiday seasons (Christmas, Valentine's Day, Halloween, or otherwise).

== Club traditions ==
During the Club's run, several unique traditions emerged. Some date back to the opening day of the club, others were added over the years.

- Kungaloosh – "Kungaloosh" is the Club's official greeting and its official beverage.
- Club Salute – The official means of recognition between members of the Adventurers' Club. It is a three-step process. First, place the heel of your right hand just above your navel and wiggle it like a swimming fish. Then, raise that hand to your mouth and take a drink from an imaginary glass of the properly chilled adult beverage of your choice. Finally, raise your hand above your head and declare "Kungaloosh!"
- Hoopla – The Bon-Voyage Hoopla was traditionally the final Library show of the night. Whenever one of the members of the Club were to mention the word "Hoopla" it was traditional to shout "Hoopla!" back at him or her.
- All-Purpose Theme Song – The Adventurers' Club All-Purpose Theme Song was sung at all major club functions, including all New-Member Induction Ceremonies and during the Club's radio broadcasts.

Marching along we're adventurers
Singing the song of adventurers
Up or down
North, south, east, or west,
An Adventurer's life is best. KUNGALOOSH!!

- The Club Creed

We climb the highest mountains,
just to get a better view.

We plumb the deepest oceans,
cause we're daring through and through.

We cross the scorching deserts,
martini in our hands.

We ski the polar ice caps,
in tuxedo looking grand.

We are reckless, brave, and loyal,
and valiant to the end.

If you come in here a stranger,
you will exit as a friend.

~Merriweather Adam Pleasure
Club Founder 1927

- The Club Motto – "Some days you eat the bear, some days the bear eats you, but always dress for the hunt!"

Another tradition was when a regular performer left the cast, a custom-designed artifact with obscure references to that person was placed on display to memorialize them; many of these were kept in a locked cabinet in the Treasure Room.

== Costumes ==
Throughout the years the costumes of the main characters changed several times. Emil Bleehall originally wore a plaid jacket and resembled a traveling salesman. This was later changed to a green "Junior Adventurer" outfit, reminiscent of a Boy Scout uniform. Hathaway Browne wore a Green Jacket, which was later supplanted by a leather aviator coat. As a result of the many layers of the newer costume, his character was often the object of jokes during the hot Florida summers. Fletcher Hodges went through one of the more strange transitions, switching from a professor lab coat to a "ponga" skirt with boxer shorts, then back to pants again. Pamelia Perkins originally wore a purple dress, then graduated to a blue dress with a prominent "Club President" sash. She continued to wear the sash through the rest of her costumes, including a bright dress reminiscent of a peacock (complete with a stuffed peacock hat) and her final costume, which was a red and blue kimono.

The later costumes were more outrageous than the earlier ones to make the characters stand out, and sometimes at the desires of new show directors. The cast would sometimes also add personal touches of their own, with some wearing different hats or carrying props.

== Musical numbers ==
Songs performed in the library shows include several written by comedians Heywood Banks (such as "The Cat Got Dead") and Tom Lehrer ("The Masochism Tango"). Others come from a wide variety of sources: Broadway, children's songs, pop and jazz, comedy.

Several of the longest running songs were originals written by the performers themselves ("Drop Your Drawers", "Adventure Keeps Calling My Name").

== Merchandise ==
- The club pin, most frequently given to a guest who participated in a show or ceremony, changed several times throughout the years. Size and materials have ranged from large plastic, to small metal, to the final pin being made of a stiff rubber to prevent conflict with the popular pin trading practice in the parks. There were also 2 special pins, one of them a jumbo pin, containing Disney animated characters dressed as Adventurers' Club characters, and created and designed by the Disney Design Group team.
- At various times souvenir cups have been sold in the shape of a ceramic tiki glass, a canteen, a monkey head, a human skull, a Yakoose head, a coconut carved to look like a monkey(a "Monkey Nut"), and more. There were also tiny plastic mugs (from the beer tasting show), shot glasses, and a set of 5 plastic glasses distributed in the final month of operation.
- Clothing items included T-shirts, sweat shirts, denim jackets, hats, and more.
- Other items made available through the years include a club creed scroll, cast photo, watch, pin buttons, and Pleasure Island themed merchandise which included the Adventurers' Club logo.
- Some objects provided by the performers during shows or improvisational segments, such as a pack of matches, napkin, and postal letters were always sought after collectables.
- There is a Disney Vinylmation 3 inch figure of Colonel Sunchbench. This small collectible is part of the Park 4 series. There is also a 3D pin of the same figure.
- There have been a number of Adventurers' Club themed metal pins made available as part of Disney Pin Trading

== Connection to the Jungle Cruise ==
There are several cross references between the Adventurers' Club and the Magic Kingdom Jungle Cruise attraction, both themed to the same era of time. Some of the artifacts in the club are attributed to scenes on the Jungle Cruise. The fastpass machines at the Jungle Cruise are designed to resemble travel trunks. Two of these have nametags on the top, one with Emil's address, and one with Pamelia's. Recently the tags have gone missing, either from vandalism or a deliberate redesign of the machines. In addition, several "artifacts" throughout the queue are labeled as belonging to a private collection from the Adventurers' Club, including its physical address. The Skipper Canteen, a restaurant in the Magic Kingdom, is supposedly run by the Jungle Navigation Co LTD (the company behind the Jungle Cruise) and has a cake on the menu called Kungaloosh. In 2021, the crashed plane at the Magic Kingdom attraction was given stenciling of "The Amazing Hathaway Browne" on the side.

== Connection to the S.E.A. ==
The Society of Explorers and Adventurers', or SEA for short, is an organization that Walt Disney Imagineering has been steadily incorporating into attractions around the world. When the Adventurers' Club closed, props would be saved and repurposed in other places and occasionally, narrative connections between the Adventurers' Club and SEA would be made in some of these locations, with the Adventurers' Club being established as being a successor or a branch established decades after most SEA attractions.

At Hong Kong Disneyland's Mystic Point, the Explorers Club Restaurant's collection of artifacts includes several pieces from the Mask Room. Lord Henry Mystic, the lead SEA member of the land, notes in journal excerpts on the wall that noticing the way these masks moved made him nervous enough to move them out of the main museum in the house. With the land being set in 1908, this makes this the first chronological home for them.

At the Magic Kingdom's Jungle Skipper Canteen Restaurant, inspired by the Jungle Cruise, a display case of SEA club fezes near the restaurant's SEA meeting room dining area features the SEA membership fez of Merryweather Pleasure. Additionally, one of the menu items is named for Pamelia Perkins, the Perkins Thai Noodles. The establishment also offers "Kungaloosh Spiced Excursion Ale," named for the cheer and cocktail, which is also offered at Disney's Animal Kingdom's Nomad Lounge.

At the Aulani resort kids club, Aunty's Beach House, a portrait that once hung in the Adventurer's Club and a letter from Pamelia Perkins identifies and retcons the figures depicted as being of a predecessor to the Adventurer's Club known as the "Pillagers Brigade" with a younger Harrison Hightower III of Tokyo Disney Sea's Tower of Terror among them, years before he joined SEA and eventually found the Shiriki Utundu Idol.

== In the media ==
- In the sandbox video game Garry's Mod, a user by the name of "brerben" recreated the near entirety of the Adventurer's Club.
- One of the Tales of the Wasteland tie-in comics to Epic Mickey features Oswald the Lucky Rabbit's take on the Adventurer's Club, dubbed the Misadventurer's Club, the story focusing around on their version of the Balderdash Cup Competition. Peter David, who wrote the comic, proposed to his wife at the Adventurer's Club.
