= Joe Rohde =

Experience architect at Virgin Galactic

- Rohde at Politics and Prose in 2026
- Born: Joseph Rohde; September 10, 1955 (age 71); Sacramento, California
- Education: Occidental College
- Awards: Disney Legend, 2024

Joseph Rohde is an American themed entertainment designer and artist, serving as the Experience Architect for Virgin Galactic. Rohde was previously a veteran executive at Walt Disney Imagineering, the division of The Walt Disney Company that designs and builds Disney's theme parks and resort hotels. Rohde's formal title was Executive Designer and Vice President, Creative.

Rohde was born in Sacramento, California and raised in Hawaii. He graduated from Chaminade College Preparatory, Canoga Park, Calif., in 1973, where he starred in student dramatic productions and was Class Salutatorian. Rohde received a bachelor's degree in Fine Arts from Occidental College in Los Angeles.

Rohde's trademark is a large collection of earrings he wears in his left ear, all of which are souvenirs from decades of travel to remote corners of the world. This tradition began when he stuck his 5-year anniversary pin into his ear.

== Career at Walt Disney Imagineering ==
Rohde was the lead designer of Disney's Animal Kingdom, one of four theme parks at Walt Disney World Resort in Florida, and the principal creative force behind the park's Expedition Everest thrill ride, which debuted in 2006. He was one of the lead designers behind the Disney Vacation Club property Aulani in Oʻahu, Hawaii. He was chosen for the role because of his experience with the island and its native people, having grown up in Hawaii.

Rohde joined Disney Imagineering in 1980 during the development of Epcot as a model designer and scenic painter for the theme park's Mexico pavilion. He later worked as a designer on the refurbishment of Fantasyland at Disneyland, the Captain EO 3-D film attraction starring singer Michael Jackson, the Norway pavilion at Epcot, and the Adventurers Club, a 1930s-themed bar and lounge that opened in 1989 within the Pleasure Island entertainment district at Walt Disney World Resort.

Rohde was featured in an April 2006 Travel Channel documentary titled Expedition Everest: Journey to Sacred Lands. The program was produced by Discovery Networks during expeditions to China and Nepal in 2005 called Mission Himalayas. The treks were sponsored by Discovery, Disney, and Conservation International to promote the Expedition Everest theme park attraction and conduct scientific and cultural research in remote areas of the Himalayas. Rohde served as the model for Harrison Hightower, the owner of the fictional "Hightower Hotel" which houses the Tower of Terror attraction at Tokyo DisneySea outside Tokyo, Japan.

After designing Aulani in Hawaii, Rohde was tasked with creating Pandora – The World of Avatar at Disney's Animal Kingdom. The project took six years to complete and opened in May 2017. Rohde led the team that transformed the former Tower of Terror at Disney California Adventure into Guardians of the Galaxy – Mission: Breakout!. The attraction opened in May 2017. This project was part of the expansion of his role as global creative leader of the Marvel property. In February 2020, Rohde served as the lead developer on Disney's second private island, Lookout Cay at Lighthouse Point.

On November 23, 2020, Rohde announced his retirement from Walt Disney Imagineering effective January 4, 2021. On February 22, 2021, Virgin Galactic announced Joe Rohde had been hired as their Experience Architect.
