= List of largest cannabis companies by revenue =

This is a list of the world's largest cannabis companies by revenue. The list shows cannabis companies ranked by annual revenue.

The list includes companies whose primary business activities are associated with the cannabis industry.

Globally, Curaleaf is the largest cannabis company in the world.

== Legend ==
Column	Explanation
Rank	Rank of company by revenue
Company	Name of the company
Revenue	Amount of revenue
Market Cap	Market capitalization
Headquarters	Location of company's headquarters

== List ==
Ranked by total revenues.

Rank	Company	Revenue ($B)	Market Cap ($M)	Headquarters
1	Curaleaf	$1.77	$10,166	Stamford, Connecticut, United States
2	Trulieve	$1.65		Quincy, Florida, United States
3	Green Thumb Industries	$1.61	$5,250	Chicago, Illinois, United States
4	Tilray	$1.15	$8,312	Nanaimo, British Columbia, Canada
5	Verano Holdings	$0.87		Chicago, Illinois, United States
6	Ascend Wellness Holdings	$0.71		Morristown, New Jersey, United States
7	Aphria	$0.550	$4,130	Leamington, Ontario, Canada
8	Canopy Growth Corporation	$0.400	$9,757	Smiths Falls, Ontario, Canada
9	Aurora Cannabis	$0.054	$1,841	Edmonton, Alberta, Canada
10	Organigram Inc.	$0.017	$1,065	Moncton, New Brunswick, Canada
11	CannTrust Holdings	$0.013	$394	Vaughan, Ontario, Canada
12	Cronos Group	$0.09	$5,419	Toronto, Ontario, Canada

== See also ==
- Cannabis in Canada
