= Boris Jordan =

Russian-American businessman

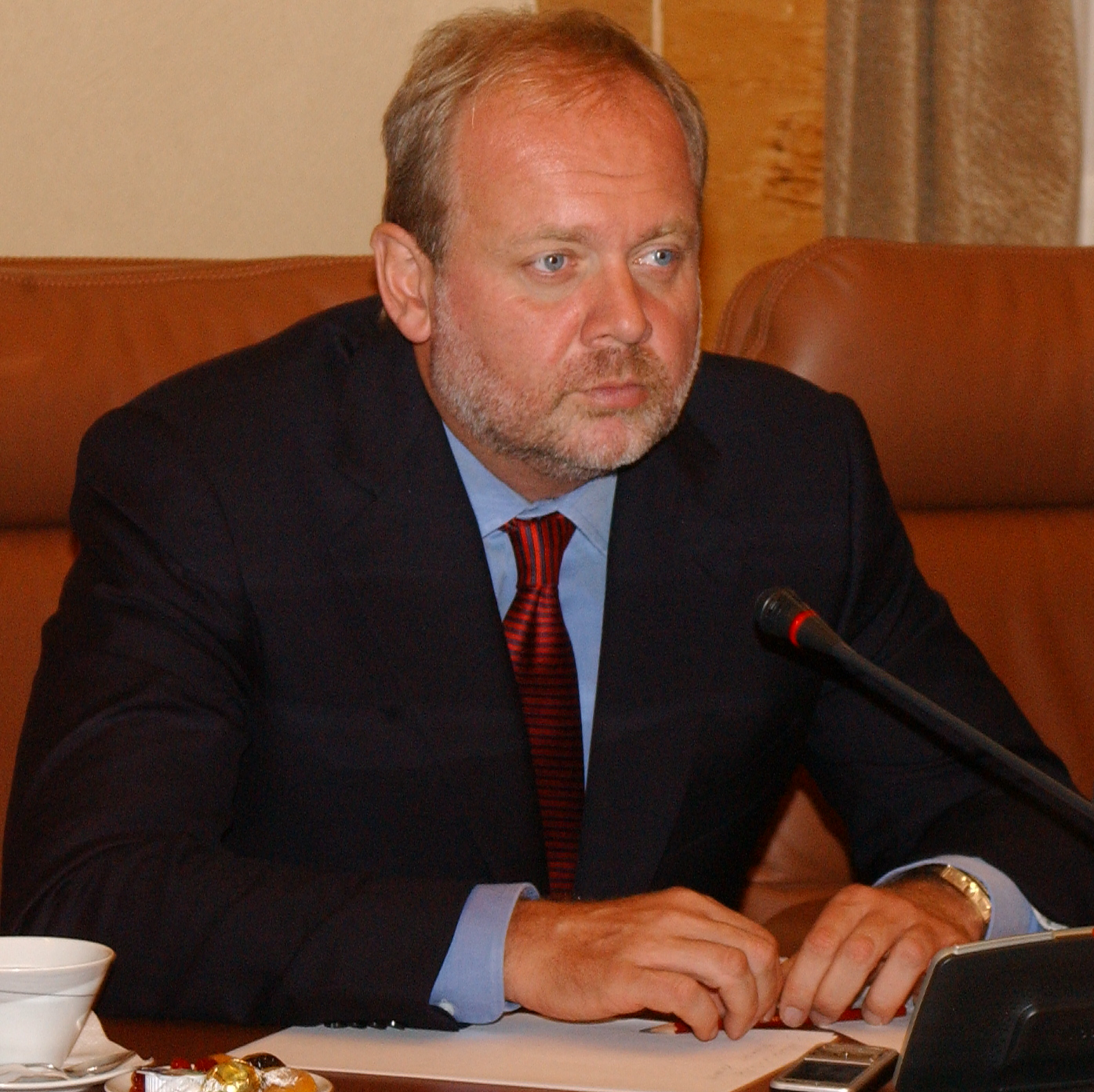
- Jordan in 2007
- Born: 2 June 1966 (age 60); Sea Cliff, New York, US
- Education: New York University
- Occupation: Businessman
- Known for: Former CEO of Gazprom Media; Founder Renaissance Capital; CEO of Sputnik Group; CEO of Curaleaf

Boris Jordan (Russian: Борис Алексеевич Йордан, born 2 June 1966) is a Russian-American billionaire businessman, who is the founder and executive chairman of Curaleaf.

== Early life ==
Jordan was born in Sea Cliff, New York (on Long Island) to Russian emigrant parents. His father, Aleksey Borisovich Jordan, (Note: Boris Jordan's paternal grandfather Boris Mikhailovich Jordan was in the Page Corps until 1907, had fought in the Great War as a Life Guard Ulansky Regiment until mid-1915 after which he served in staff positions, later fought as a White Russian during the Russian Civil War, was evacuated with Wrangel's forces from Crimea in November 1920 and lived in Skopje. After World War II, he lived in Salzburg before emigrating to the United States, where he died on 20 July 1950.) had lived in Yugoslavia and was a graduate of the "Cadet Corps" in 1941. His mother, Maria Alexandrovna Jordan (née Shishkova), whose father was Alexander Tikhonovich Shishkov, graduated from New York University. According to Boris Jordan, his grandfather was the Russian Minister of Provisions under Pyotr Stolypin before the Russian Revolution. Jordan is a grand nephew of Czar Nicholas II's physician Eugene Botkin.

Jordan earned a bachelor's degree in Russian–American Economic Relations from New York University.

== Career ==
Jordan assisted Russia's economic transition to capitalism in the early 1990s, assisting in the launch of the Russian stock market and the privatization of state assets. Jordan worked closely with Bruce Gardner, who was the director of the Russian Center for Privatization under the Government of the Russian Federation.

From 1992 until 1995, Jordan co-headed, along with New Zealander Stephen Jennings, the Moscow subsidiary of the Credit Suisse First Boston bank. Under his tenure, Credit Suisse First Boston AO, later CS First Boston, became a leading investment bank in Russia, engaged in privatization, corporate finance and securities trading. Jordan created the Russian Direct Investment Fund.

Jordan was a co-founder of Renaissance Capital investment group (founded in 1995), with Stephen Jennings. (Note: Both Alexander Provotorov (born 7 November 1974, Moscow) and Konstantin Malofeev, who were close friends and classmates at Moscow State University (MSU), worked together at Renaissance Capital after their graduation from MSU in 1996 until its default in 1998. Provotorov, whose wife is Yuri Skuratov's daughter Alexandra Yurievna Skuratova (born on 18 August 1981), was an attorney with the Boris Jordan associated Sputnik investment group until 2001 when he became Head of the Legal Department of Gazprom-Media OJSC. In 2003, Provotorov returned to Sputnik Investment Group and was the Vice President of the Investment Department for two years before Konstantin Malofeev, who by that time had founded the investment fund Marshall Capital Partners, hired Provotorov as the CEO of Marshall Capital Partners in 2006.)

On 25 November 1998, billionaire Vladimir Potanin recommended Jordan to be Chairman of Sidanko which Jordan held until February 1999 when he stepped down.

Jordan is the president and CEO of the Sputnik Group Ltd., which he launched in 1998. The Sputnik Group is a diversified holding company, which manages the Sputnik Funds, the largest foreign private-equity funds invested in Russia. The Sputnik Group currently owns proprietary investments in Russian insurance (Renaissance Insurance), forestry, telecommunications and media sectors – as well as a number of investments in foreign companies.

In 1999, he established the Cadet Corps Fund, and is the Fund's president.

In 2001–2003, he was the CEO of the Russian TV channel NTV and also CEO of Gazprom Media, a subsidiary media holding of Gazprom.

Later appointed chief executive of Russia's Gazprom Media as well as general director of its NTV television network, Jordan was forced to resign in early 2003 under political pressure.

He is chairman of Curaleaf, an American cannabis company.

== Personal life ==
=== Alyosha Jordan ===
After the fall of the USSR, his father Alexei "Alyosha" Borisovich Jordan (Russian: Алексей "Алеша" Борисович Йордан) with support from the All-Cadet Association (Russian: Кадетское объединение) in New York, California, Venezuela, Argentina and France travelled to Russia to reestablish the Cadet Corps according to Vladimir Kirillovich Golitsyn or "Mickey" Galitzine (Russian: Владимир Кириллович Голицын; 29 January 1942, Belgrade – 22 February 2018, Pennsylvania) who was a longtime employee of the Bank of New York. Alyosha Jordan graduated from the First Russian Grand Duke Konstantin Konstantinovich of the Cadet Corps in Yugoslavia and was the editor-in-chief of the émigré magazine "Cadet Roll Call" and became the Curator of Cadet Corps in post-Soviet Russia. In 1999, Boris Jordan established the Alexei Jordan Foundation for Assistance to Cadet Corps (Russian: Фонд содействия кадетским корпусам им. Алексея Йордана), which financially supports more than 60 cadet corps throughout Russia, and contributes to it through his Sputnik Group.

=== Boris Jordan and family ===
Jordan is fluent in English and Russian. In 2011, Jordan, an NYU alumni, established the Jordan Center for the Advanced Study of Russia at NYU. He purchased a penthouse in South Beach, Miami in 2014 for $20 million. He sold it in May 2018 to Cliff Asness, for a record $26 million.

=== Nicholas Jordan ===
Jordan's brother, Nicholas Jordan, has an extensive career in Russia related entities and finance. He is fluent in Russian and English. In 1982, he graduated from Boston University with a bachelor's degree majoring in political science and embarked upon a career in finance.

At Deutsche Bank, he was Alfred Koch's banker when Koch was with Gazprom-Media. Nicholas Jordan supported his brother during the privatization of Russia. He worked at Deutsche Bank for 10 years and united the teams at Deutsche Bank with the Ilya Sherbovich and Boris Fyodorov associated United Financial Group (UFG) (Russian: «Объединенной финансовой группы» (ОФГ))), which was sold to Deutsche Bank in 2005, according to Charles Ryan who was the CEO of Deutsche Bank Group in Russia and was a co-founder with Boris Fyodorov of UFG. After Nicholas Jordan co-headed Russian investment at Deutsche Bank spearheading the financial backing of the Kremlin's aims for financing the Gazprom expansion into petroleum, he went to Lehman to re enter the Russian markets in March 2007. He received nearly $7 million to re establish the Lehman Brothers Holdings' Moscow office in 2007 as head of its Russia operations.

In 2015, he left the UBS Group after 3 years to join Goldman Sachs as the co-CEO of Goldman Russia. In September 2015, he joined Oleg Boyko's Finstar as CEO. From March until October 2018, he was at Big Un Limited.

In January 2019, he joined the boards of Oleg Deripaska's En+ Group and his Rusal.

== See also ==
- NTV Russia
- Renaissance Capital
