= Pleasure Island (Walt Disney World) =

Former part of the Walt Disney World Resort

- The final logo of Pleasure Island.
- Interactive map of Pleasure Island
- Location: Walt Disney World Resort, Downtown Disney, Lake Buena Vista, Florida, U.S.
- Coordinates: 28.371°N 81.518°W
- Status: Defunct
- Opened: May 1, 1989
- Closed: September 27, 2008
- Owner: The Walt Disney Company
- Operated by: Walt Disney Parks and Resorts

Pleasure Island was an area of the Downtown Disney shopping center at Walt Disney World Resort in Lake Buena Vista, Florida. It officially opened on May 1, 1989. On September 27, 2008, all of its clubs were closed, but its retail stores and restaurants remained open. The area is now called The Landing and is the central part of Disney Springs.

== History ==
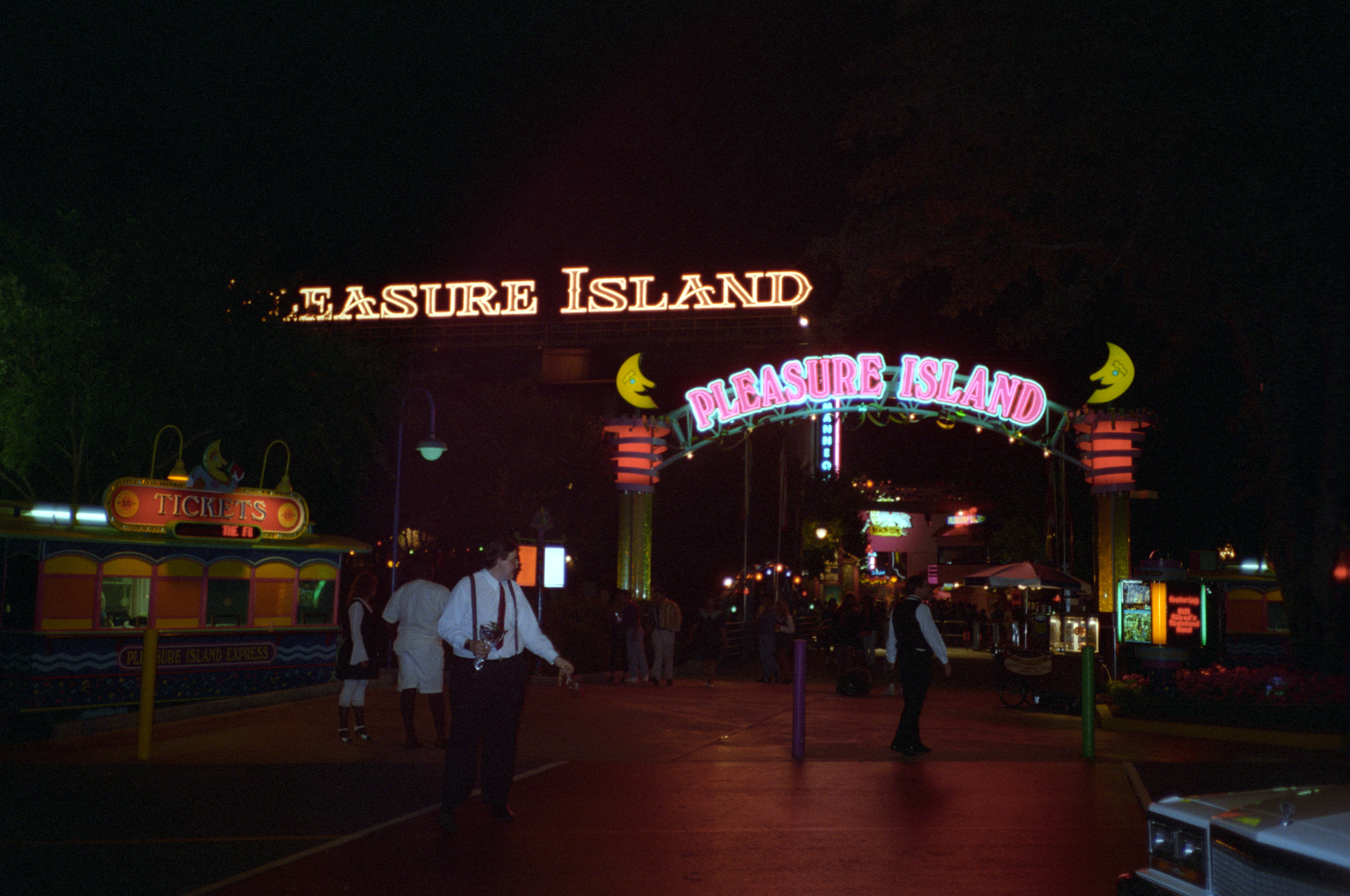
Pleasure Island in 1995

As the name originates from a fictional location in Walt Disney's 1940 film Pinocchio, Pleasure Island opened emulating Church Street Station in Downtown Orlando, Florida. At that time, this was a highly successful gated attraction which offered admission to multiple clubs for one price.

The legend the Disney Company created is that Pleasure Island was based on the fictitious owner, Merriweather Adam Pleasure, and was carried on into one of its clubs, The Adventurers Club. Merriweather Pleasure was said to be an industrialist and explorer who decided to move his family to Florida and start a new sailmaking and yacht construction business on the island during the 1920s through early 1940s. He enjoyed throwing parties for his employees and friends after hours, but, eventually, he was lost at sea, his sons failed at running the company without him, and the island was mostly destroyed in a storm. As the story goes, Disney would rediscover the ruins of the Pleasure complex and establish a nightclub district to carry on Pleasure's merrymaking spirit.

Every night at midnight, New Year's Eve was celebrated at Pleasure Island with a fireworks show. This tradition lasted from 1990 through New Year's Eve 2005.

=== Changes in 2006 ===
Major renovations to Pleasure Island were made in March 2006 in an attempt to reverse declining attendance. These changes included the closing and dismantling of the West End Stage and the Hub Stage. Since there was no longer an entry fee, the free entertainment provided by these stages was attracting large groups of local teens, which was considered undesirable. The area formerly occupied by the West End Stage is the location of the new pedestrian bridge to Downtown Disney West Side and provides visitors a greater line-of-sight view from Pleasure Island to the West Side. The removal of the Hub Stage opened a small area to a view of the lagoon located behind Pleasure Island, including a dock. In late June 2006, a life-size Jessica Rabbit sign above the facility of "Pleasure Island Tonight!" was removed.

The construction of new docks allow boat transportation links between West Side, Pleasure Island, Marketplace, and Disney resorts across the lagoon and up the Sassagoula River.

=== Changes from 2007 to 2009 ===
Effective January 1, 2007, the dance clubs reverted to a policy which required guests to be age 21 or older. Minors could still visit the Comedy Warehouse and Adventurers Club, as well as the shops and restaurants on the island.

In late June 2008, Disney announced that the six remaining night clubs at Pleasure Island would close by September 28, 2008, to make room for additional family-oriented entertainment. Effective June 27, 2008, customers who purchased annual passes to Pleasure Island could receive a pro-rated refund for that purchase, due to the September 2008 scheduled closure of all of its nightclubs.

Disney officials stated that the Pleasure Island nightclub closures are in response to customers who desire more broad-based dining and retail opportunities.

September 27, 2008, was Pleasure Island's last night. Among the capacity crowd were many of its past actors and cast members, some of whom started to line up at 9:00 in the morning to ensure entrance to what would be a very emotional and busy night. Highlights included Frankie and the West End Boys playing on the waterfront stage. At midnight, New Year's Eve was celebrated one last time. A fireworks show was complemented by popular songs heard on the island over the years. The final song played in Mannequins was "Everybody's Free (To Feel Good)" by Rozalla. With that, Pleasure Island was officially shut down. By the next day, many of the clubs' signs and logos were being removed or painted over.

In February 2009, amid rumors of a partial reopening of Pleasure Island, Disney announced that three former clubs would become available for private party rentals. Motion, Soundstage Club, and Adventurers Club were available for rental through the end of March 2010.

In 2009, a building that previously housed stores and a fast food restaurant was completely renovated by E-Brands, the operator of the Samba Room restaurant in Orlando, into Paradiso 37, a Central/South American-themed restaurant.

=== Hyperion Wharf ===
On November 10, 2010, Disney announced Hyperion Wharf would be the new name for Pleasure Island. The new theme of the island would be an early 20th-century nautical warehouse district. $3.2 million in new lighting features were to be added, in addition to a waterfront entertainment area and a lighthouse structure. No names for shops, restaurants or entertainment venues were announced. There was no indication that any of the former clubs would reopen.

Permits and plans showed the buildings which formerly housed the Motion and Rock 'n' Roll Beach Club, Adventurers Club and BET Soundstage Club would be demolished. The buildings which formerly housed the Comedy Warehouse, 8TRAX and Mannequins clubs would remain. Demolition of Motion and Rock 'n' Roll Beach Club took place between December 2010 and February 2011. Earlier in 2010, the bridge from the Downtown Disney Marketplace to Pleasure Island was widened to accommodate a new, wider pedestrian pathway across the island.

On December 3, 2012, Disney allowed the trademark for Hyperion Wharf to expire. Renovation plans for the area were announced as part of the Downtown Disney redevelopment in 2013.

During 2014, Disney closed access to the Pleasure Island portion of Downtown Disney, as additional retailers and theme restaurants were brought into the mix. Disney ultimately decided against using the name "Hyperion Wharf".

=== The Landing ===
Instead, in April 2015, Disney reopened Pleasure Island as the middle link of the Downtown Disney shopping area. This section of the complex is now called "The Landing". The former dance clubs, jazz club, and Adventurers Club are no longer part of the concept. Instead, the area focuses on retail and restaurants, though one restaurant circuitously links the new area to its predecessor: Jock Lindsey's Hangar Bar was ostensibly opened by pilot Jock Lindsey (who appeared in the 1981 Indiana Jones film Raiders of the Lost Ark), who is a member of the Society of Explorers and Adventurers. A fez housed in the Skipper Canteen in Magic Kingdom's Adventureland establishes that Pleasure Island founder Merriweather Adam Pleasure was also a member of the S.E.A., with his Adventurers Club retroactively serving as his own private chapter of the Society.

== Operating attractions ==
=== Restaurants ===
- Paradiso 37 — A North, South and Central American restaurant named for the 37 countries located in those areas, and includes a food court section as well as an upscale tequila bar. It features a focus on dishes famously sold by street vendors in those countries. This restaurant is managed by E Brands, and was the first new restaurant to open from the Pleasure Island renovations which began in 2008. It is located in a building which formerly housed shops and a fast food restaurant. Dishes include sandwiches, steaks, chicken, and an extensive appetizer menu. Paradiso 37 opened on June 4, 2009.
- Portobello Restaurant — An Italian restaurant patterned after an osteria. It opened with the clubs in 1989. Portobello Restaurant was known as Portobello Yacht Club until renovations in late 2008. In the context of the Island's backstory, the restaurant was once the Pleasure Family Home. Portobello is no longer open, and has been replaced by Terralina.
- Raglan Road Irish Pub & Restaurant — Operated by Great Irish Pubs Florida. It opened in October 2005, replacing Merriweather's Market and the Pleasure Island Jazz Company.

=== Shopping ===
For many years, a number of small shops and boutiques were located between the Adventurers Club and Rock 'n' Roll Beach Club. Many of these shops closed in March 2006 as part of the renovation of the island. However, Disney has begun to reintroduce selected stores on the island.

- Curl by Sammy Duvall — A surf-themed retail establishment operated by Florida-based water skier Sammy Duvall. Curl opened in 2008, replacing Superstar Studios.
- Fuego by Sosa Cigars — A cigar bar which opened in 2007, located near the center of the island.
- Orlando Harley-Davidson — A "gear shop" operated by Orlando's Harley-Davidson franchiser. It opened in 2005, located near Raglan Road.

== Former attractions ==
=== Shopping ===
- Superstar Studios — A long-time "make-your-own-video" studio which was replaced by Curl by Sammy Duvall in 2008.
- Jessica's - A store featuring the character Jessica Rabbit from the 1988 film Who Framed Roger Rabbit, which opened in 1990 and closed in 1992. A two-sided, thirty-foot neon sign of Jessica Rabbit with a swinging leg and moving sequins hung over the building until the store's closing. In 1993, the sign was relocated to the West End Stage where it resided until 2006.
- Avigators Supply - A store located close to the Adventurers Club. It sold aviation and adventure gear branded with the Avigators logo. It also sold Adventurers Club and Indiana Jones merchandise. It was replaced by Mouse House which was replaced by Paradiso 37.
- Changing Attitudes - Trendy clothing and unusual gifts.
- Doodles - Pleasure island memorabilia, hip graphic T-shirts, trendy gifts.
- Hammer and Fire - Hand-crafted jewelry, accessories and unusual gifts.
- The Mouse House - Disney T-shirts, plush animals and gifts.
- Suspended Animation - Disney animated cels, posters, prints and lithographs.
- DTV - Modern Disney fashions from silks and sequins to painted jeans.
- Music Legends - Clothing, books, music, and music memorabilia.
- Reel Finds - Movie Memorabilia: autographs, jewelry, costumes, and props.

=== Restaurants ===
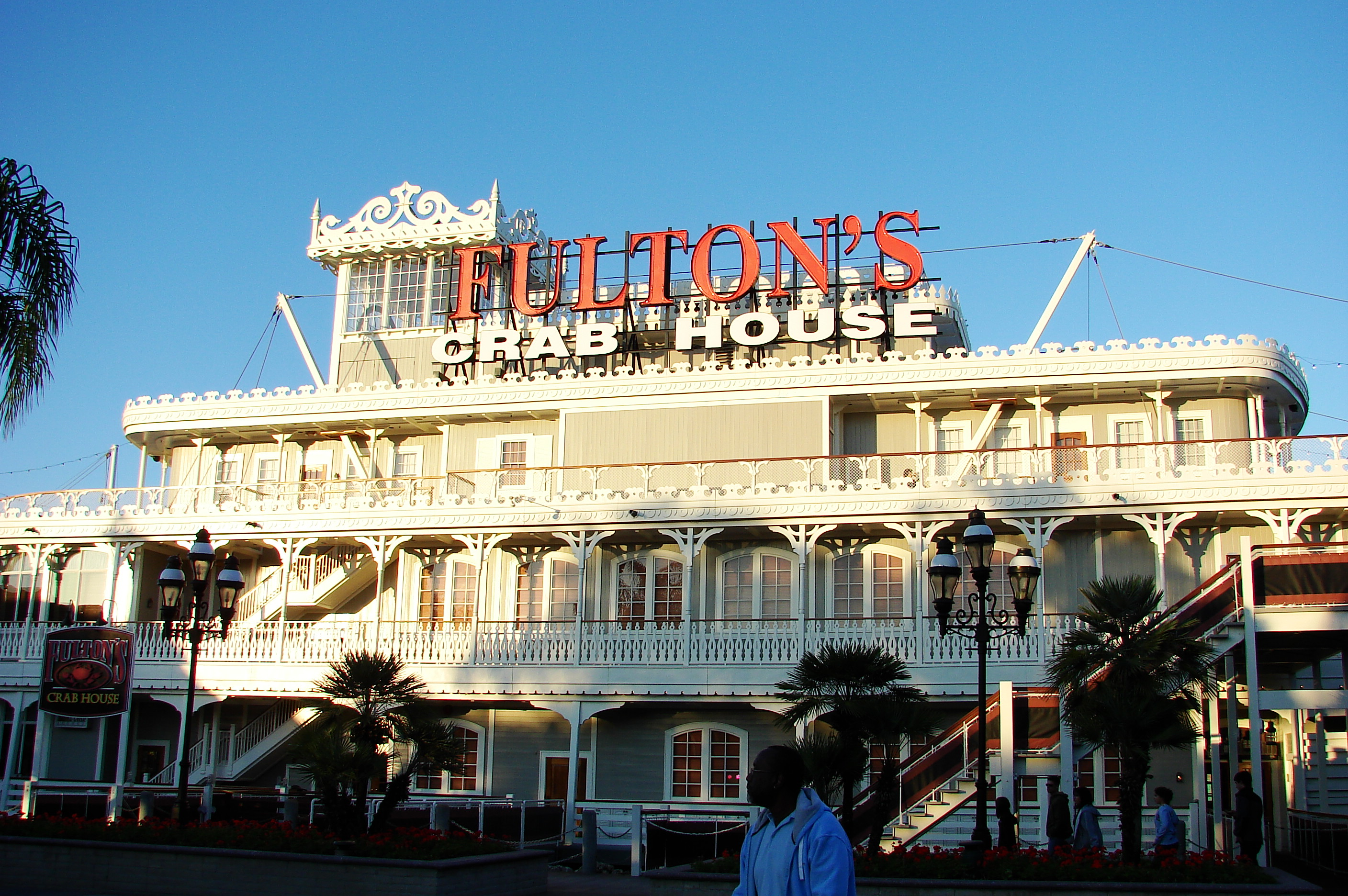
Fulton's Crab House riverboat restaurant

- Fulton's Crab House — A seafood restaurant which has been operated by Levy Restaurants since March 10, 1996. It originally opened on May 1, 1977, as the Empress Lilly. The head chef is Frank Walason.
- The Empress Lilly — An authentic recreation of a 19th-century paddle steamer boat in Rococo (Louis XIV) style. It was operated by Disney and named in homage to Walt Disney's's wife Lillian. Upon becoming Fulton's Crab House, the boat lost its paddle wheel and smokestacks. It was divided into four separate restaurants and lounges, including the Baton Rouge Lounge, Steerman's Quarters, Fisherman's Deck, and the Empress Room.
- Fireworks Factory — A pyrotechnics-themed restaurant operated by Levy Restaurants. According to the island's fictional backstory, Merriweather Pleasure manufactured fireworks in the building until one of his cigars caused an explosion. The restaurant was decorated with authentic pyrotechnic props from the Grucci family. It operated from 1989 to 1997, and was replaced by the Motion dance club.
- Merriweather's Market — A food court that operated from 1989 to 1993, and was replaced by Raglan Road Irish Pub & Restaurant in October 2005.
- Planet Hollywood - It was a Pleasure Island attraction when it opened in 1994. In 1998 it moved to West Side. In 2017 it was replaced by the Planet Hollywood Observatory.
- Hill Street Diner - Pizza, hotdogs, hot deli sandwiches, french fries and assorted salads.
- D-Zertz - Cappuccino and espresso, pastries, frozen yogurt and soft serve ice cream with toppings.

=== Entertainment ===
Entertainment venues included:

- 8TRAX — A 1970s and 1980s themed dance club. It closed on September 27, 2008. The club opened on December 31, 1992, replacing:
- Videopolis East — Opened in 1989, playing new wave music on 170 video screens. In 1990 it was renamed Cage, adding more progressive music before closing in 1992.
- Adventurers Club — A 1930s-style British explorers' club that featured a staff of flamboyant characters portrayed by improv actors. The club closed on September 27, 2008.
- BET Soundstage — A hip-hop and R&B dance club operated by Black Entertainment Television (formerly BET Holdings Inc). It closed on September 27, 2008. The licensing agreement with BET Holdings Inc. was created before Black Entertainment Television was purchased by Viacom (which owned networks such as Nickelodeon, a rival to Disney's own Disney Channel) in 2000. The club opened in 1998, replacing:
- Neon Armadillo — A club featuring live country music bands, it operated from 1989 to 1998.
- Celebrate Tonight — An outdoor dance party featuring DJs and cast members known as the Party Team. Focused mainly on families with children, it opened in early April 2009 and closed on June 26, 2010. It took place in the large brick expanse between the former Comedy Warehouse and BET Soundstage, an area renamed Celebration Plaza.
- Comedy Warehouse — A nightclub which featured an improv comedy troupe. It originally featured a parody show called "Forbidden Disney". The club soon attracted a large return audience. The move to the improv format after a couple of seasons was made to keep the show fresh. The club closed September 27, 2008.
- Mannequins Dance Palace — A techno-trance multi-story dance club which featured a revolving lighted dance floor. The club featured nightly light shows with synchronized music and live performances by human "mannequins". The club closed on September 27, 2008.
- Motion — A dance club which featured Top 40 music videos. It closed September 27, 2008. The club opened in 2001, replacing the Wildhorse Saloon; which formally was the Fireworks Factory.
- Wildhorse Saloon — A country music dance club and BBQ restaurant which opened in 1998 to capitalize on the country/western dance craze at the time. It was operated by Levy Restaurants and Gaylord Entertainment Company, which also operated a Wildhorse in Nashville, Tennessee. They eventually sold their interest in the building back to Disney, and the venue closed in 2001.
- Pleasure Island Jazz Company — A club featuring live jazz musicians which opened on August 27, 1993. It was replaced by Raglan Road Irish Pub & Restaurant in October 2005.
- Rock 'n' Roll Beach Club — A rock-themed dance club which featured live bands (usually local cover bands). It closed on February 2, 2008. The club opened on April 4, 1990, replacing:
- XZFR Rockin' Rollerdrome — A short lived club where guests could strap on skates and dance to rock and roll
- West End Stage - A stage used for events every night. The roof of the stage was torn down in 2009 and most of the stage was taken to the Disney Boneyard with small parts intact. It was replaced by Celebration Plaza in 2009.
- AMC Pleasure Island 24 - In April 1990 these theaters opened with 10 screens as a Pleasure Island attraction but in January 1998 AMC expanded to 24 screens and became a part of West Side. The name was changed in 2010 to AMC Theatres Downtown Disney 24 and then, the name was changed to AMC Theatres Disney Springs 24 in 2015.

Performers included:

- New Kids on the Block (1989)
- Marky Mark & the Funky Bunch (1992)
- Blind Melon (1993, West End Stage)
- Johnny Cash (1995)
- Boy George (1995)
- *NSYNC (1995, filmed a demo at Rock 'n' Roll Beach Club)
- Savage Garden (1997)
- Christina Aguilera (1999, West End Stage)
- Hootie & the Blowfish (1999, New Year's Eve)
- The B-52's (1999, New Year's Eve)
- Styx (1999, New Year's Eve)
- Duran Duran (2000)

==== Gallery ====
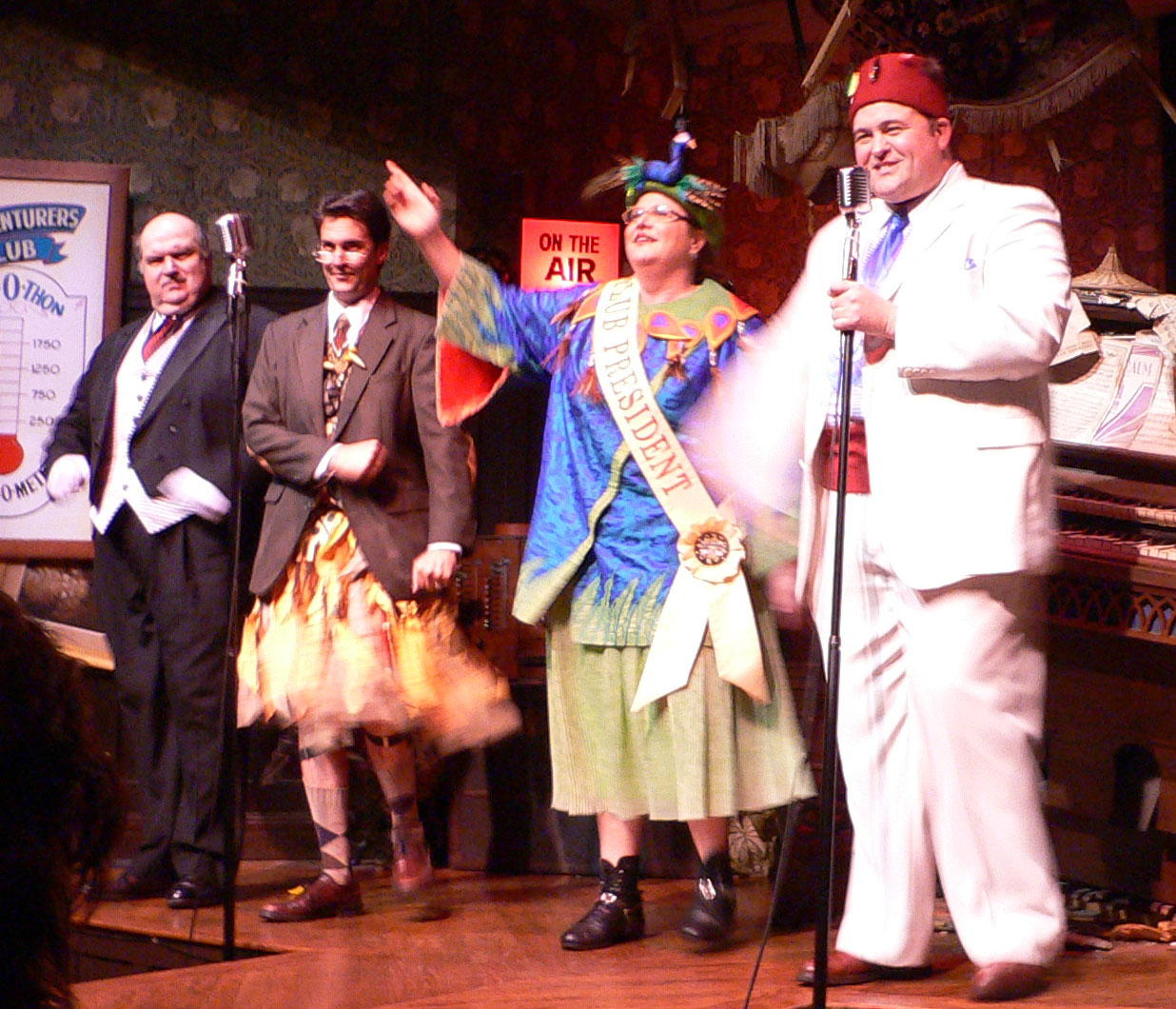
The cast of the Adventurers Club.

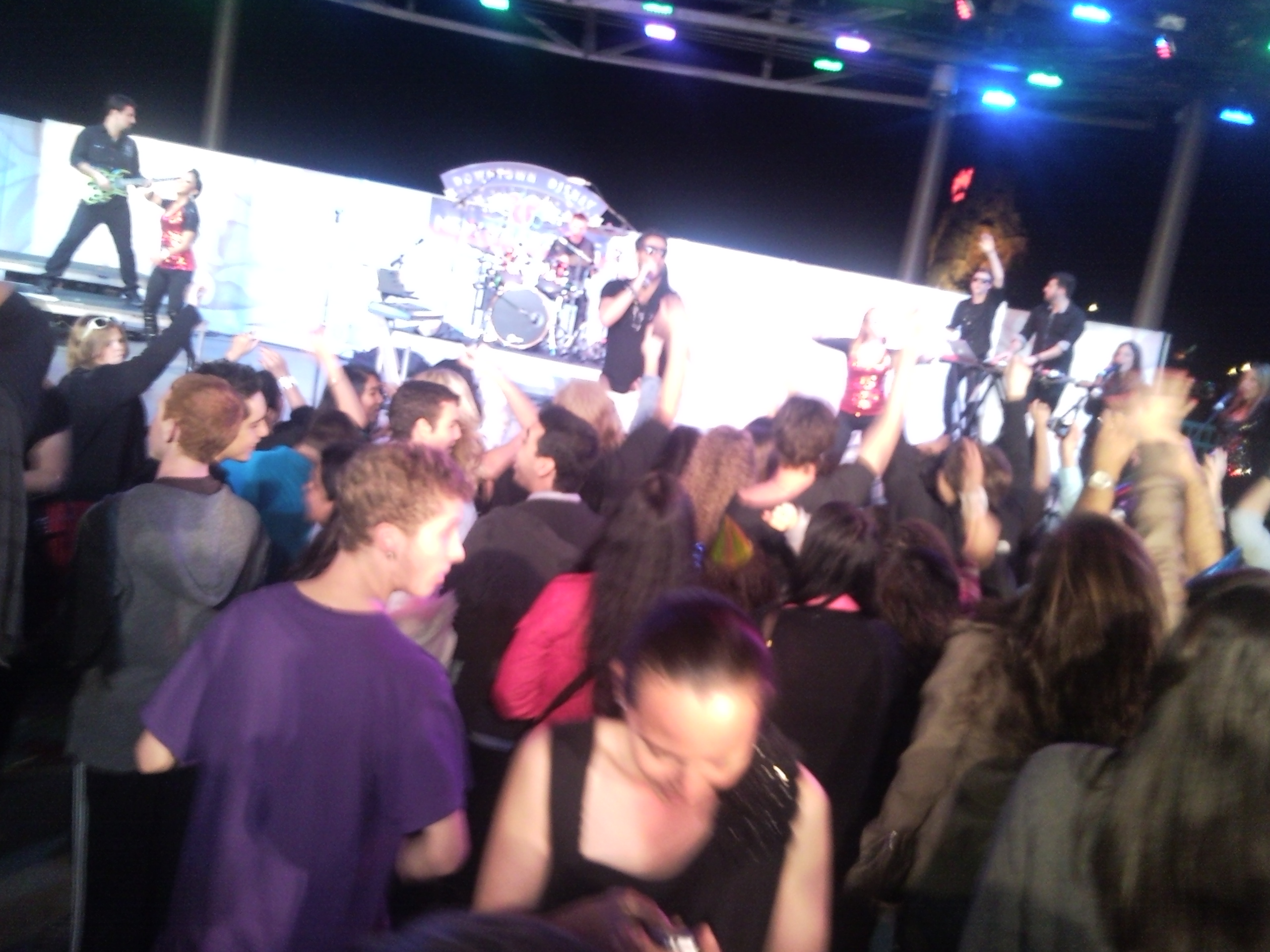
A concert of New Year's Day 2012.

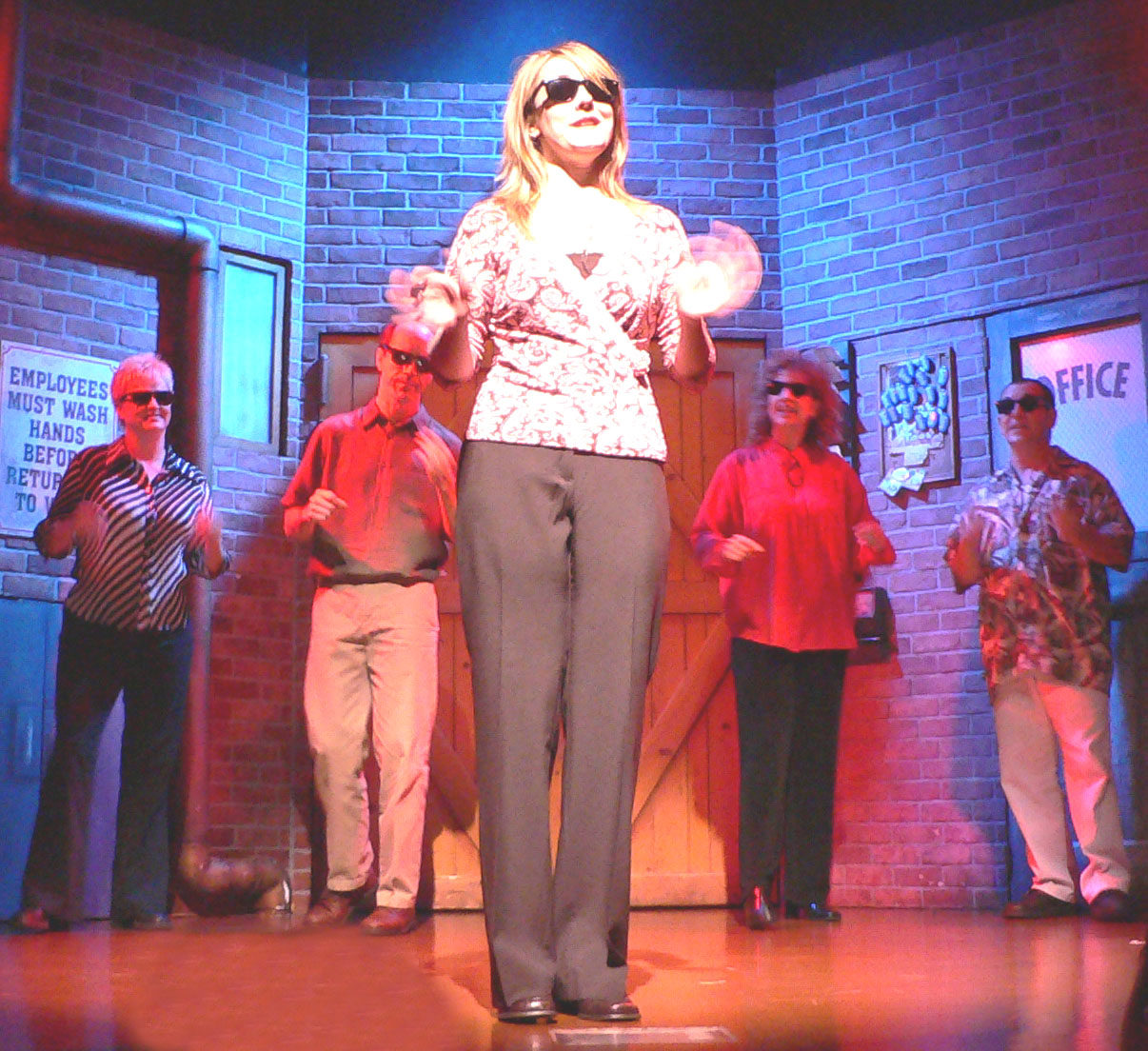
Comedians in the Comedy Warehouse perform a musical number.

== In popular culture ==
- "Itchy & Scratchy Land", an episode of The Simpsons from 1994, features the family visiting the theme park Itchy and Scratchy Land, a parody of Walt Disney World. Marge and Homer visit "Parents' Island", which features a '70s-themed dance club where New Year's Eve is celebrated every few minutes.
