= Curaleaf =

Cannabis company

- Company type: Public
- Traded as: OTCQX: CURLF; TSX: CURA
- Industry: Cannabis industry
- Founded: 2010
- Headquarters: Stamford, Connecticut, United States
- Key people: Boris Jordan, Chairman and CEO
- Website: curaleaf.com

Curaleaf Holdings, Inc. is an American cannabis company publicly traded on the Canadian Securities Exchange. The company is headquartered in Stamford, Connecticut. Founded in 2010, it produces and distributes cannabis products in North America, operating dispensaries in multiple states. As of 2025, it is the world's largest cannabis company by revenue.

== History ==
Curaleaf was founded in 2010 under the name PalliaTech. It operated in New Jersey and had a research center in Colorado. In 2013, the investment group Sputnik purchased a 35% stake in the company. The company name was changed to Curaleaf in 2018, just prior to going public on Toronto's Canadian Securities Exchange under the symbol CURA. It also raised $400 million in what was considered the largest stock offering in cannabis industry history. By 2020, Curaleaf grew to be the largest Cannabis company in the world.

Curaleaf has made several acquisitions in the cannabis industry. It acquired the cannabis oil brand Select in 2019, making it the largest cannabis operator in the United States. The following year it acquired Colorado based edibles maker BlueKudu, which is known for its infused chocolates and gummies. In 2020, Curaleaf became the world's largest cannabis company by revenue after the purchase of its Chicago-based competitor Grassroots Cannabis. The purchase also expanded the company into 23 states in the U.S.

In April 2021, Curaleaf announced that it had completed its previously announced acquisition of EMMAC Life Sciences Limited ("EMMAC"), the largest vertically integrated independent cannabis company in Europe. The acquisition gives Curaleaf cultivation, EU GMP-certified processing, distribution, and R&D operations in several key European cannabis markets, including the United Kingdom, Germany, Italy, Spain and Portugal.

In May 2021, Curaleaf announced it had signed a definitive agreement to acquire Los Sueños Farms, a 36-acre outdoor marijuana growing operation in Colorado, for over $60 million.

In September 2021, an Oregon subsidiary of the company, Cura Cannabis, mistakenly distributed tinctures with THC that were mislabeled as containing only CBD. This led to a recall by The Oregon Liquor and Cannabis Commission (OLCC).
