= Levy Restaurants =

American restaurant and hospitality company

- Type: Subsidiary
- Industry: Hospitality
- Founded: 1978
- Founder: Larry Levy & Mark Levy
- Headquarters: Chicago, Illinois, U.S.
- Area served: North America
- Key people: Andy Lansing (President and CEO)
- Products: Food and Beverage, Retail
- Revenue: ▲US$ 1.5 billion (2017)
- Number of employees: 50,000
- Parent: Compass Group (2006–present)

Levy Restaurants ("Levy") is an American food service and hospitality company based in Chicago, Illinois. Levy provides catering and beverage services at more than 80 entertainment and sports venues in the United States and Canada. It is the largest food service contractor in North American professional sports, with nearly a 40% market share. Founded in 1978 with a single family-run delicatessen in Water Tower Place, Levy has been a wholly owned subsidiary of Britain's Compass Group since 2006.

== History ==
The company was founded in 1968 in Chicago by Larry and Mark Levy of St. Louis. The first property was D.B. Kaplan's Delicatessen in Chicago's Water Tower Place. In 1982, the company began to work in stadiums and arenas with restaurants and food service locations at Chicago's Comiskey Park (former home of the Chicago White Sox) and, in 1985, in Chicago's Wrigley Field (home of the Chicago Cubs.)

In 1989, the company was selected by The Walt Disney Company to own and operate two locations inside Walt Disney World Resort: Terralina Crafted Italian and Portabella. Levy was also a partner in the former Wildhorse Saloon and Fireworks factory location at Walt Disney World.

== Locations ==
As of 2025, Levy manages food service operations for facilities in all of the major North American sports leagues.

Levy's primary competitors in the sports industry include Aramark, Delaware North, Legends Hospitality, and Sodexo.

Levy also manages all food service operations at the Ravinia Festival in Highland Park, IL. Additionally, Levy owns multiple establishments inside Walt Disney World, and the Uber Arena in Berlin.

== Restaurants ==
In addition to Levy's role as a food & beverage provider at sports and entertainment venues, Levy operates several standalone restaurants and restaurants integrated into other businesses:

- The restaurants in the Chicago and New York American Girl stores, called "American Girl Cafés."
- Line & Lure Seafood Kitchen & Tap in Ridgefield, WA.
- Locations for Michael Jordan's Steak House in Chicago and The Mohegan Sun Casino in Connecticut and South Korea.
- Terralina Crafted Italian Restaurant, The Paddlefish Restaurant, and Parkside Market at Walt Disney World Resort in Florida.
- The River Roast and Jake Melnick's Corner Tap in Chicago.

Levy formerly ran the restaurant Maddon's Post as a partnership between Chef Tony Mantuano and former Chicago Cubs manager Joe Maddon, until it closed in 2019.
