= List of hotels in the United States =

This is a list of hotels in the United States, both current and defunct, organized by state. The list includes highly rated luxury hotels, skyscraper rated buildings, and historic hotels. It is not a directory of every chain or independent hotel building in the United States.

== Alabama ==
- Exchange Hotel, Montgomery
- Russel Erskine Hotel
- Victoryland

=== Mobile ===
- The Battle House Hotel
- Renaissance Riverview Plaza Hotel

==== Birmingham ====
- Redmont Hotel
- Russel Erskine Hotel
- Thomas Jefferson Hotel
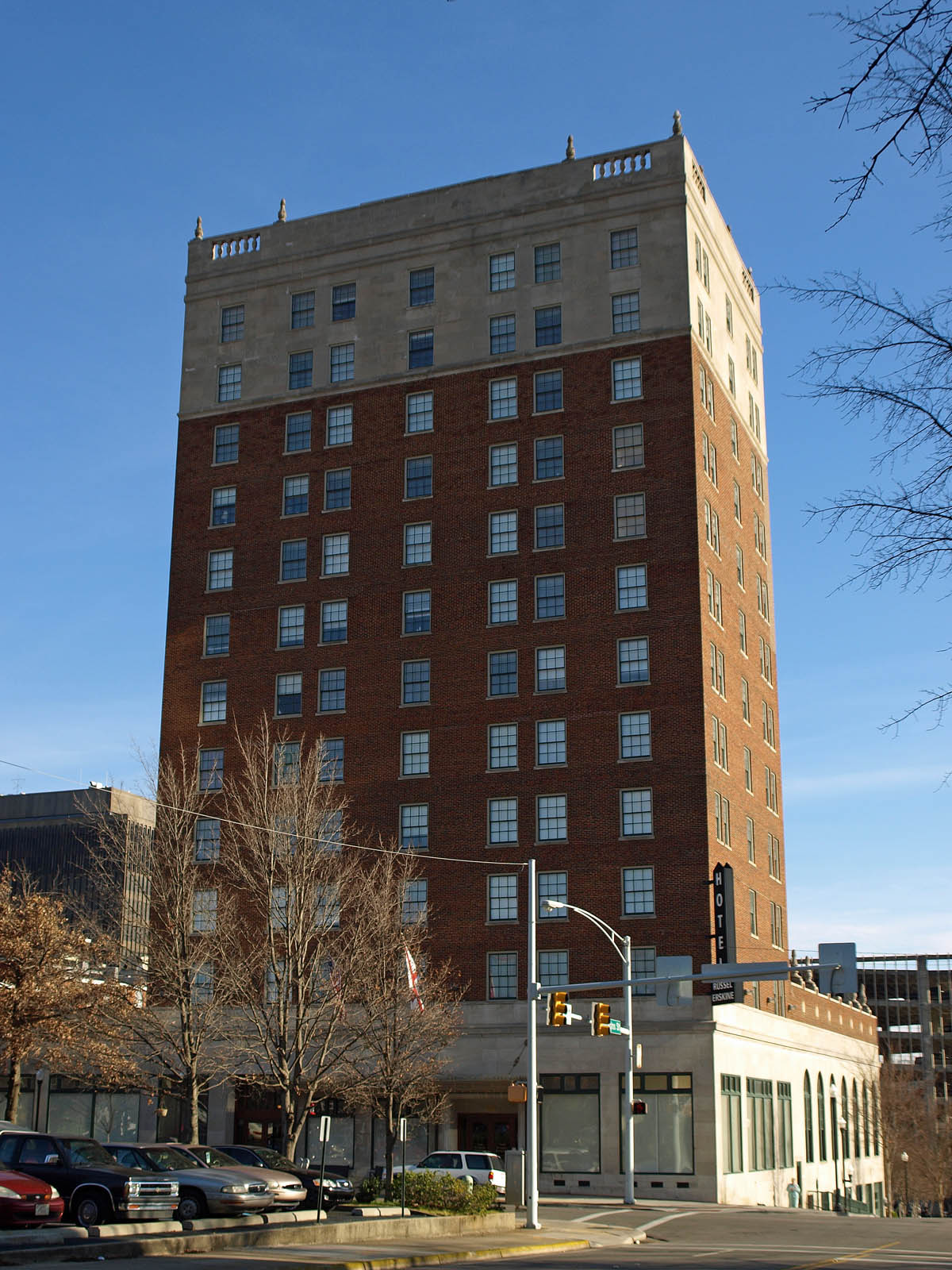
Russel Erskine Hotel

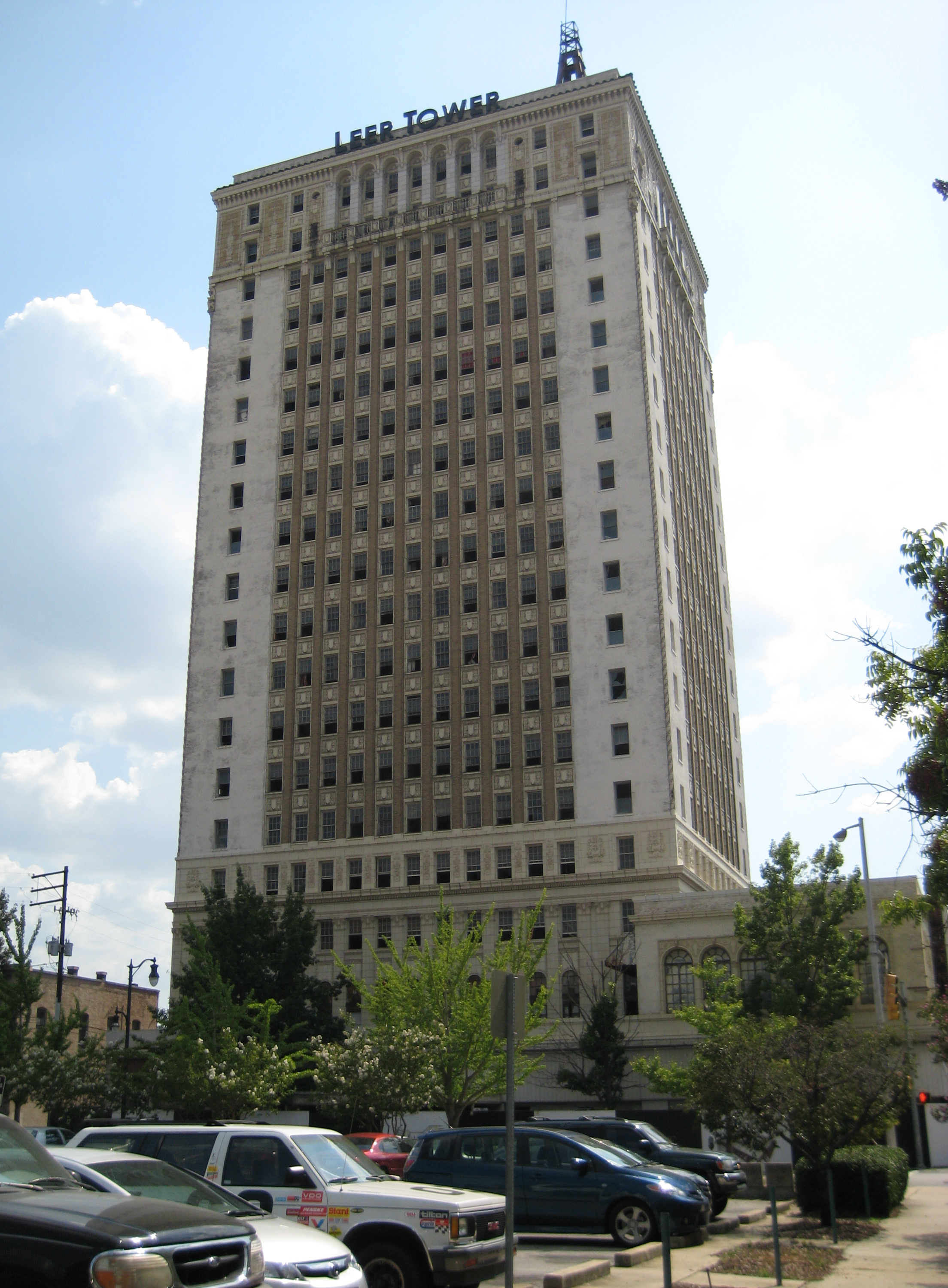
Thomas Jefferson Hotel

== Alaska ==
- Alaskan Hotel and Bar
- Bergmann Hotel
- The Lakefront Anchorage Hotel
- Van Gilder Hotel
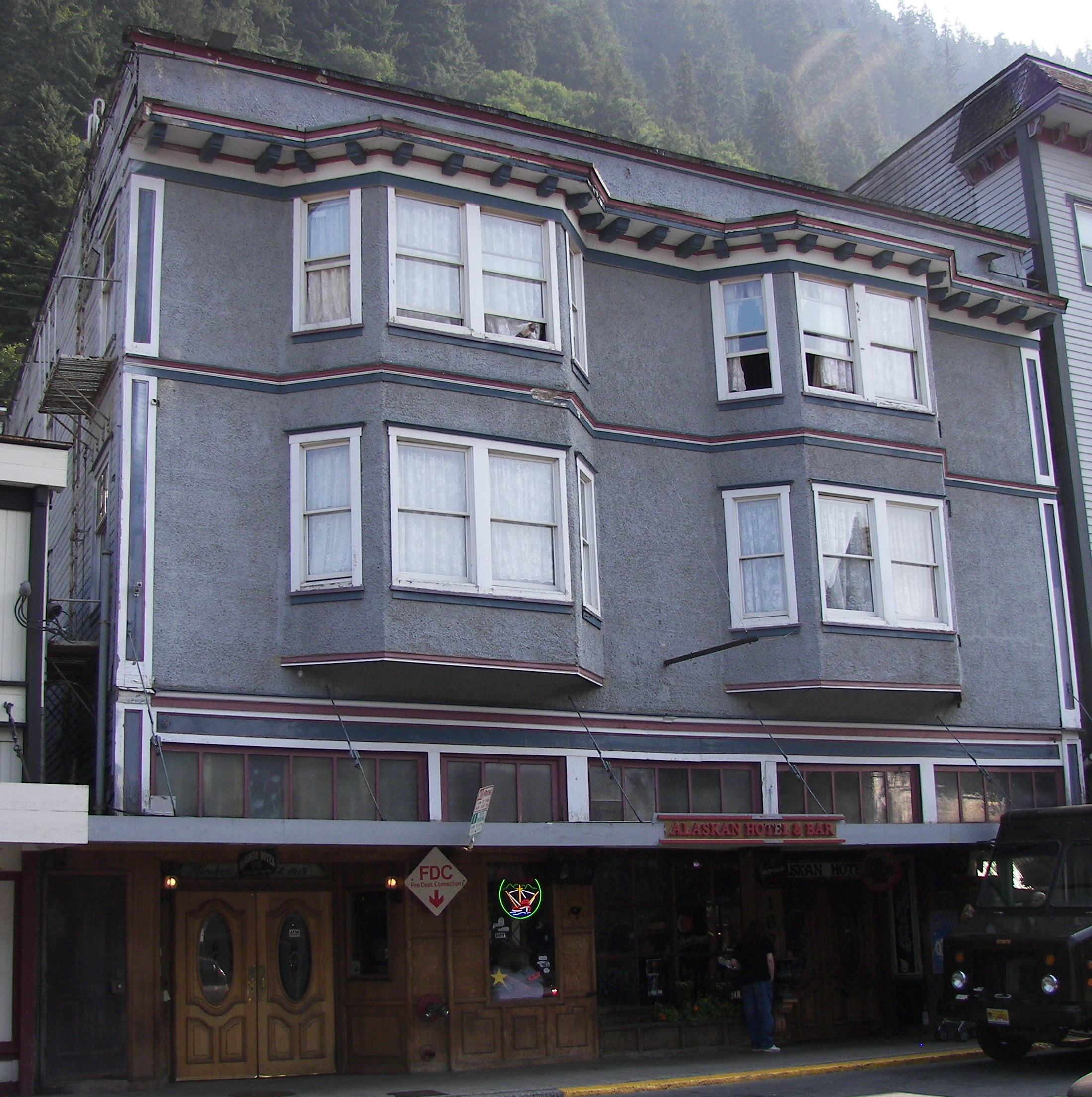
Alaskan Hotel and Bar

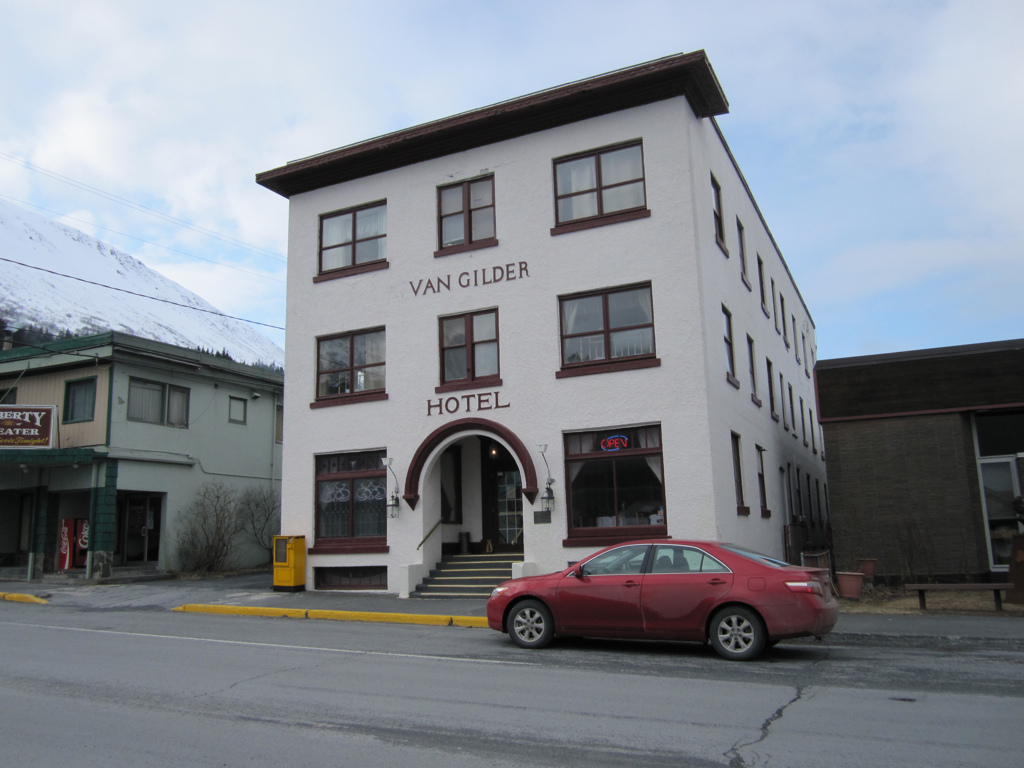
Van Gilder Hotel

== Arizona ==
- 6th Avenue Hotel-Windsor Hotel
- Arizona Biltmore Hotel
- Bowman Hotel
- Buena Vista Hotel
- Camelback Inn
- CityNorth
- CityScape (Phoenix)
- Cochise Hotel
- Copper Queen Hotel
- El Tovar Hotel
- Francisco Grande
- Grand Canyon Lodge†
- Harrah's Ak-Chin Casino
- Hermosa Inn
- Hotel Congress
- Hotel San Carlos
- Hotel Valley Ho
- Hyatt Regency Phoenix
- La Posada Hotel
- Mondrian Hotel
- Ox Bow Inn
- Phoenix City Square
- Phoenix Plaza
- Pioneer Hotel
- Professional Building
- Sheraton Phoenix Downtown
- Trump International Hotel & Residence
- Weatherford Hotel
- Westward Ho
- Wigwam Motel

† Destroyed by fire in July 2025

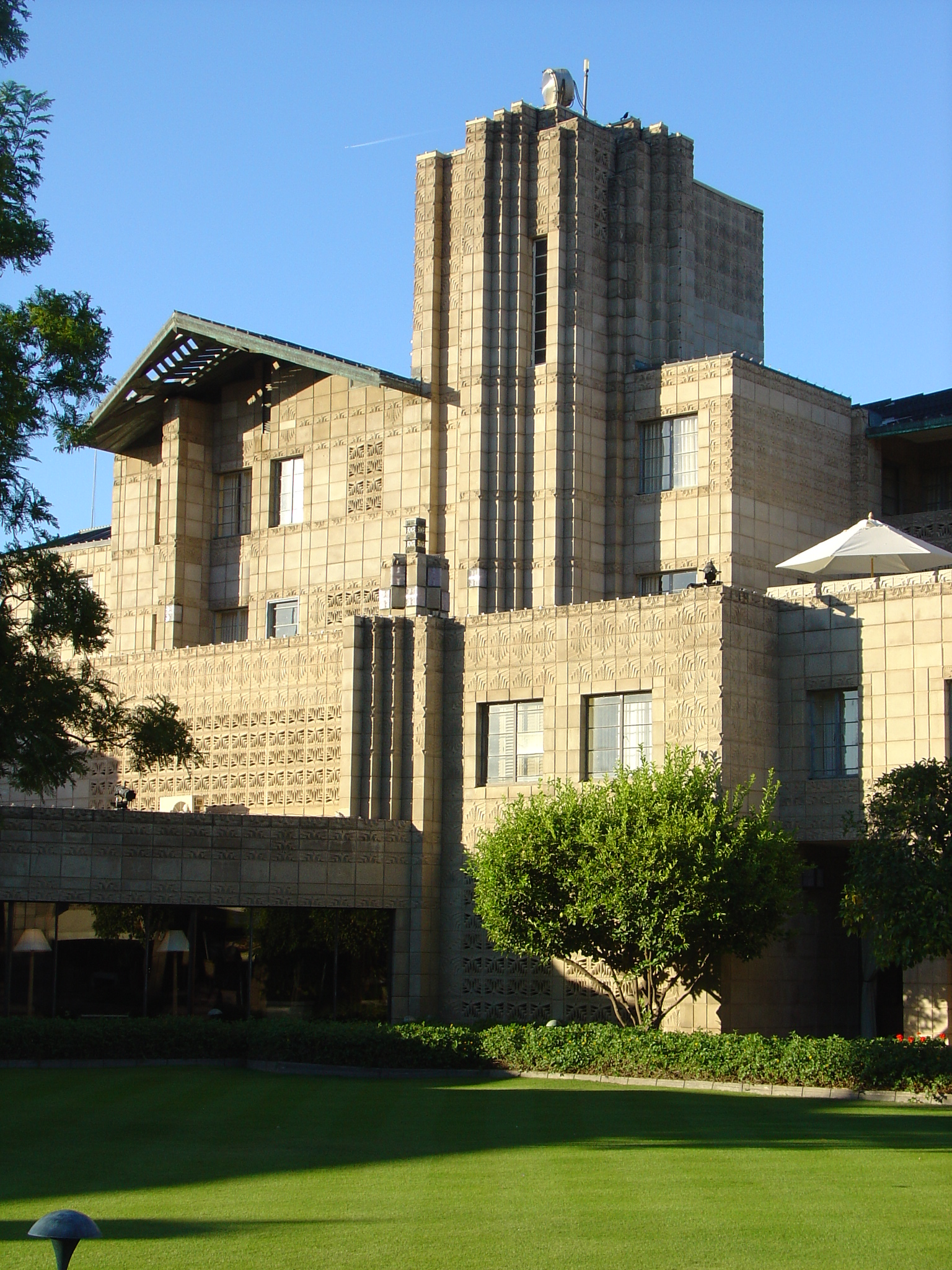
Arizona Biltmore Hotel

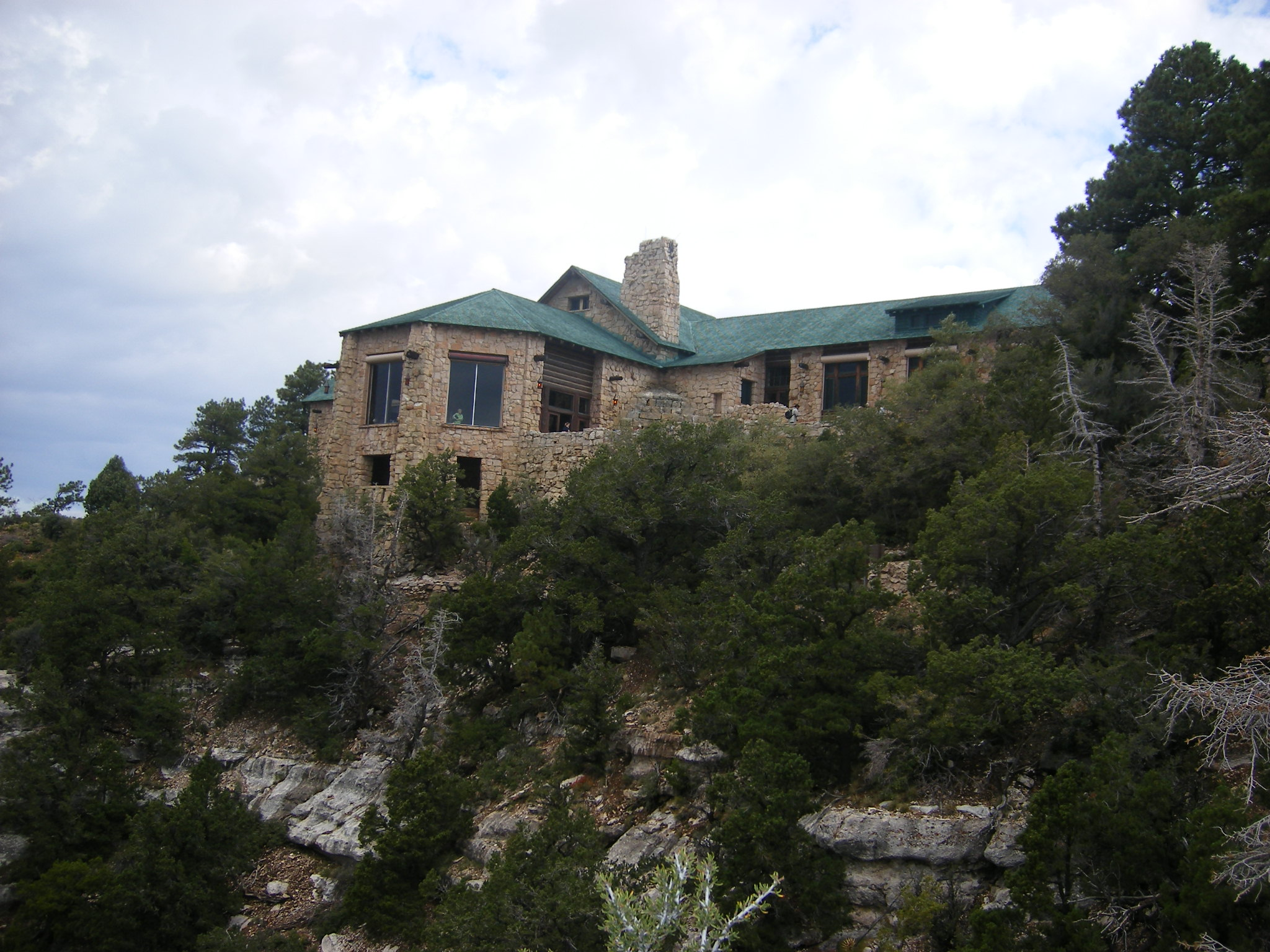
Grand Canyon Lodge

== Arkansas ==
- Albert Pike Residence Hotel
- Anthony House
- Arlington Hotel
- Bacon Hotel
- Commercial Hotel
- Crescent Hotel
- Dairy Hollow House
- Rusher Hotel
- Tall Pines Motor Inn
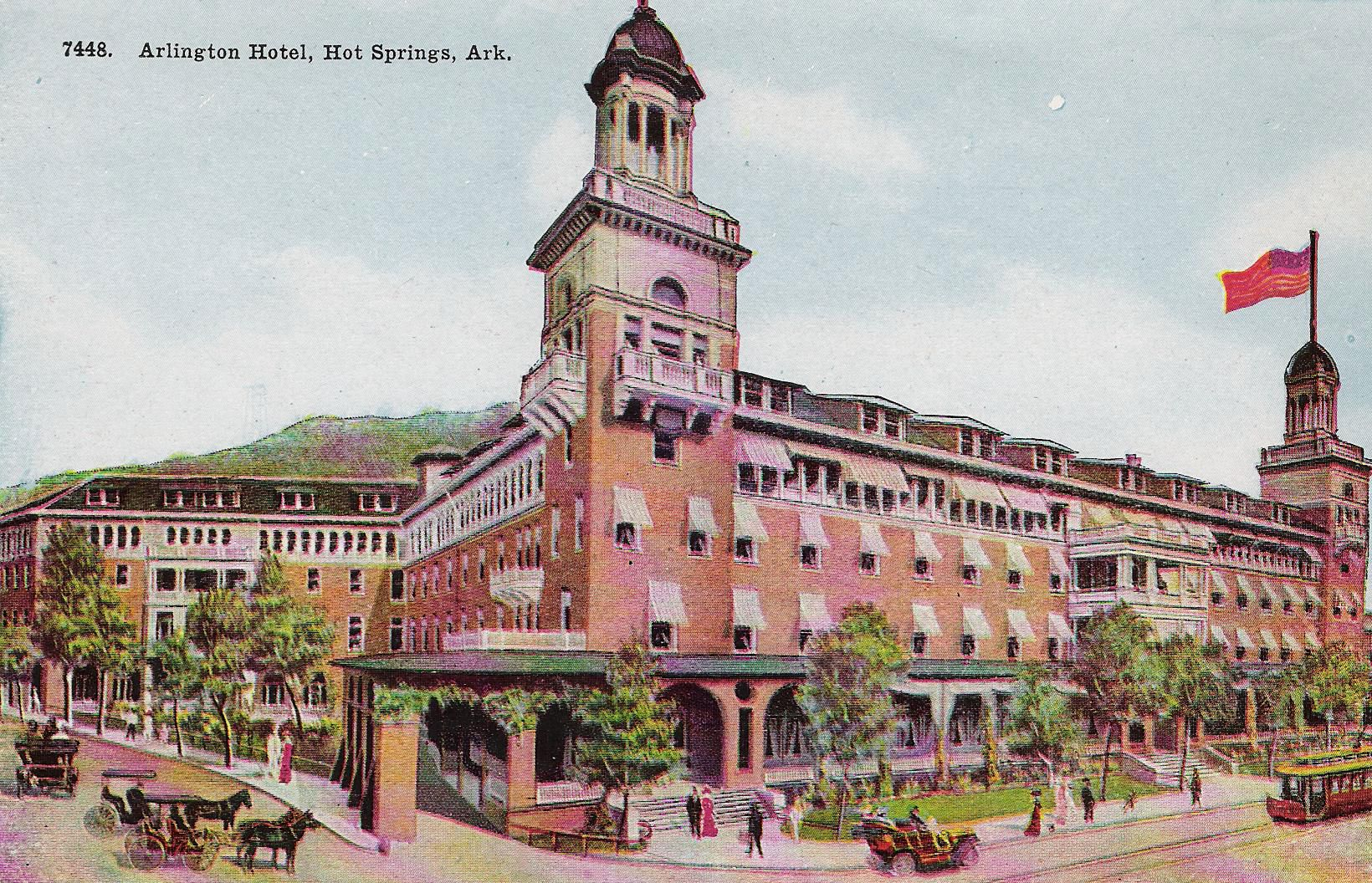
Arlington Hotel

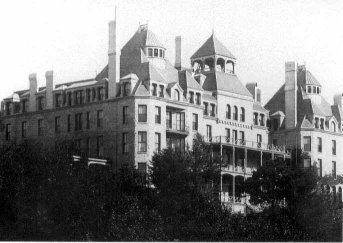
Crescent Hotel

== California ==
- Ahwahnee Hotel
- Angels Hotel
- Apple Valley Inn
- Arlington Hotel, Santa Barbara
- Aztec Hotel
- Balboa Bay Club & Resort
- Balboa Inn
- Beverly Wilshire Hotel
- C Street Inn
- Cal Neva Lodge & Casino
- Carlton Hotel
- Carter House Inn
- Casa del Desierto
- Casa del Mar hotel
- Cecil Hotel
- Claremont Resort
- Cloyne Court Hotel
- Colony Palms Hotel
- Culver Hotel
- Cypress Inn
- De Anza Hotel
- Deetjen's Big Sur Inn
- Disneyland Hotel
- Disney's Grand Californian Hotel & Spa
- Disney's Paradise Pier Hotel
- Drakesbad Guest Ranch
- Ducey's Bass Lake Lodge
- Dunbar Hotel
- East Brother Island Light
- El Garces Hotel
- El Carmelo Hotel
- Eureka Inn
- Fairmont San Jose
- Forest Hill Hotel, Pacific Grove
- Glen Tavern Inn
- Green Shutter Hotel
- The Hacienda, Milpitas
- Hayes Mansion
- Hilton Anaheim
- Hilton San Diego Bayfront
- Hilton Waterfront Beach Resort
- Holbrooke Hotel
- Hollywood Melrose Hotel
- Hollywood Plaza Hotel
- Hoover Hotel
- Horton Grand Hotel
- Hotel Arcata
- Hotel Chancellor
- Hotel Charlotte, Groveland
- Hotel del Coronado
- Hotel Green
- Hotel Léger
- Hotel Mac
- Hotel Montgomery
- Hotel Sainte Claire
- Hotel Vendome, San Jose
- Hotel Woodland
- The Keating Hotel
- Key Route Inn
- La Costa Resort and Spa
- La Quinta Resort and Club
- La Playa Hotel
- Los Laureles Lodge
- Lafayette Hotel & Suites in San Diego
- The Langham Huntington, Pasadena
- Madonna Inn
- Manchester Grand Hyatt Hotel
- Motel Inn of San Luis Obispo
- Murphys Hotel
- National Exchange Hotel
- New Hotel Carquinez
- Padre Hotel
- Park Hyatt Resort Aviara
- Piedras Blancas Motel
- Pierpont Inn
- Pine Inn
- Raymond Hotel
- Ritz-Carlton Half Moon Bay
- Robinson Hotel
- Roy's Motel and Café
- San Diego Marriott Hotel and Marina
- San Gorgonio Inn
- Santa Barbara Biltmore
- Shutters on the Beach Hotel
- Southern Hotel, Perris
- Sovereign Hotel
- Stagecoach Inn
- Sunset Tower
- Superior Oil Company Building
- Sycamore Mineral Springs Resort
- Mission Inn
- The Lodge at Pebble Beach
- Thunder Valley Casino Resort
- U.S. Grant Hotel
- Venetian Court
- Wagon Wheel
- Wawona Hotel
- The Westin San Diego
- Wigwam Motel
- Yosemite Lodge at the Falls
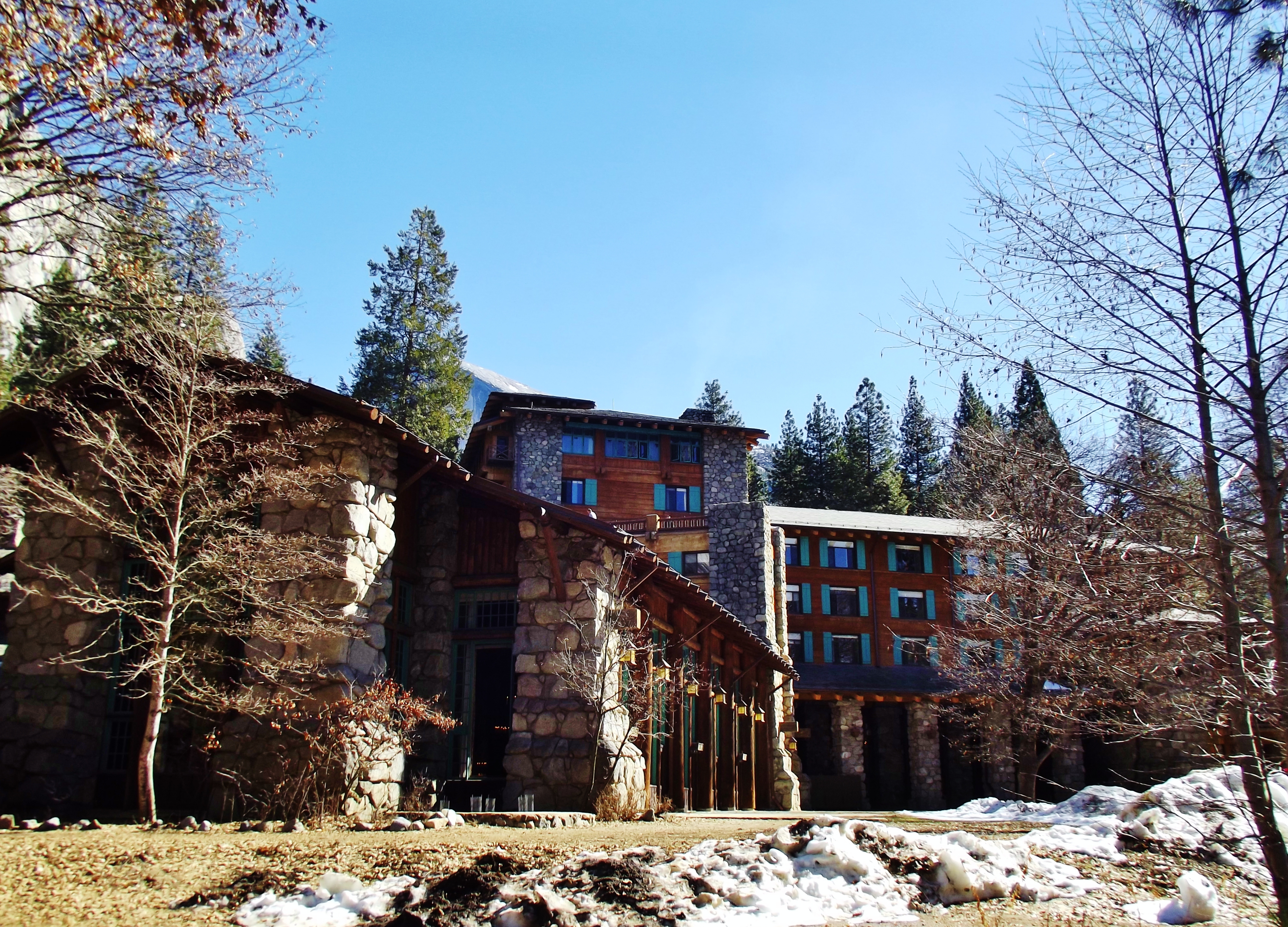
Ahwahnee Hotel

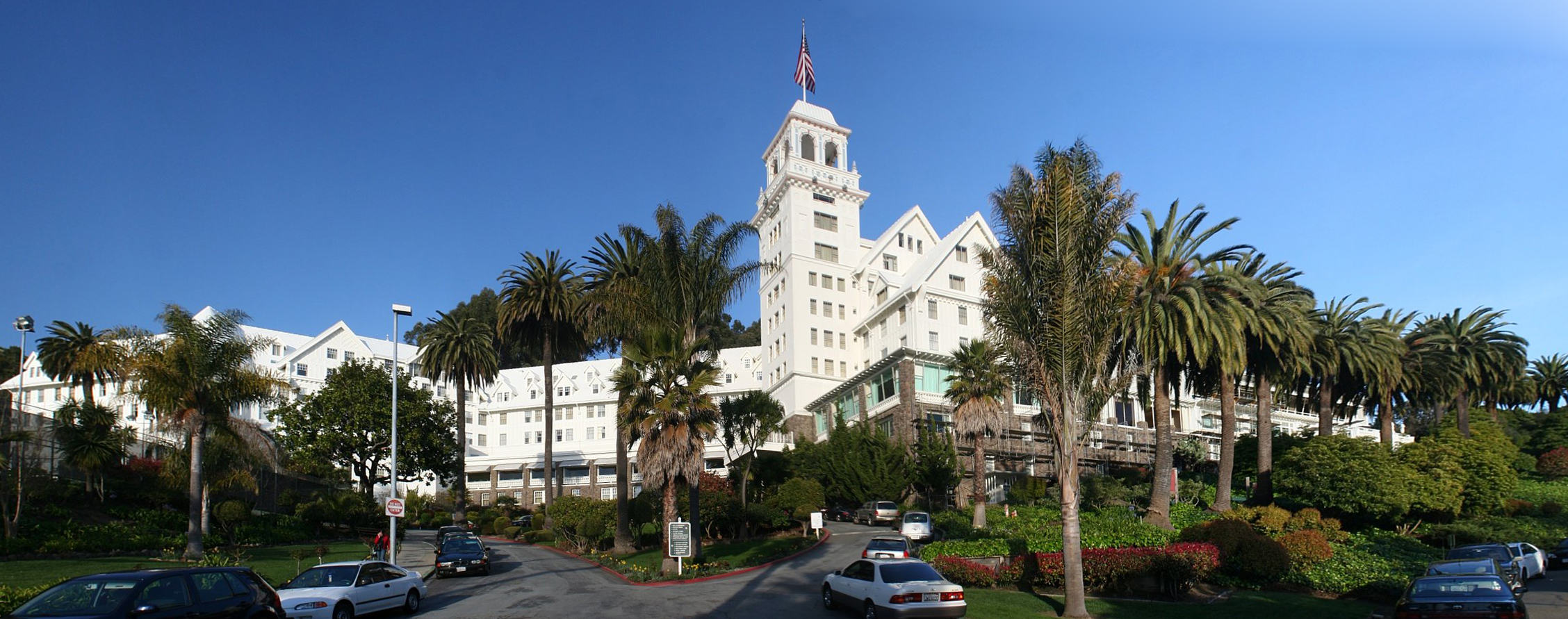
Claremont Resort

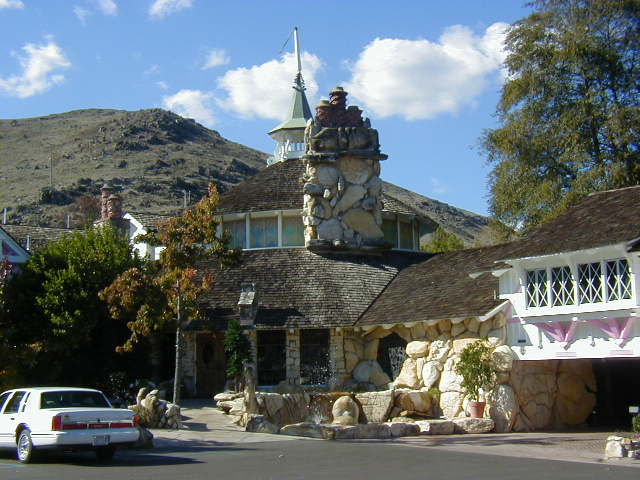
Madonna Inn

=== Los Angeles County ===
- Alan Hotel, established 1942, demolished 1986
- Ambassador Hotel, opened 1921, demolished 2005
- Andaz West Hollywood, opened 1963 as the Gene Autry
- Aztec Hotel, existing
- Bella Union Hotel, constructed 1835, demolished 1940
- Beverly Hills Hotel, opened 1912
- Beverly Hilton Hotel, opened 1953
- Beverly Wilshire Hotel, completed 1928
- Boyle Hotel – Cummings Block, existing
- Century Plaza Hotel, opened 1966
- Chateau Marmont, built 1927
- Culver Hotel, built 1924
- Downtown Standard Hotel, completed 1956, reopened as hotel 2002
- Dunbar Hotel, opened 1928 as the Dunbar, now an apartment building
- Fremont Hotel, opened 1902, demolished 1955
- Halifax Hotel, demolished
- Hilton Santa Monica Hotel & Suites
- Hollywood Hotel, razed 1956
- Hollywood Melrose Hotel, built 1927
- Hotel Bel-Air, opened 1946
- Hotel Chancellor, built 1924, now an apartment building
- Knickerbocker Hotel, built 1925, now an apartment building
- Kyoto Grand Hotel and Gardens, opened 1977 as the New Otani
- Millennium Biltmore Hotel, opened 1923
- Mondrian Hotel, built 1959
- Monte Vista Hotel, built 1887, demolished 1964
- Park Plaza Hotel, built 1920s
- The Peninsula Beverly Hills
- Pico House, built 1869–70, exists as historic landmark
- Raffles L'Ermitage, built 1970s
- Roosevelt Hotel, opened 1927
- Sheraton Town House/Sheraton West, opened 1929
- Sportsmen's Lodge, operating since the 1880s
- Standard Hotel, opened 1999
- Sunset Marquis Hotel, existing
- Sunset Tower, opened 1931
- Superior Oil Company Building, completed 1956
- The Town House, built 1929
- Westin Bonaventure Hotel, constructed 1974–76
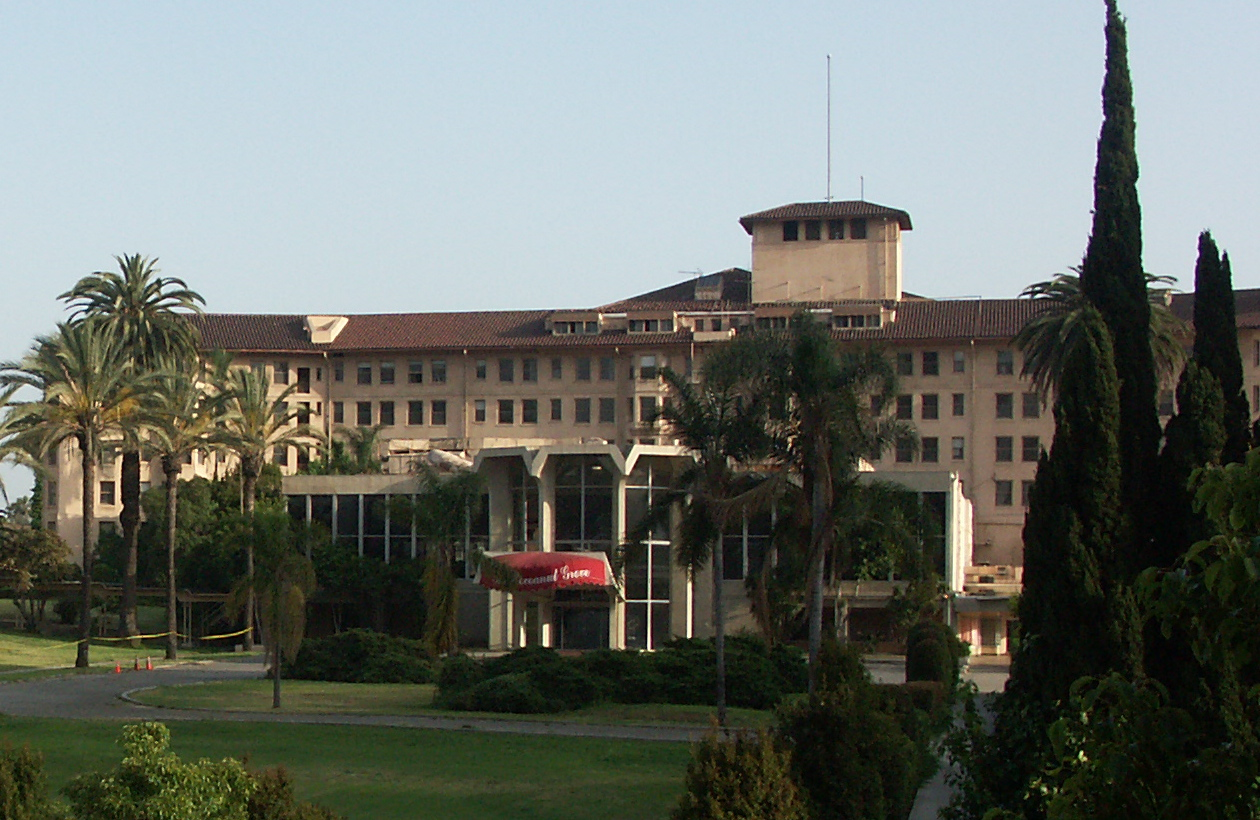
Ambassador Hotel

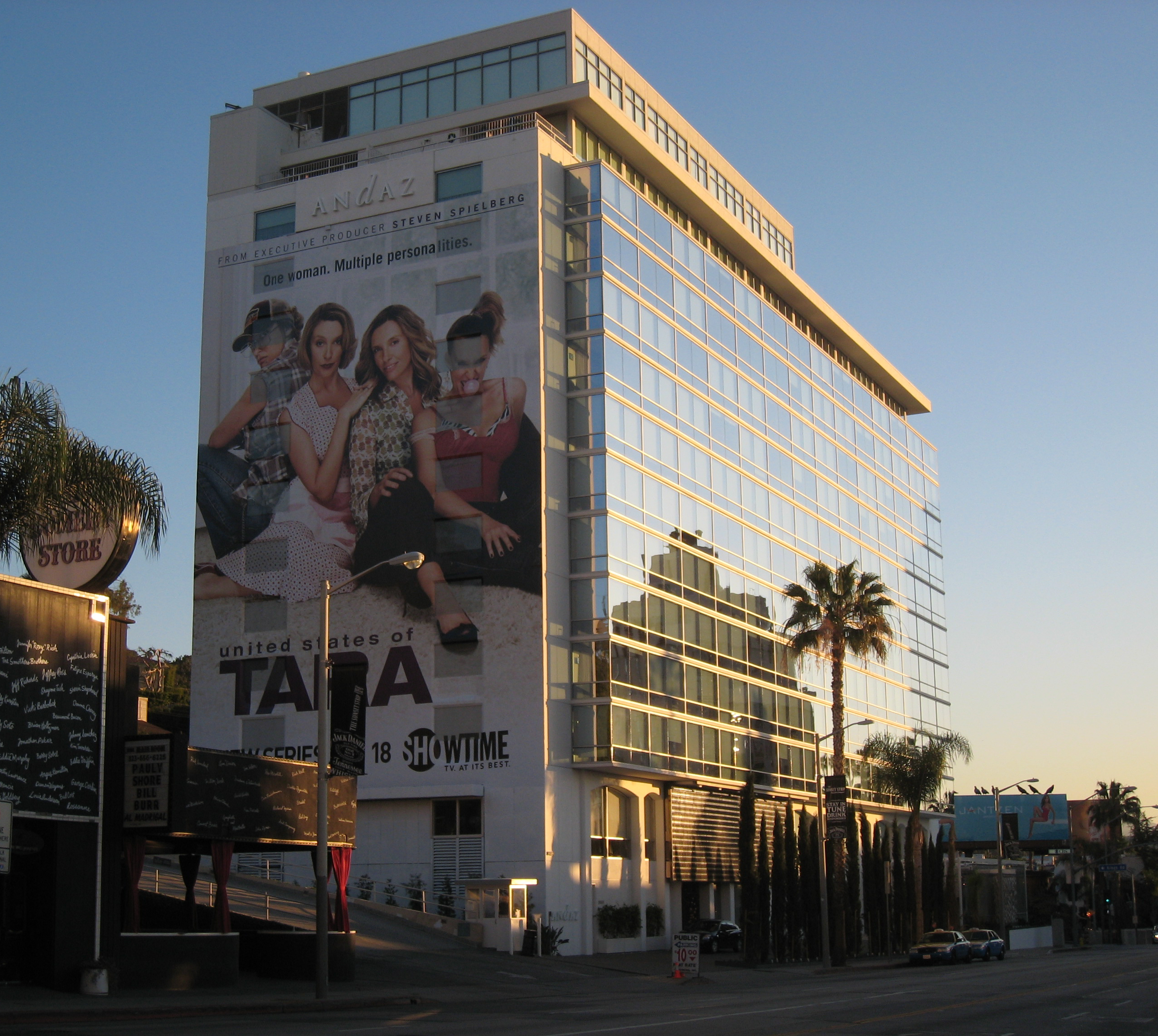
Andaz West Hollywood

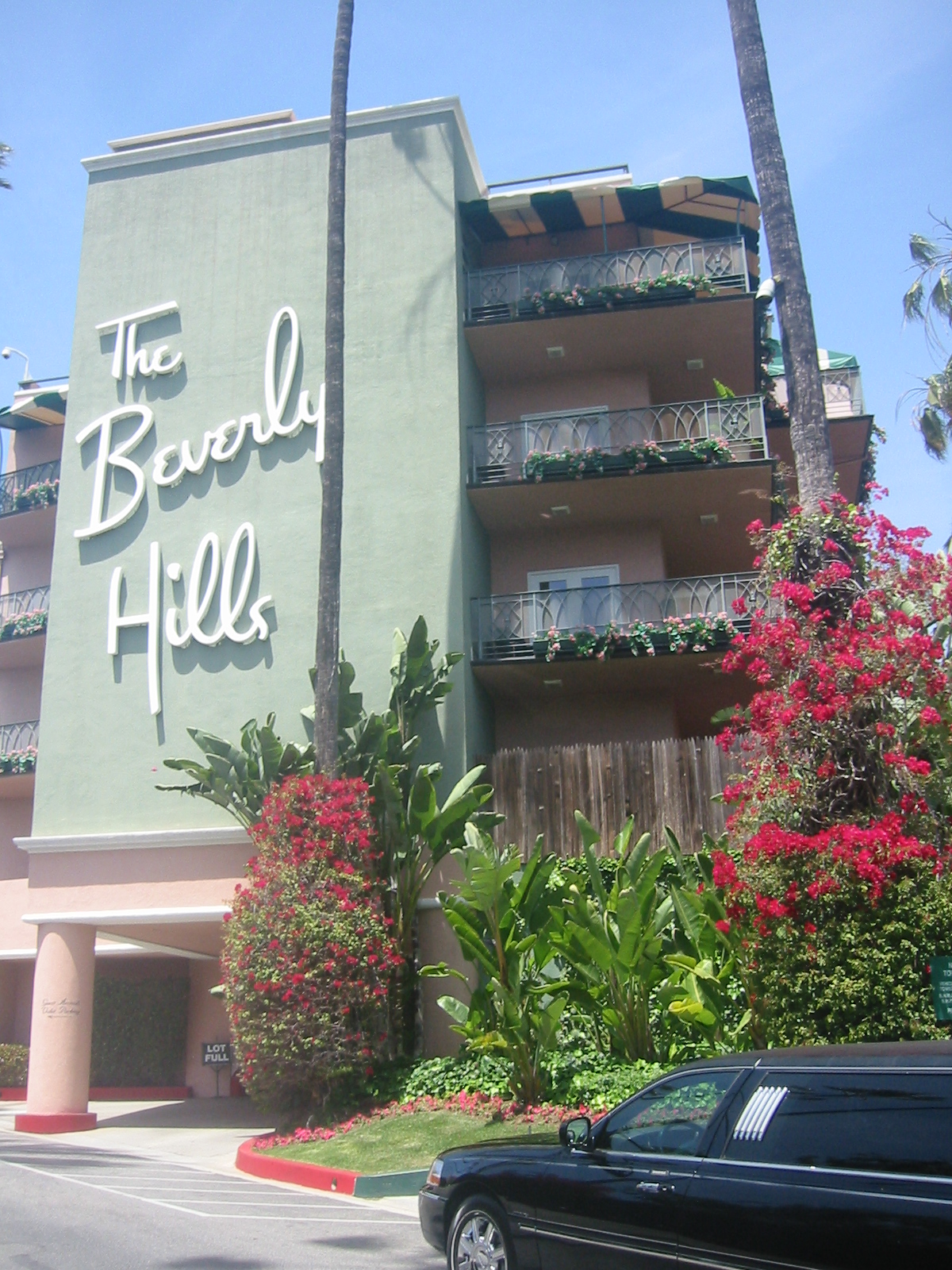
Beverly Hills Hotel

=== San Francisco ===
- Ambassador Hotel
- Clift
- Fairmont San Francisco
- Four Seasons Hotel, San Francisco
- Grand Hyatt San Francisco
- Hilton San Francisco Union Square
- Hotel des Arts
- Hotel Majestic
- Hotel Union Square
- Hugo Hotel
- Huntington Hotel
- Hyatt Regency San Francisco
- I-Hotel
- InterContinental San Francisco
- JW Marriott San Francisco Union Square
- Le Méridien San Francisco
- Mandarin Oriental, San Francisco
- Mark Hopkins Hotel
- Palace Hotel
- Palace Hotel Residential Tower
- Park Central Hotel San Francisco
- Queen Anne Hotel
- The Red Victorian
- San Francisco Marriott Marquis
- Stanford Court Hotel
- W San Francisco
- Westin St. Francis
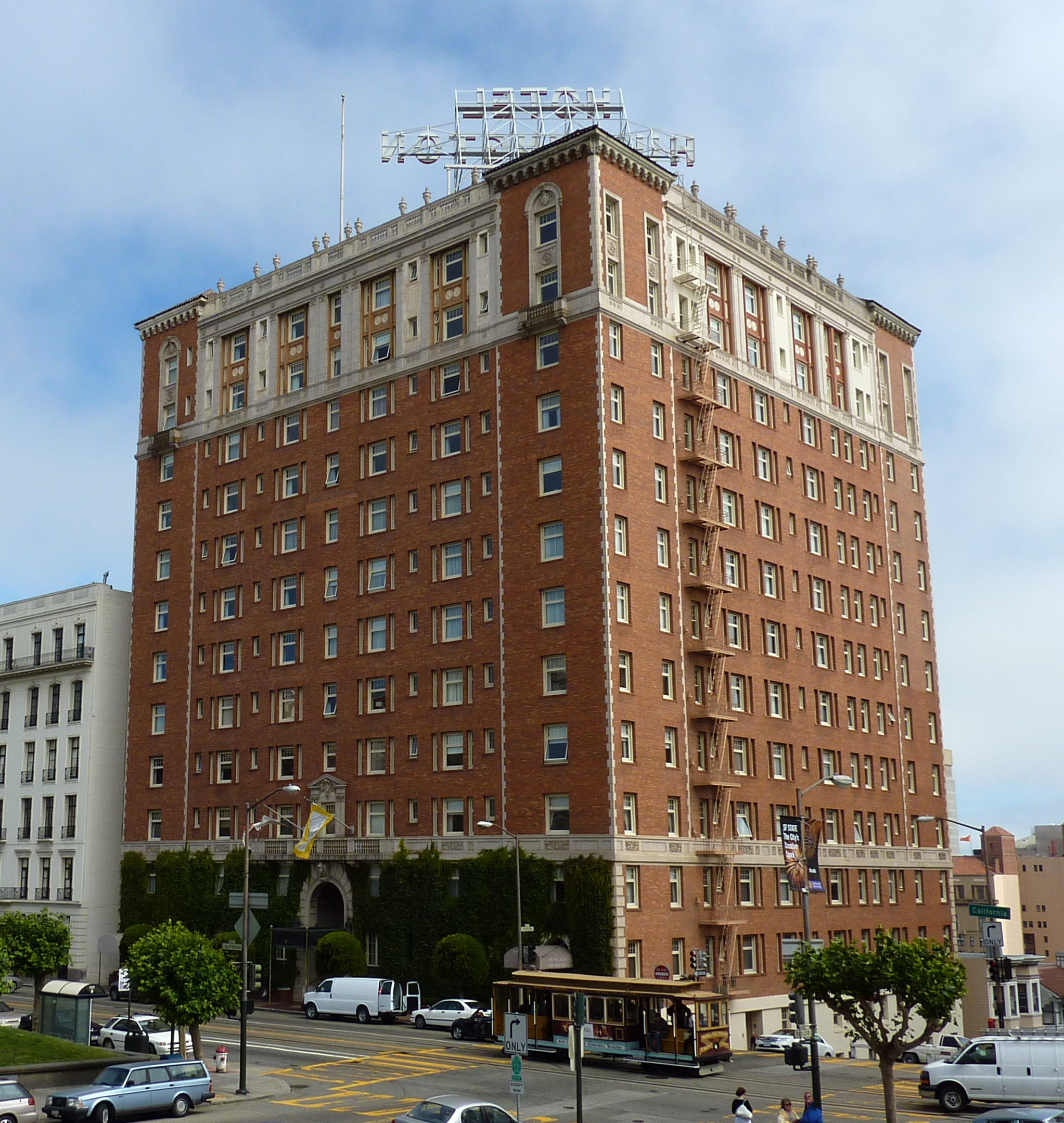
Huntington Hotel

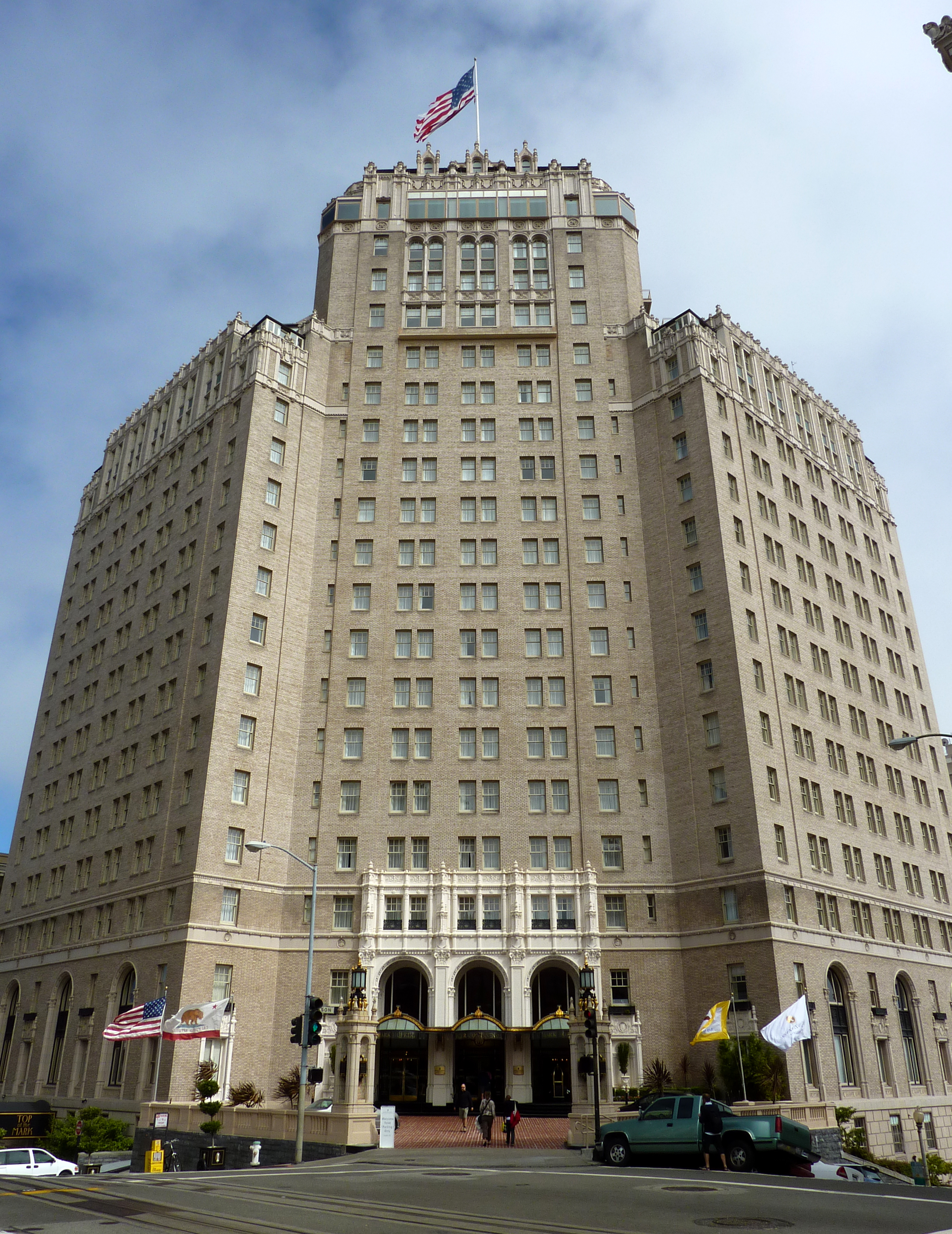
Mark Hopkins Hotel

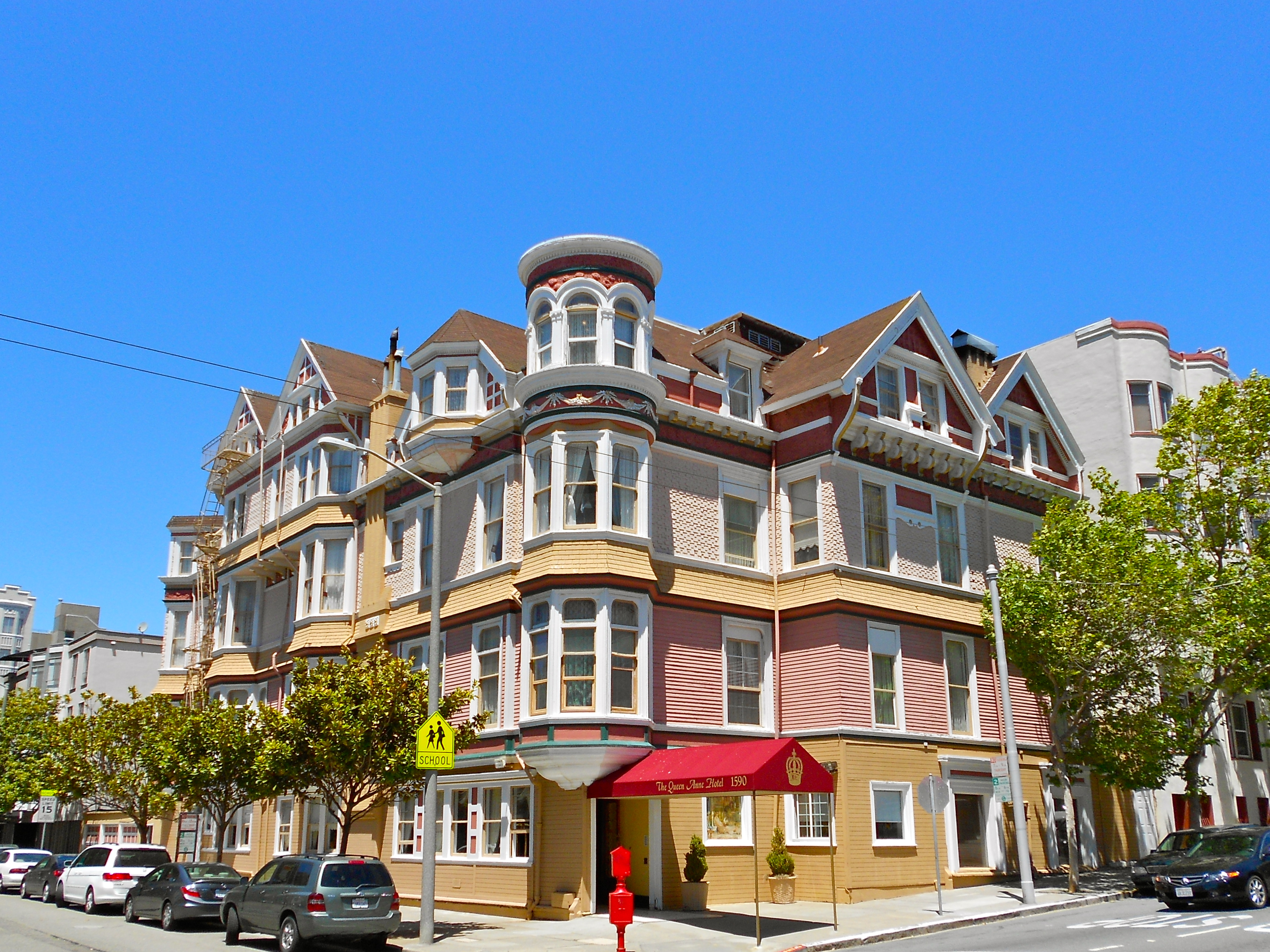
Queen Anne Hotel

== Colorado ==
- Antlers Hilton Hotel
- Astor House
- Beaumont Hotel
- The Broadmoor
- Glenisle
- Grand Lake Lodge
- Hotel Boulderado
- Hotel Colorado
- Hotel Jerome
- Kauffman House
- Pacific Hotel
- Redstone Inn
- St. Elmo Hotel
- The Stanley Hotel
- Teller House
- Victor Hotel
- Western Hotel
- Winks Panorama
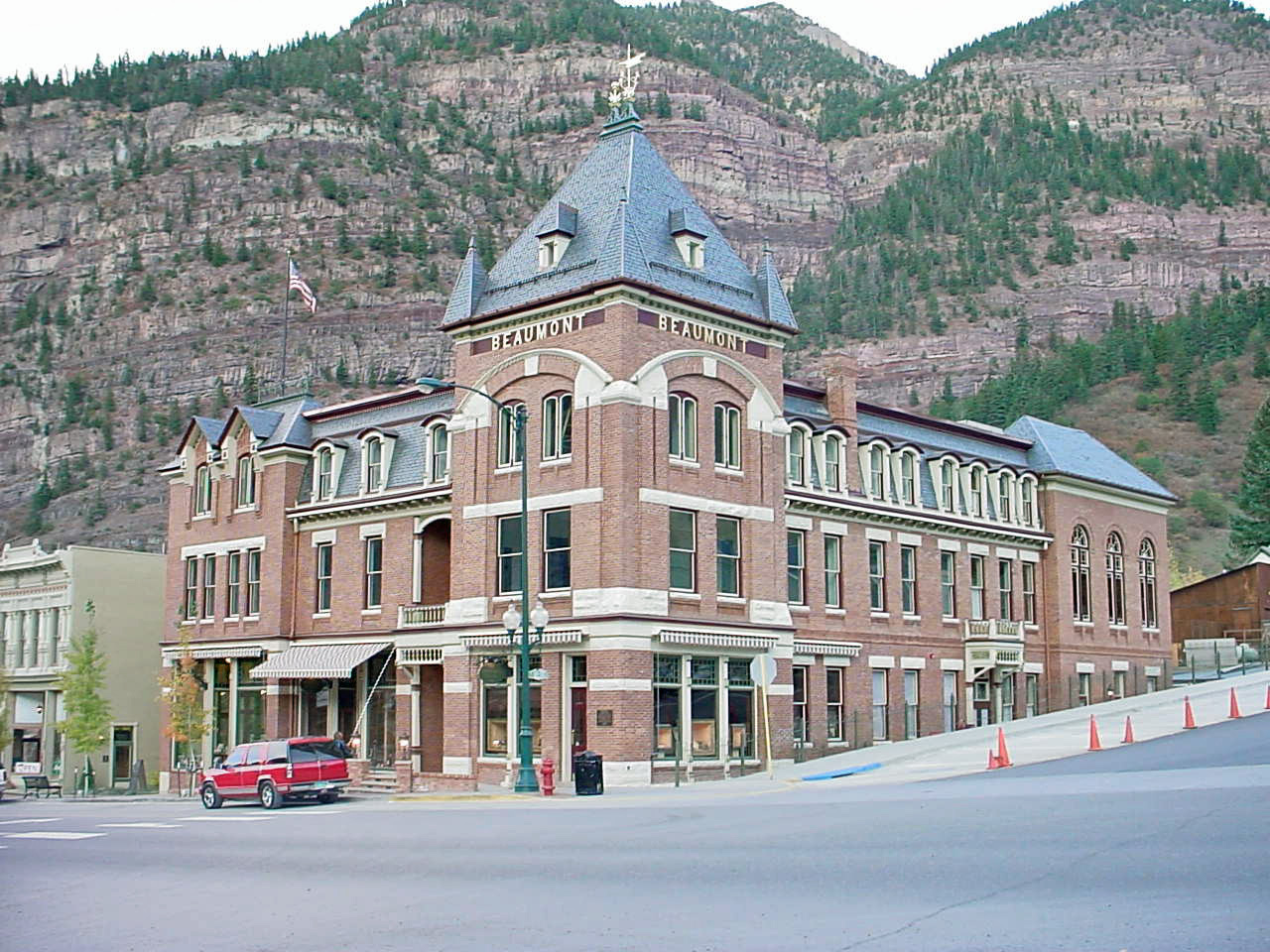
Beaumont Hotel (Ouray, Colorado)

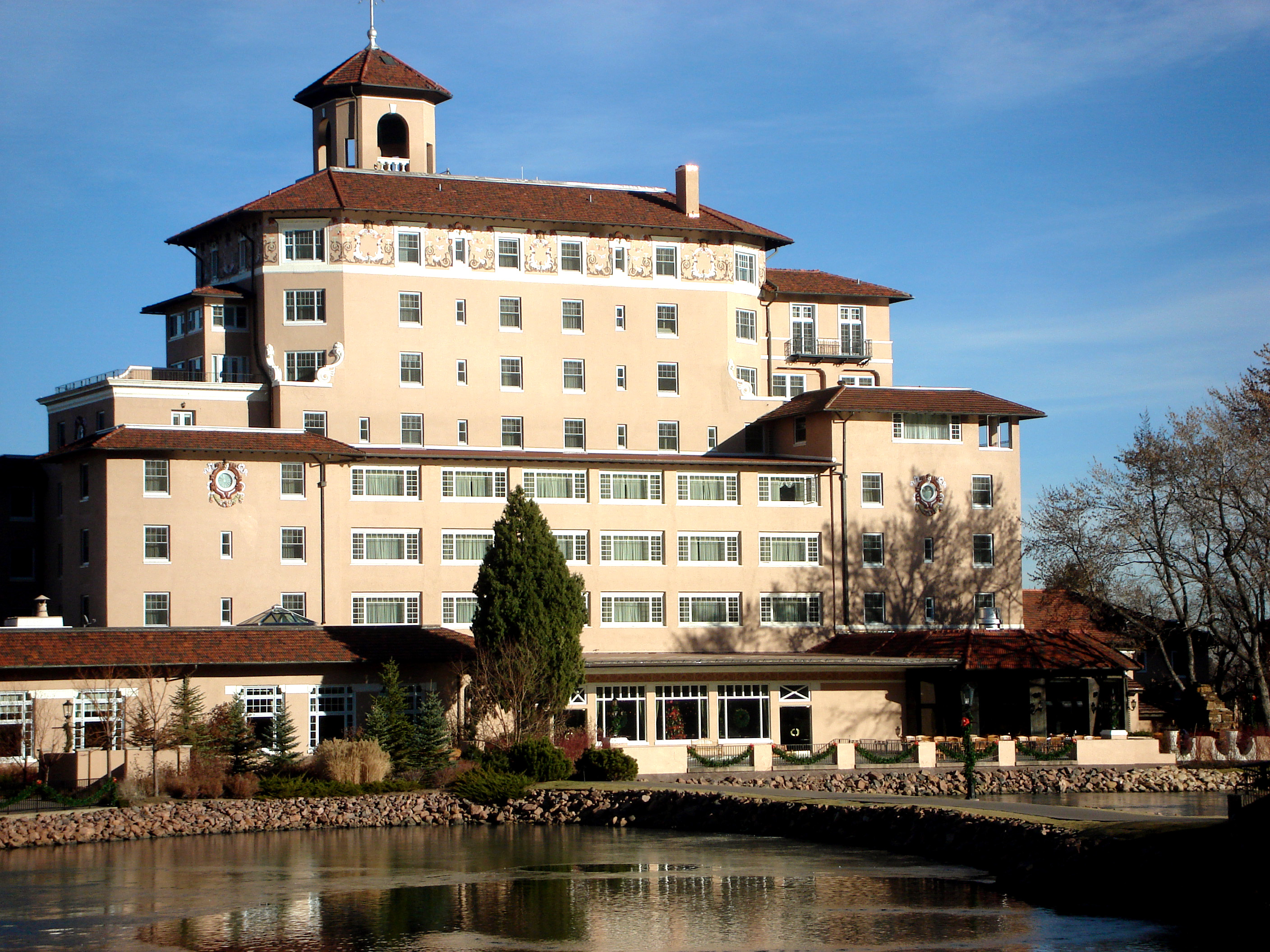
The Broadmoor

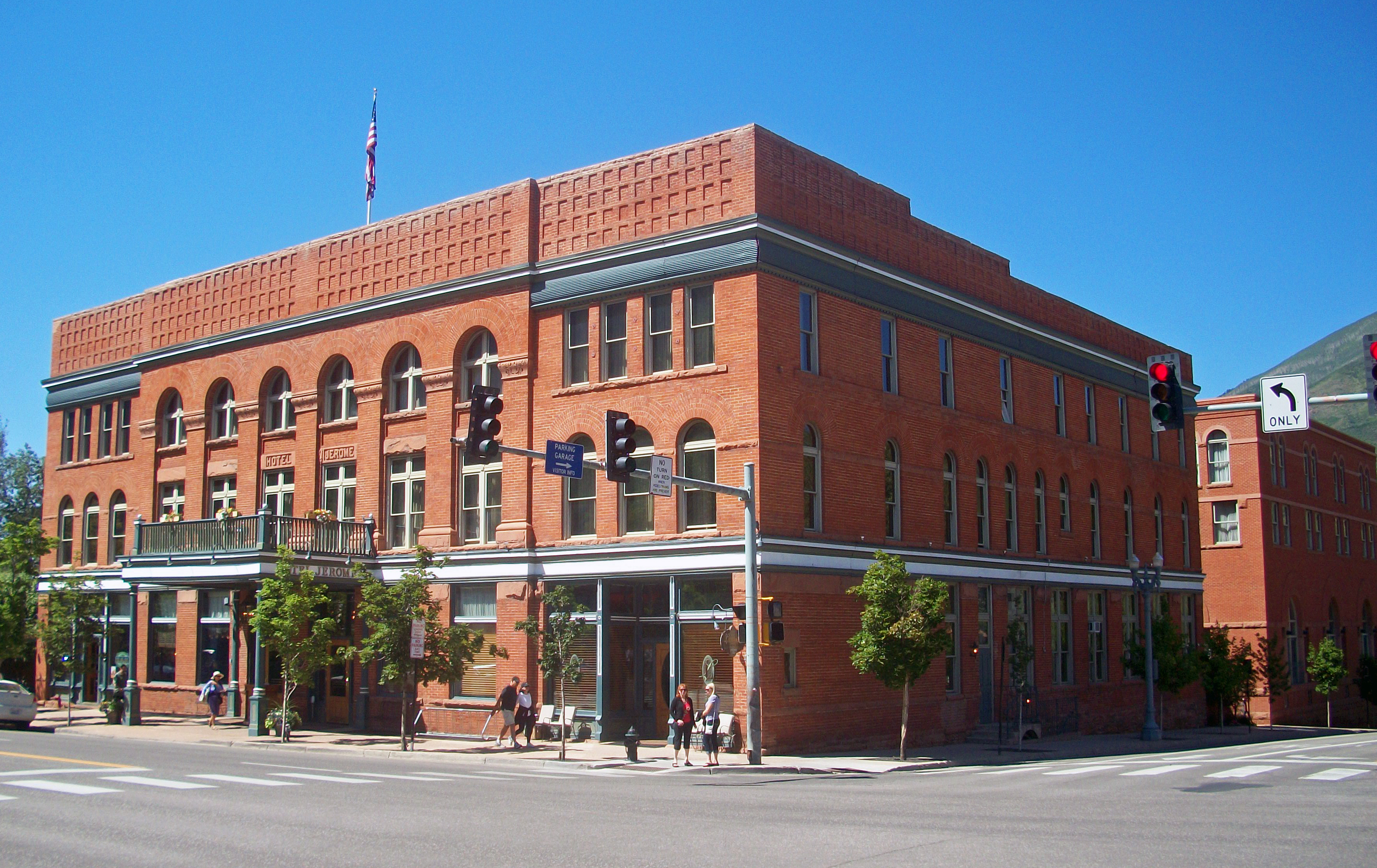
Hotel Jerome

=== Denver ===
- Brown Palace Hotel
- Courtyard Denver Downtown
- The Curtis
- Denver Marriott City Center
- Four Seasons Hotel Denver
- Hyatt Regency Denver at the Colorado Convention Center
- Regency Hotel
- Ritz-Carlton Denver
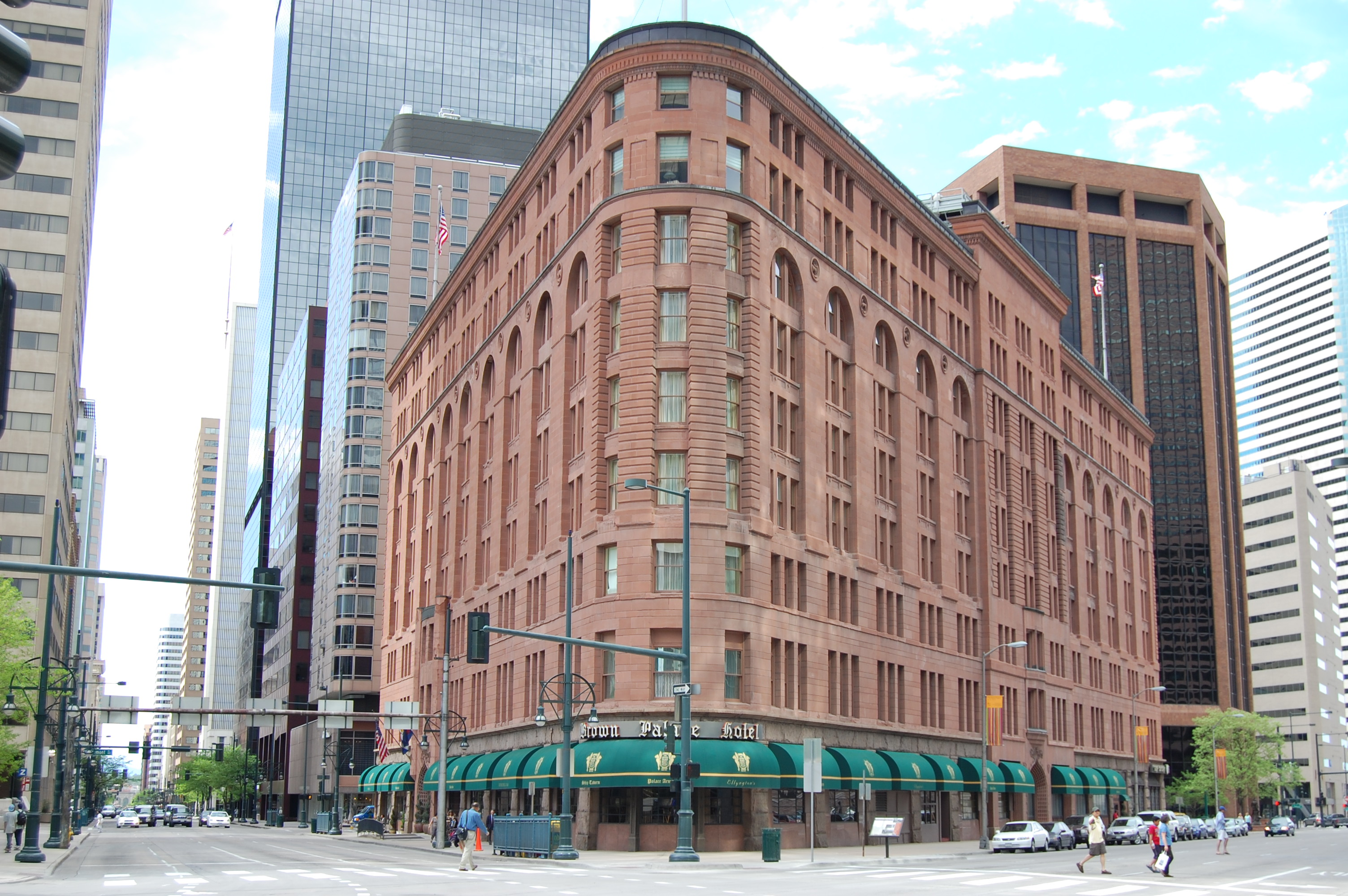
Brown Palace Hotel

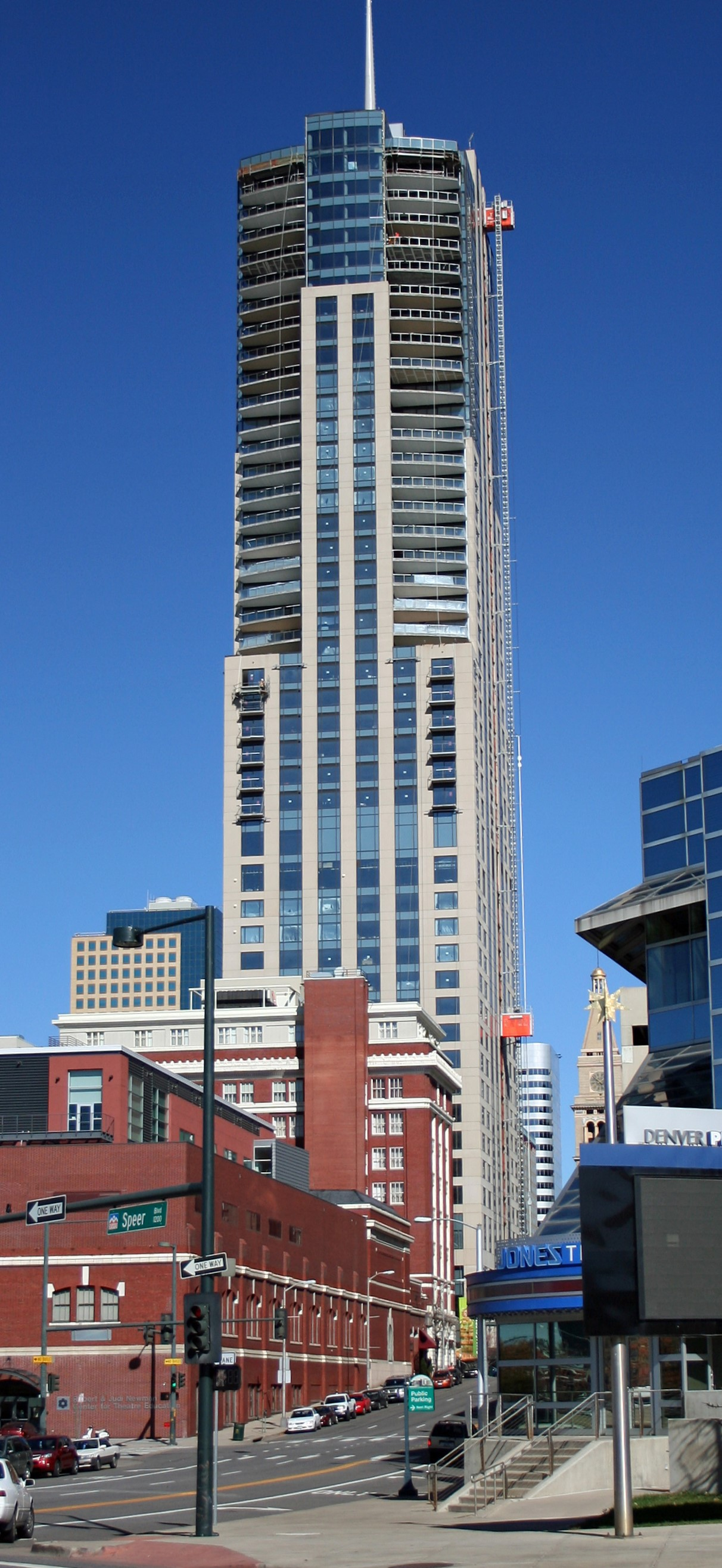
Four Seasons Hotel Denver

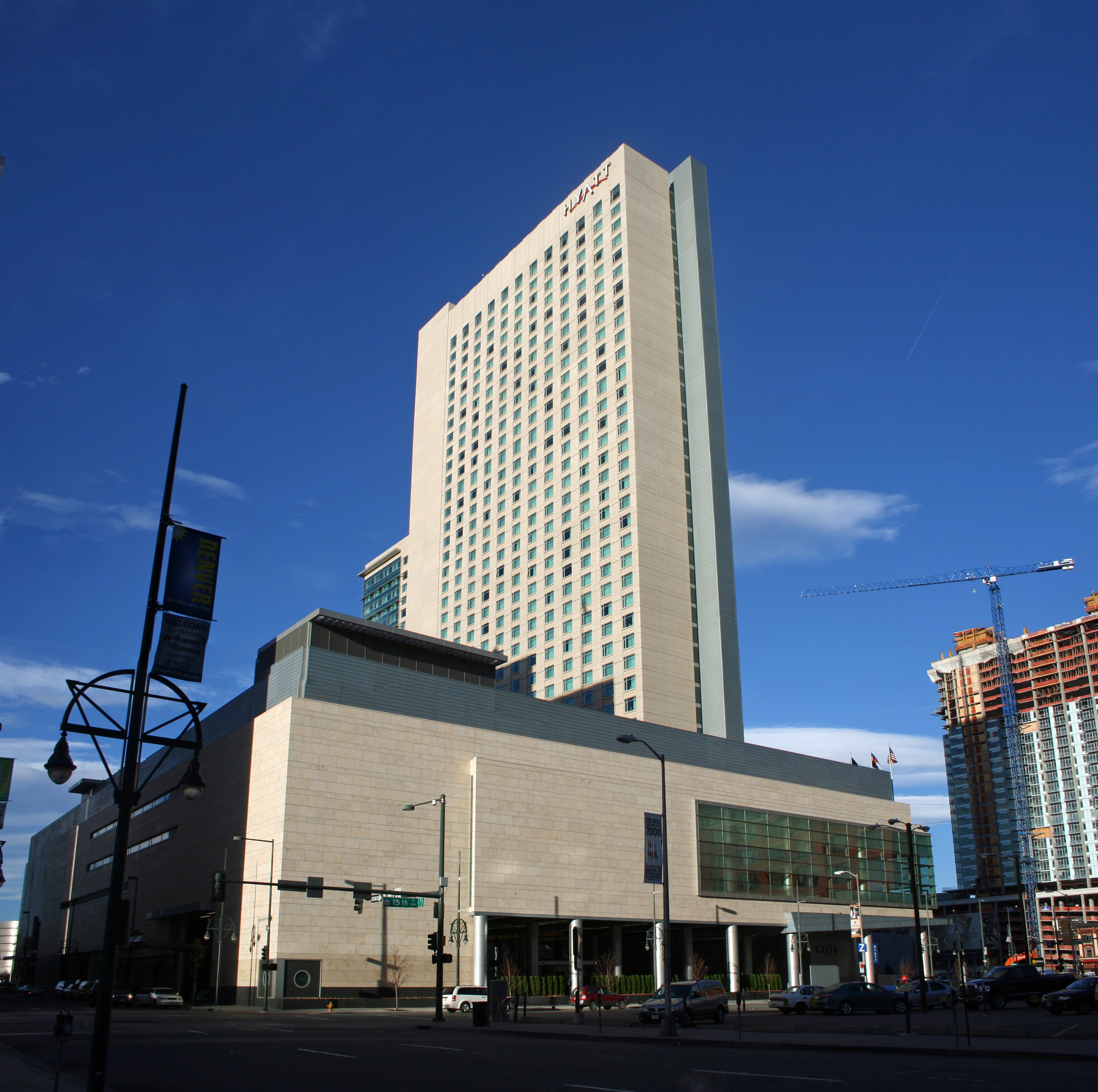
Hyatt Regency Denver at the Colorado Convention Center

== Connecticut ==
- Dorrance Inn
- Elton Hotel
- Foxwoods Resort Casino
- The Griswold Inn
- Hampton Inn
- Hotel Bond
- Lighthouse Inn
- Mohegan Sun
- Winvian
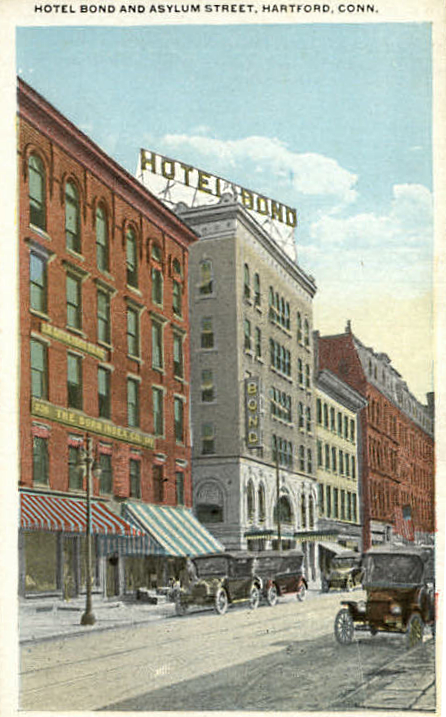
Hotel Bond, ca 1910s

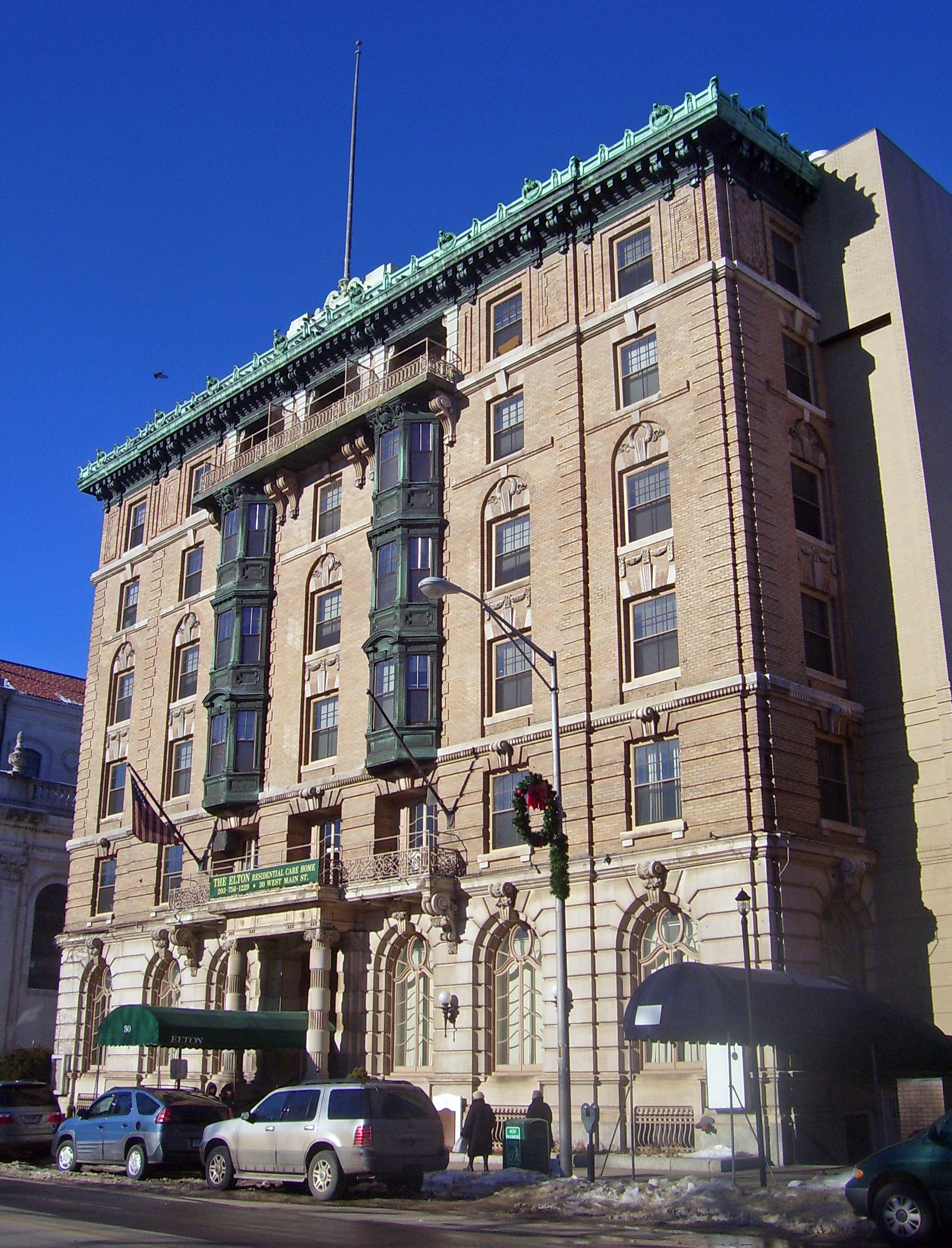
Elton Hotel

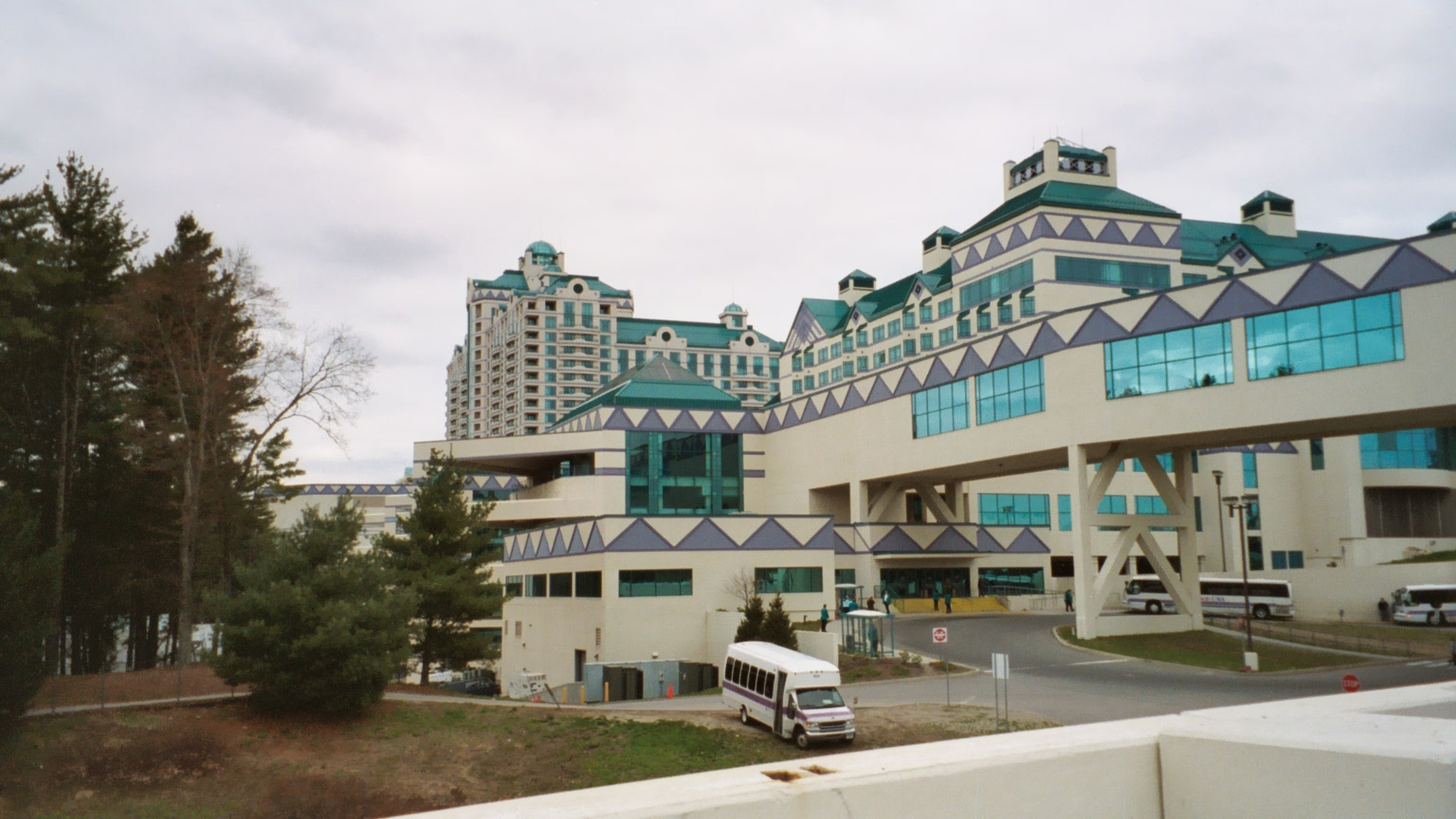
Foxwoods Resort Casino

== Delaware ==
- Deer Park Tavern
- Dover Downs
- DuPont Building
- Robinson House
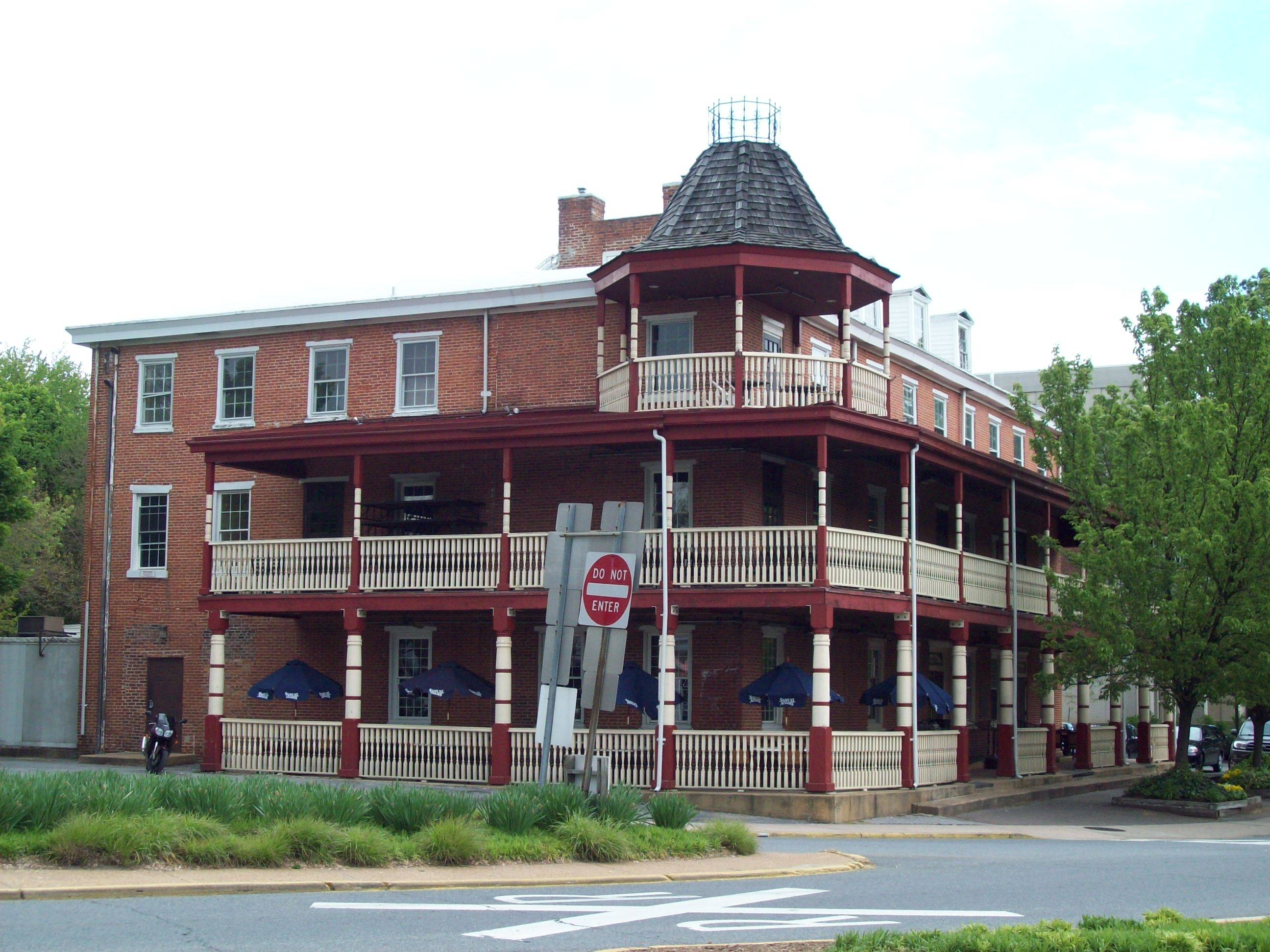
Deer Park Tavern

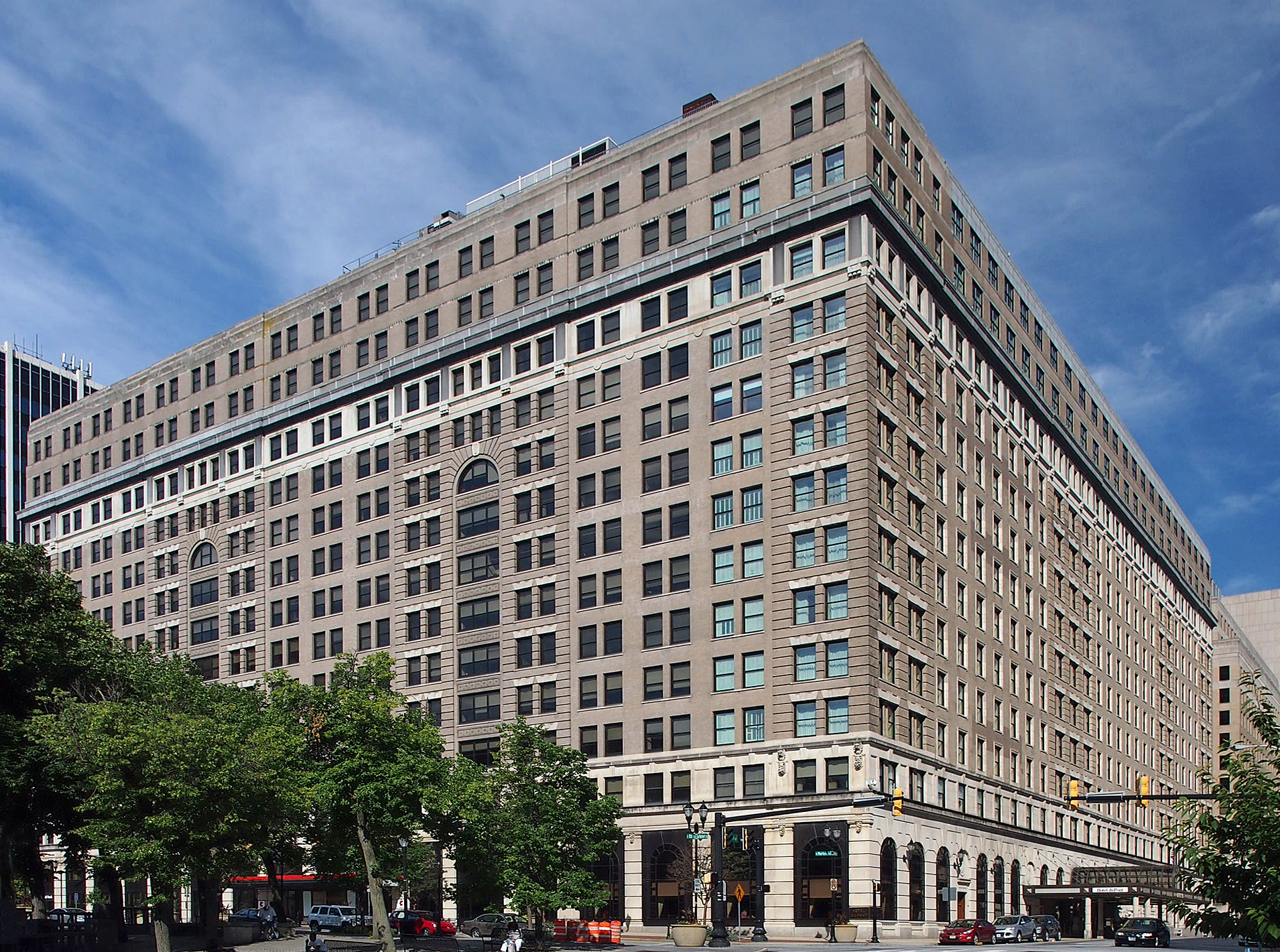
DuPont Building

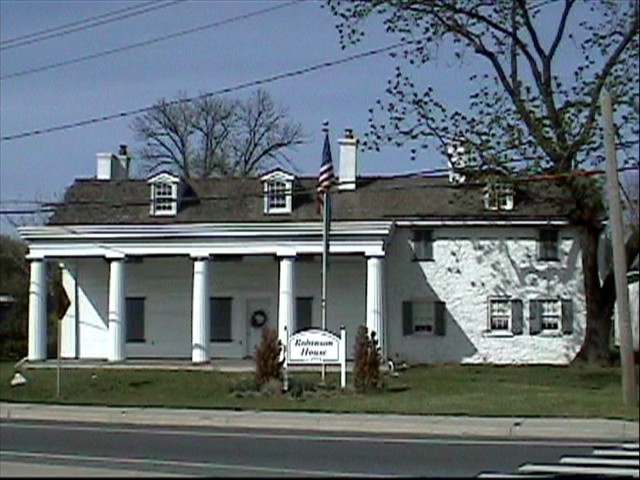
Robinson House

== Florida ==
- Arcade Hotel
- Belleview-Biltmore Hotel
- Boca Raton Resort
- Carling Hotel
- Casa Marina Hotel
- Casa Monica Hotel
- Chalet Suzanne
- Coral Gables Biltmore Hotel
- Dixie Walesbilt Hotel
- Don CeSar
- Fort Harrison Hotel
- Henry B. Plant Museum
- Hotel George Washington
- Hyatt Regency Jacksonville
- Kenilworth Lodge
- Ormond Hotel
- Plaza Hotel
- Polk Hotel
- Ponce De Leon Boutique Hotel
- Ponce de Leon Hotel
- Ponte Vedra Inn and Club
- Ritz Plaza Hotel
- Royal Poinciana Hotel
- Streamline Hotel
- Vinoy Park Hotel
- Well'sbuilt Hotel
- World Golf Village
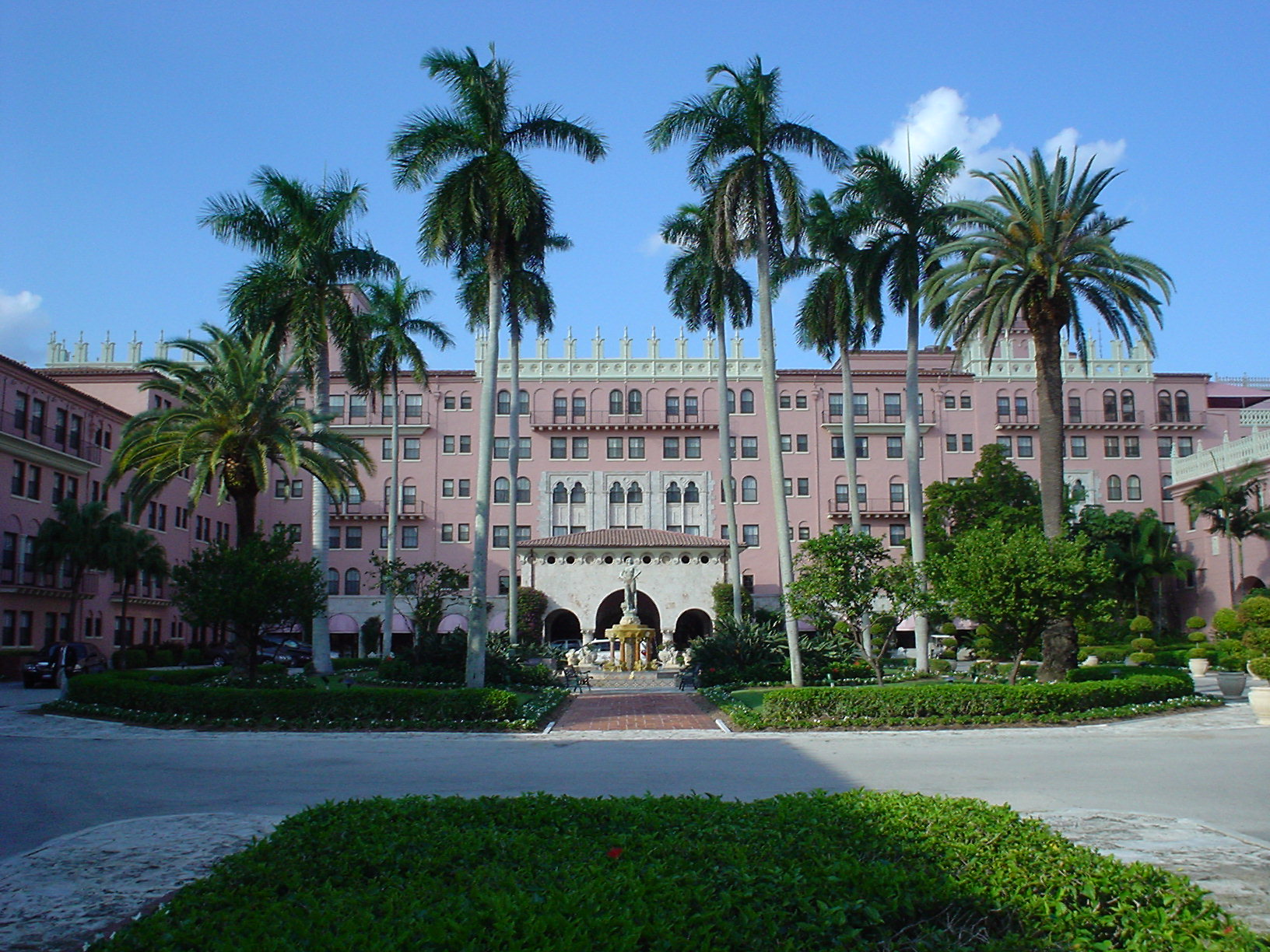
Boca Raton Resort

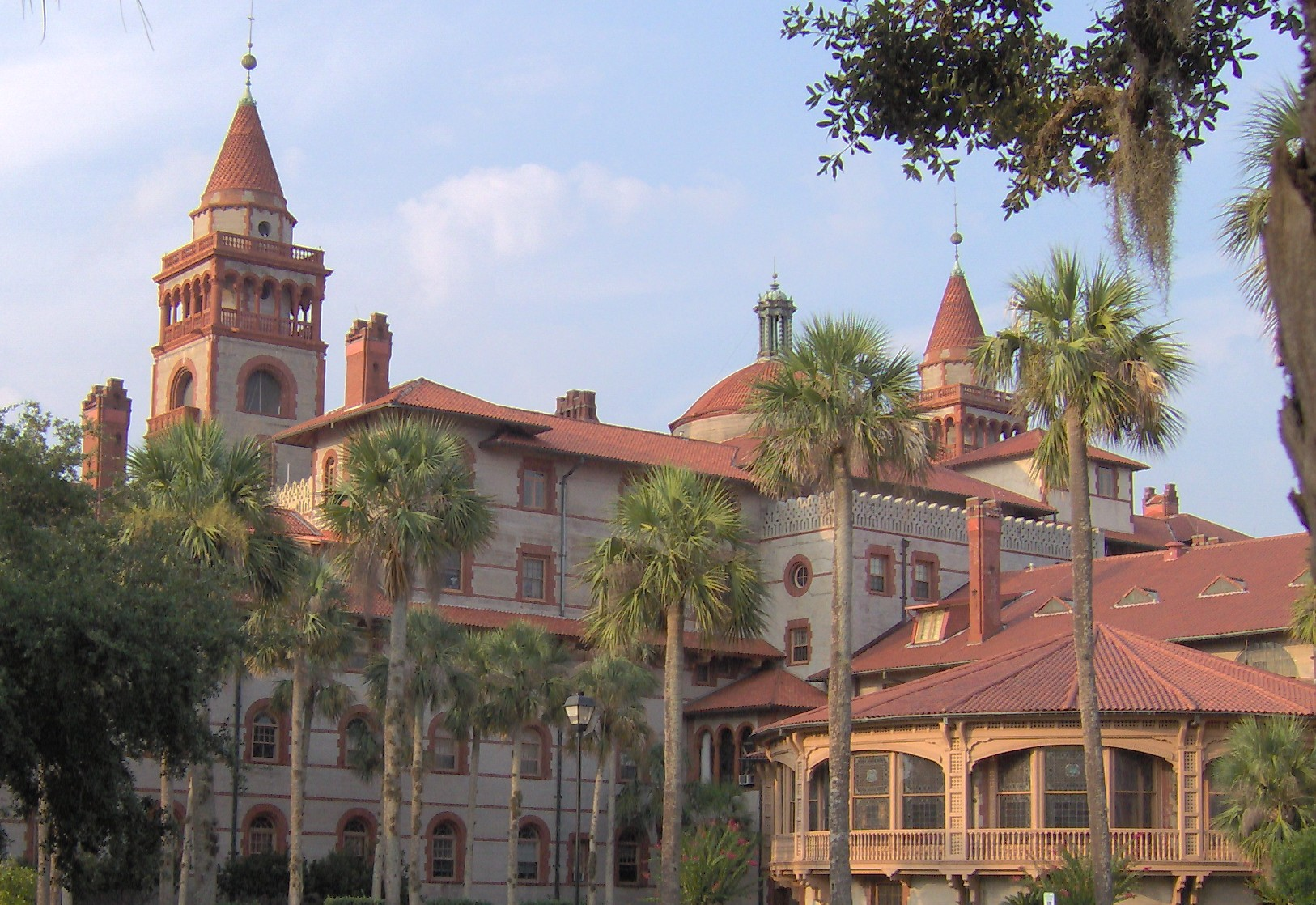
Ponce de Leon Hotel

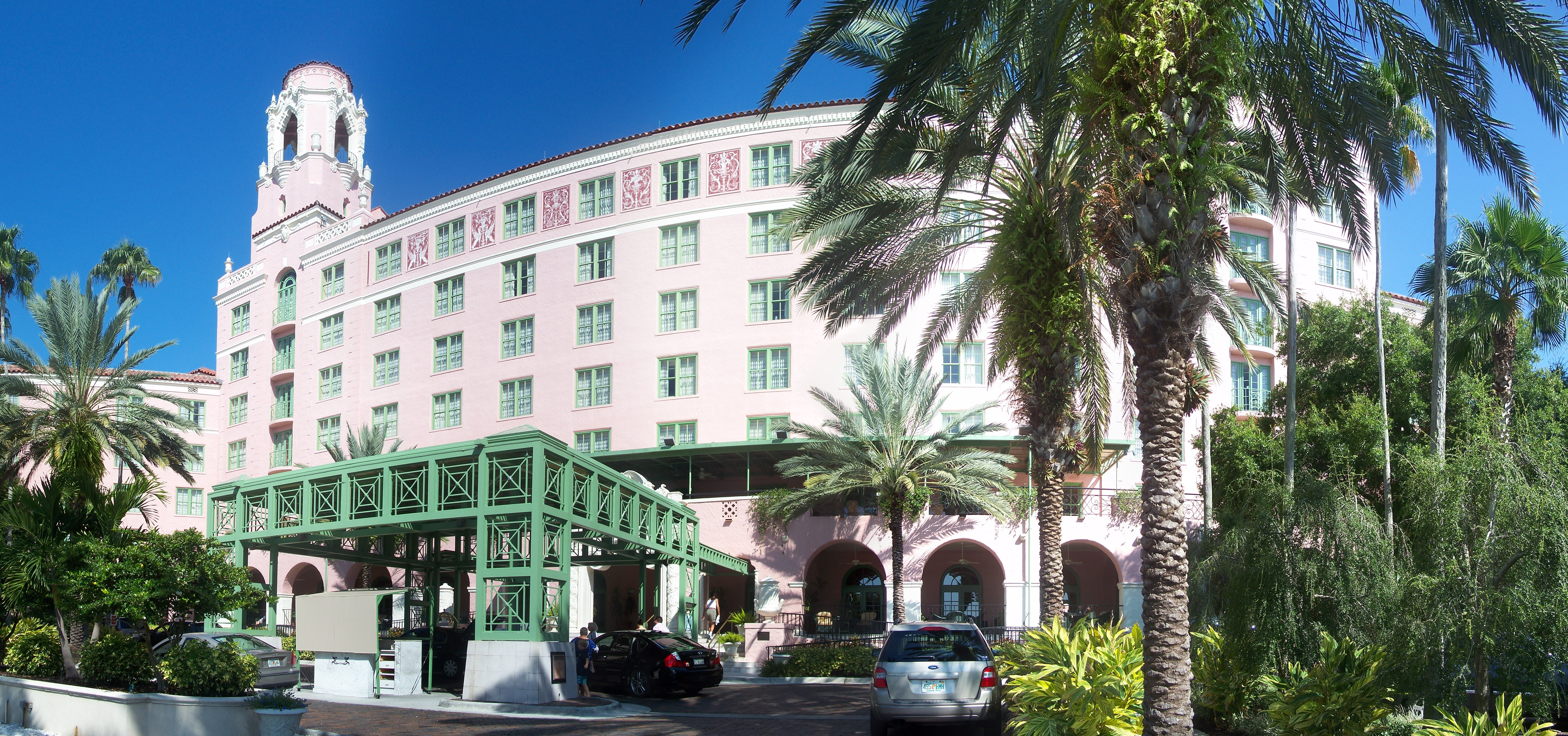
Vinoy Park Hotel

=== Miami and Miami Beach ===
- Cadillac Hotel
- Capital at Brickell
- Clinton Hotel Miami Beach
- The Creek South Beach
- Delano Hotel
- Doral Hotel
- DuPont Plaza Hotel
- Eden Roc Renaissance Hotel Miami Beach
- EPIC Miami Residences and Hotel
- Espirito Santo Plaza
- Flamingo Hotel, Miami Beach
- Fontainebleau Miami Beach
- Four Seasons Hotel Miami
- The Grand Doubletree
- Icon Brickell
- Mandarin Oriental, Miami
- Marquis Residences
- Met 2 Marriott Marquis
- Miccosukee Resort and Gaming
- Mondrian Hotel
- The Mutiny Hotel
- Ocean Spray Hotel
- Ritz Plaza Hotel
- Saxony Hotel
- The Surfcomber Hotel
- W Miami Hotel
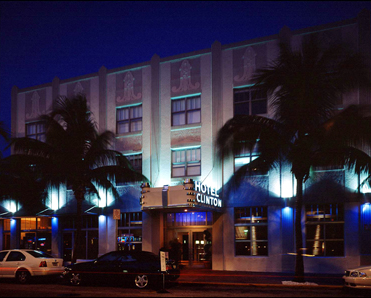
Clinton Hotel Miami Beach

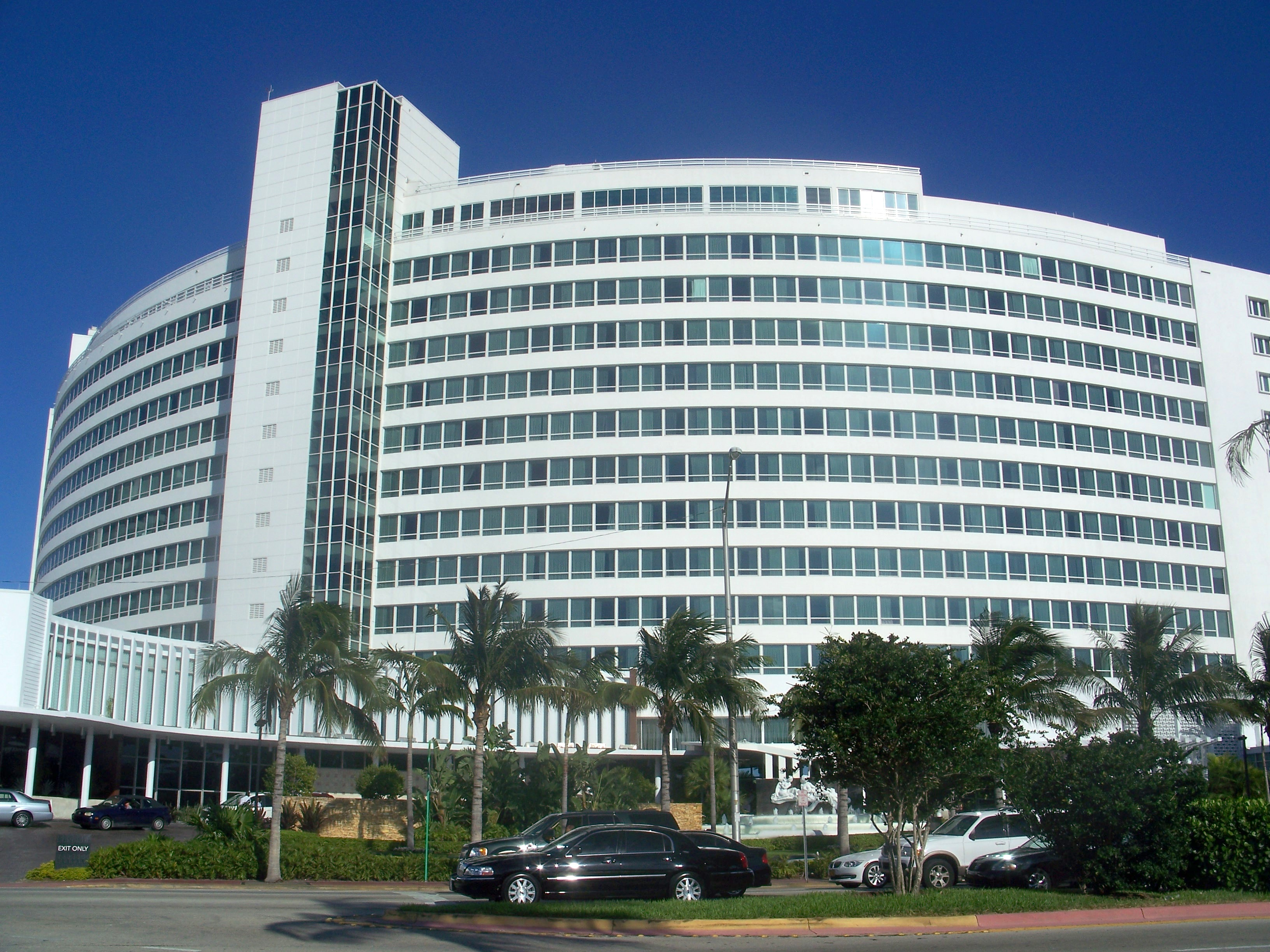
Fontainebleau Miami Beach

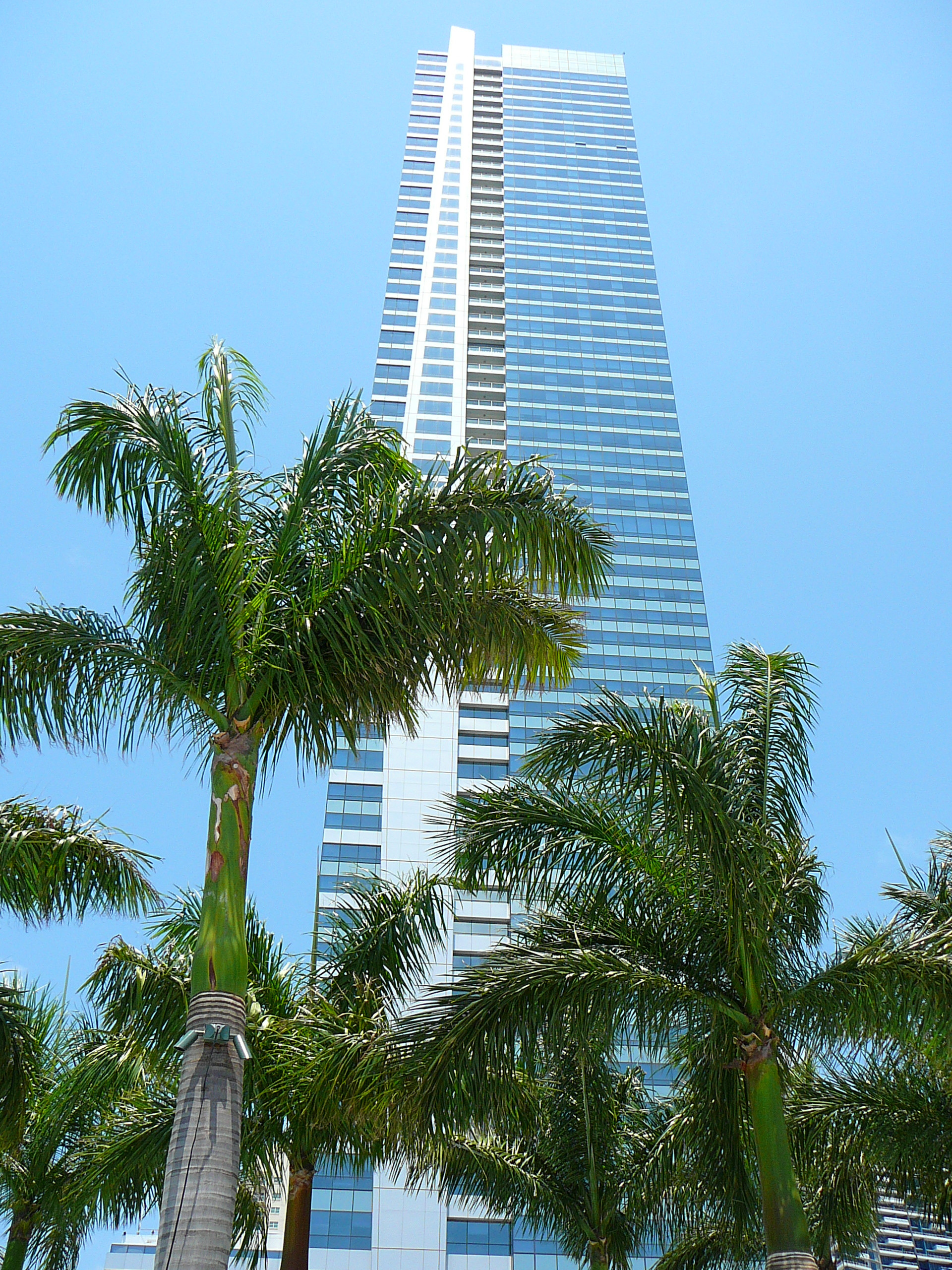
Four Seasons Hotel Miami

=== Orlando ===
- Court of Flags Resort
- Marriott's Grande Vista
- Marriott's Orlando World Center
- Holiday Inn Resort Orlando Suites – Waterpark (Formerly Nickelodeon Suites Resort)
- Parliament House
- The Peabody Orlando
- Seminole Hotel
- Seralago Hotel & Suites Main Gate East
- Well'sbuilt Hotel

==== Walt Disney World area ====
- Bay Lake Tower
- Best Western Lake Buena Vista Resort Hotel
- Buena Vista Palace Resort & Spa
- Disney's All-Star Movies Resort
- Disney's All-Star Music Resort
- Disney's All-Star Sports Resort
- Disney's Animal Kingdom Lodge
- Disney's Art of Animation Resort
- Disney's Beach Club Resort
- Disney's BoardWalk Resort
- Disney's Caribbean Beach Resort
- Disney's Contemporary Resort
- Disney's Coronado Springs Resort
- Disney's Grand Floridian Resort & Spa
- Disney's Old Key West Resort
- Disney's Polynesian Resort
- Disney's Pop Century Resort
- Disney's Port Orleans Resort
- Disney's Riviera Resort
- Disney's Wilderness Lodge
- Disney's Yacht Club Resort
- Hilton Walt Disney World
- Holiday Inn in the Walt Disney World Resort
- Royal Plaza Hotel
- Shades of Green
- Walt Disney World Dolphin
- Walt Disney World Swan
- Wyndham Lake Buena Vista
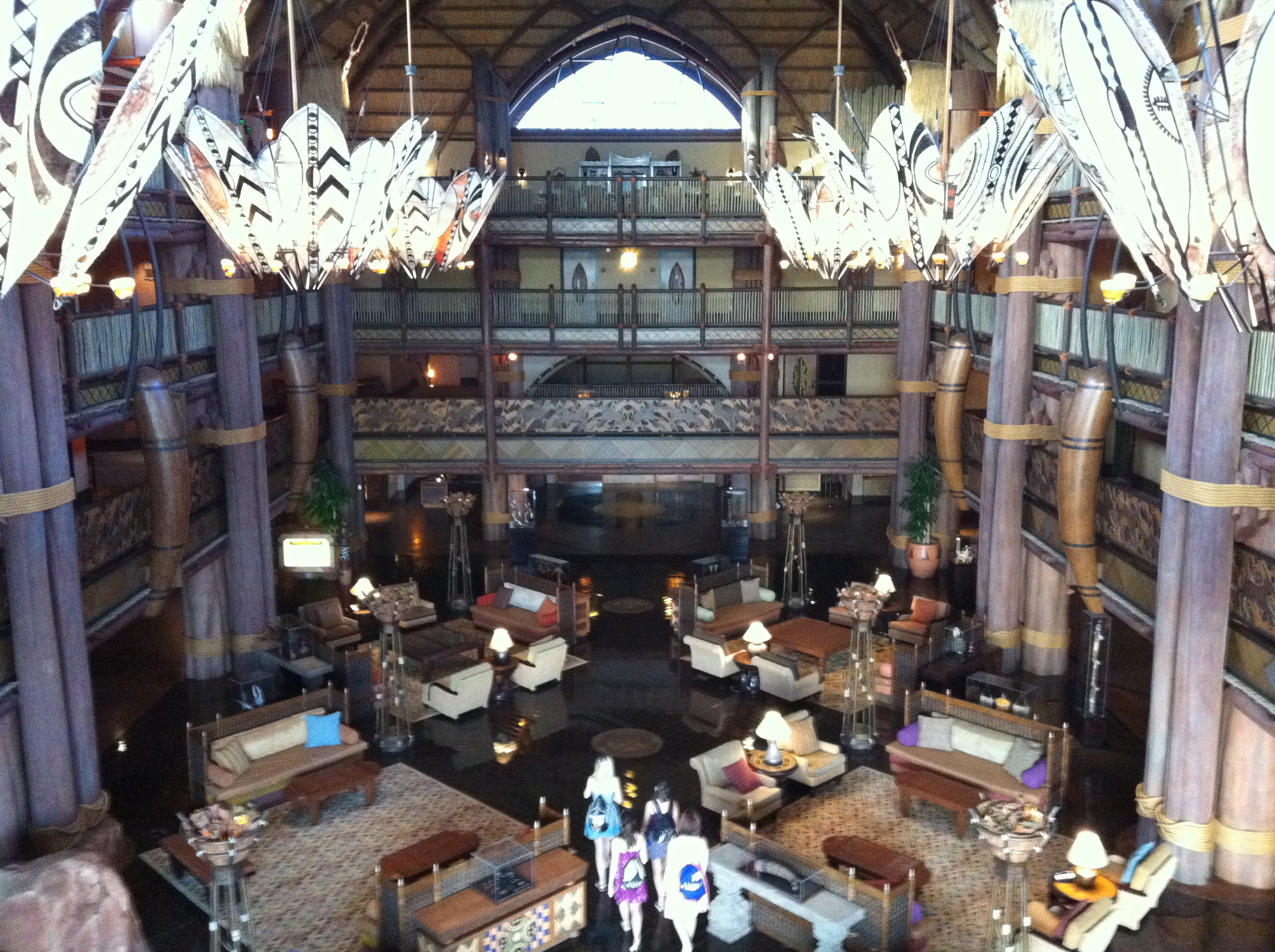
Disney's Animal Kingdom Lodge

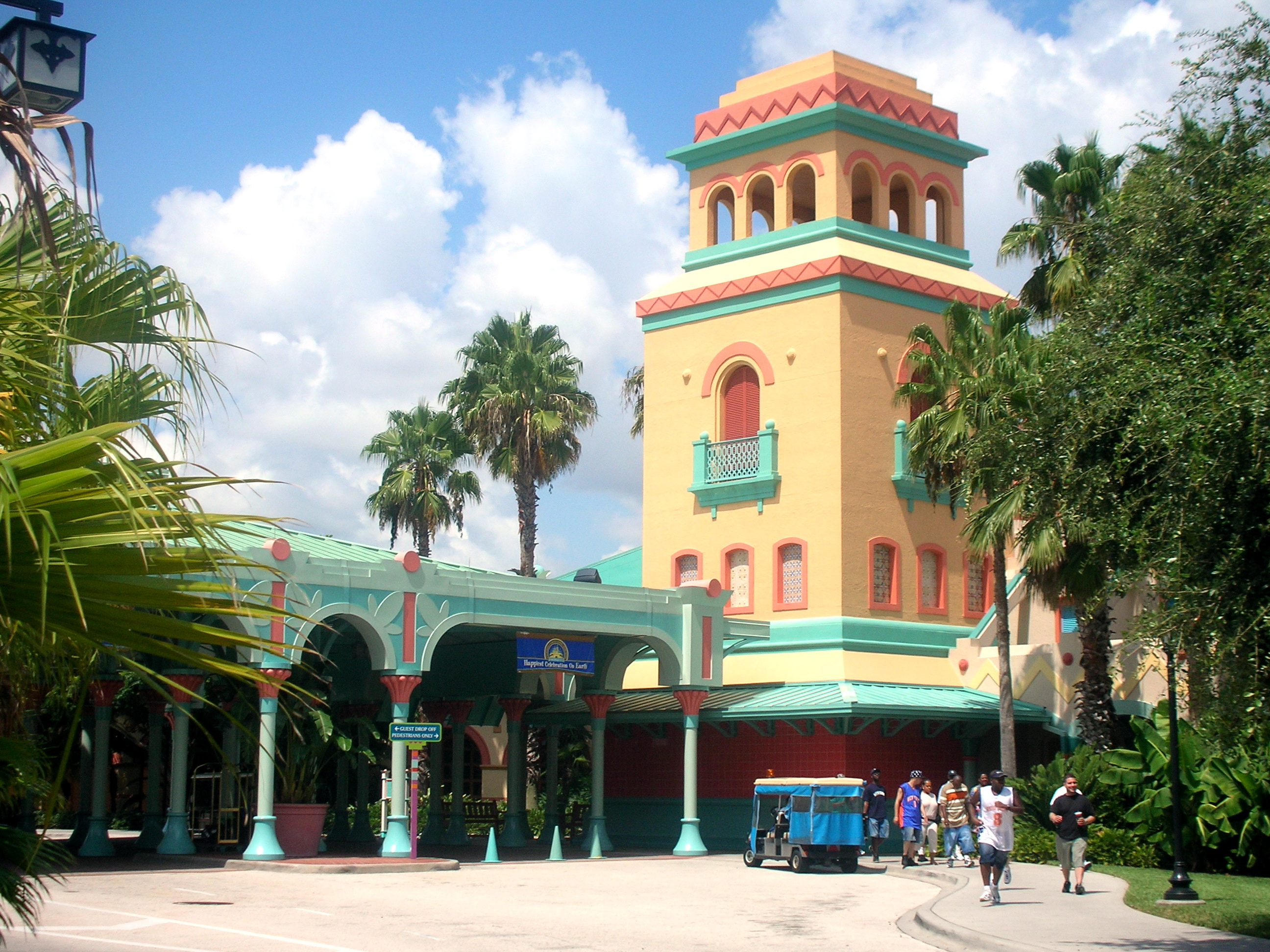
Disney's Caribbean Beach Resort

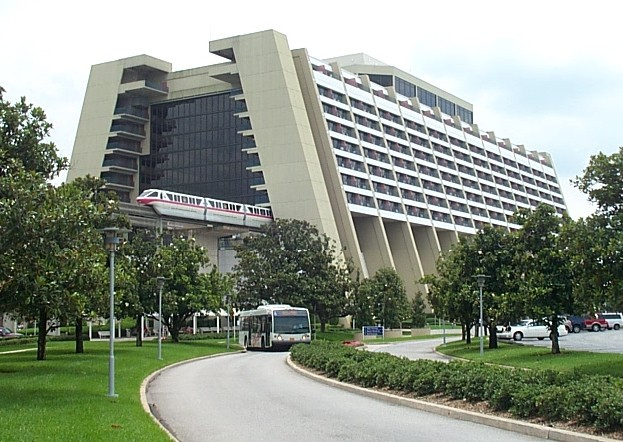
Disney's Contemporary Resort

== Georgia ==
- Jekyll Island Club
- King and Prince Hotel
- Lithia Springs Hotel
- Windsor Hotel
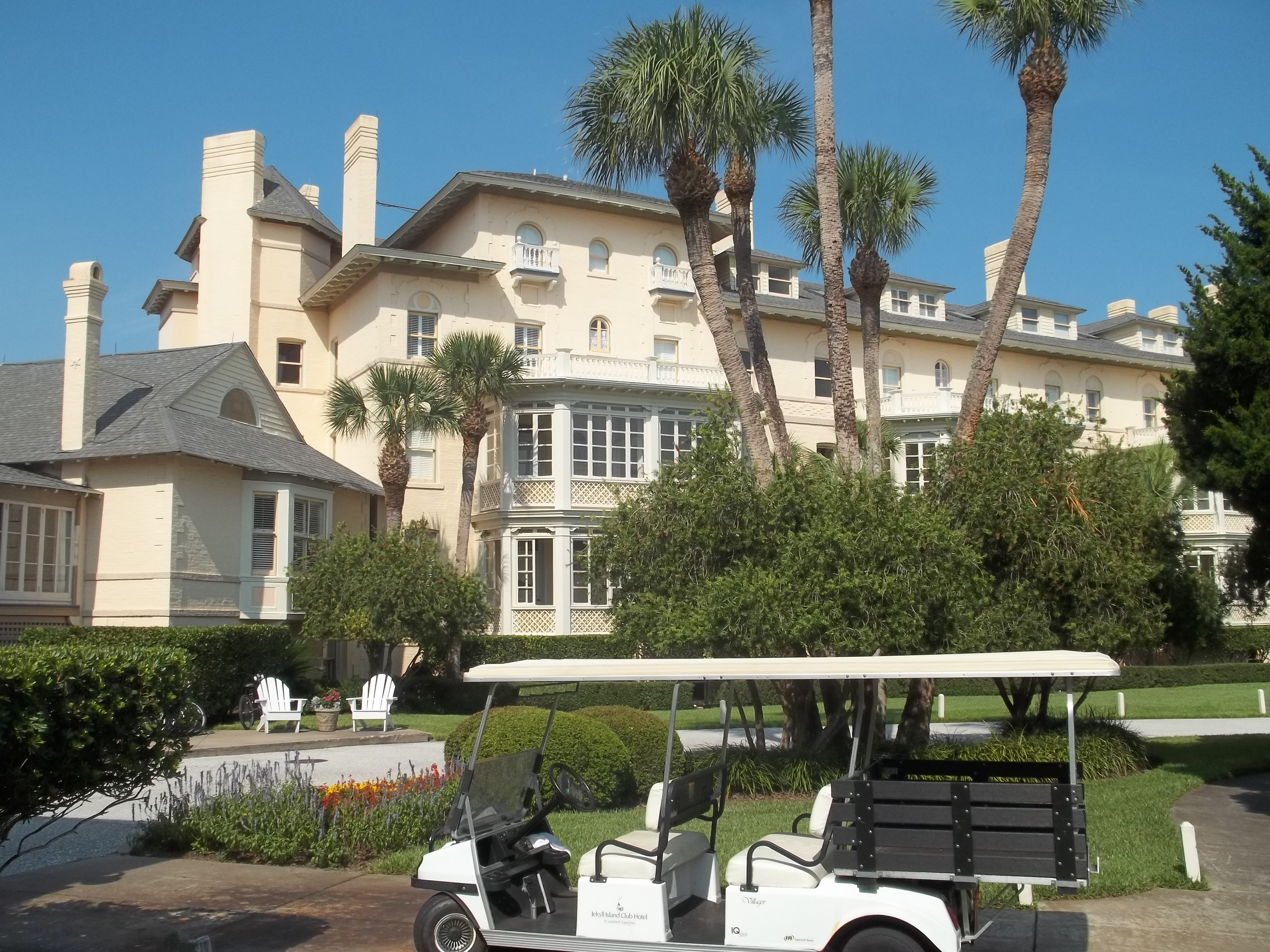
Jekyll Island Club

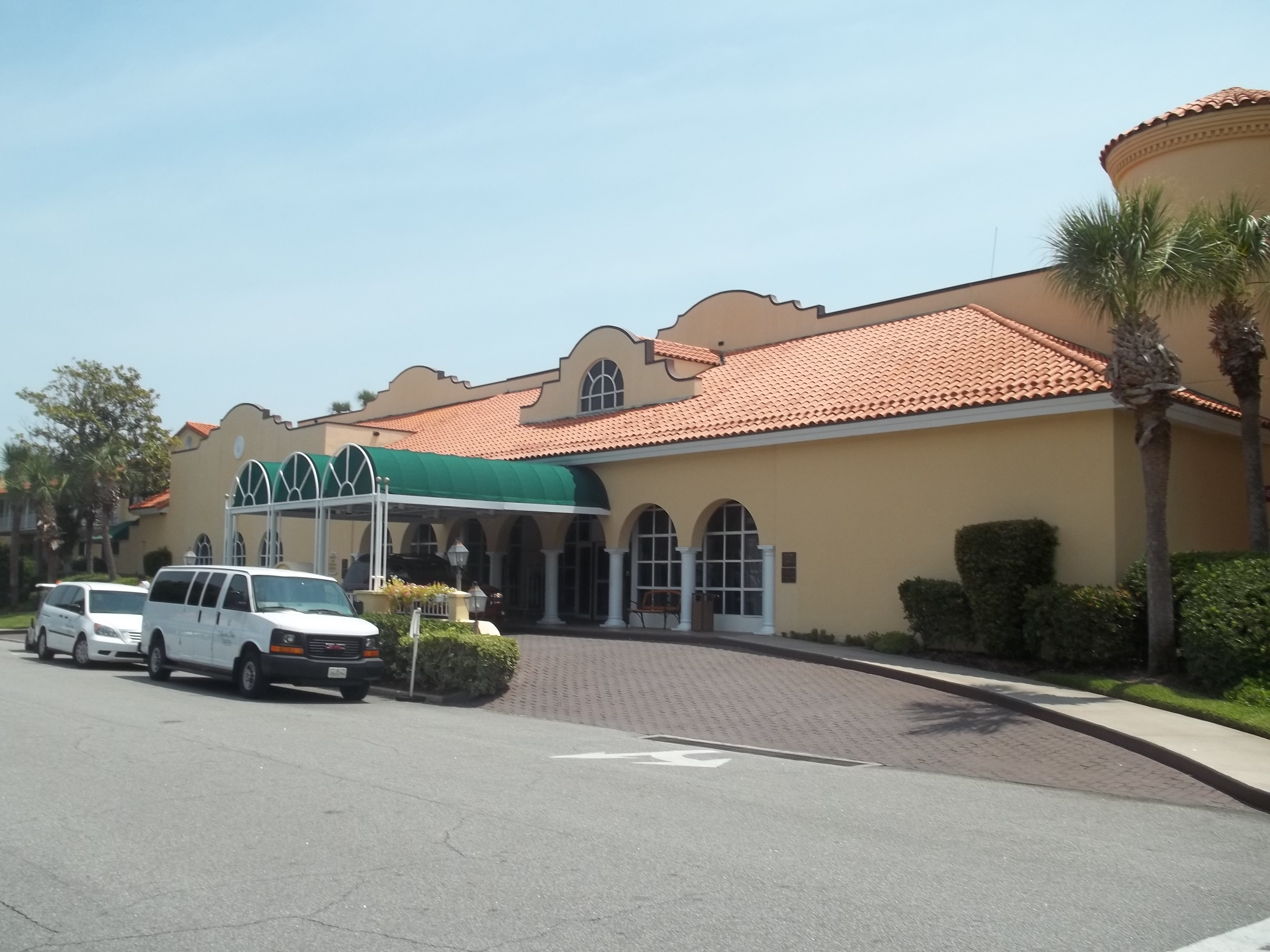
King and Prince Hotel

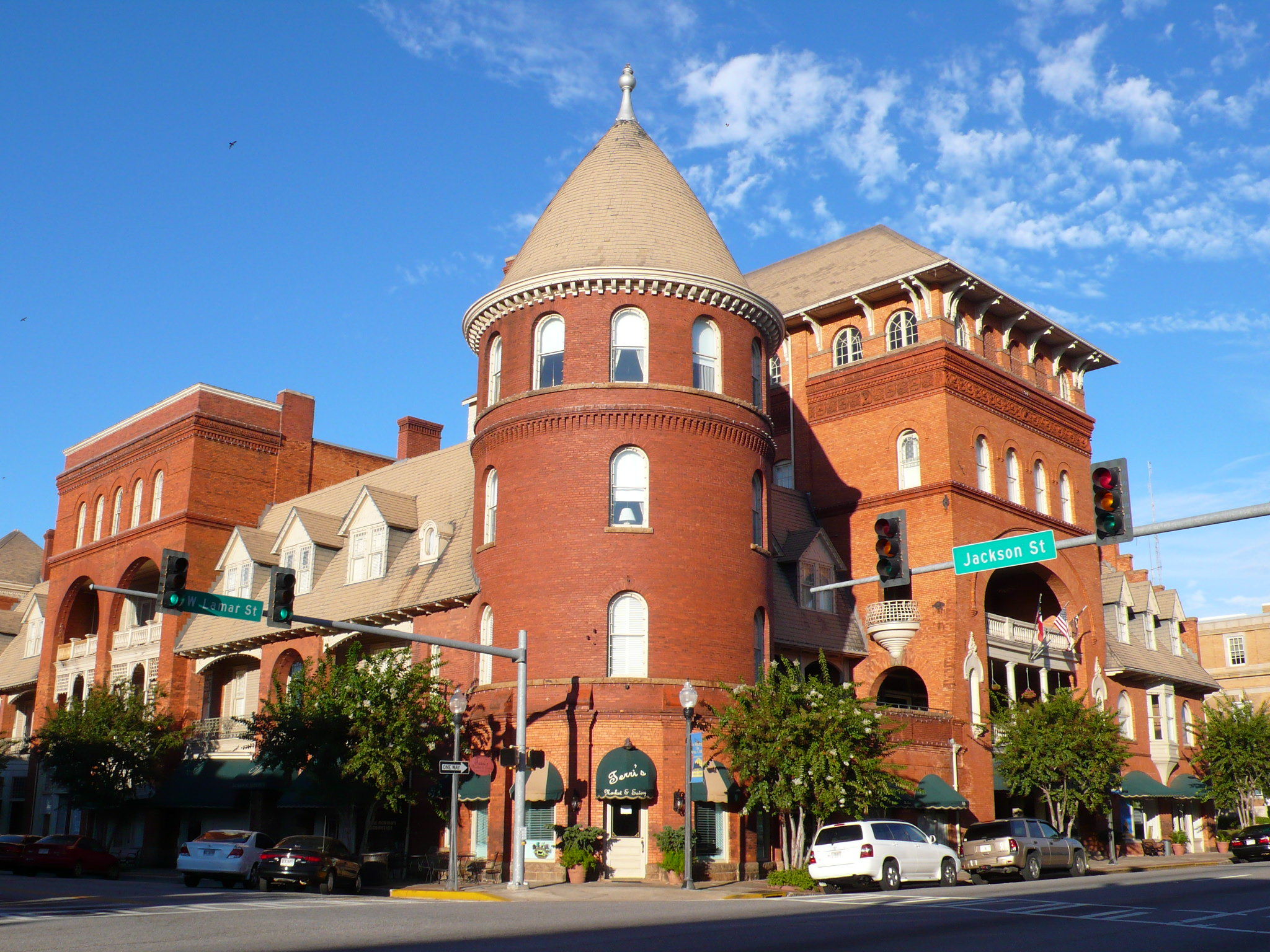
Windsor Hotel

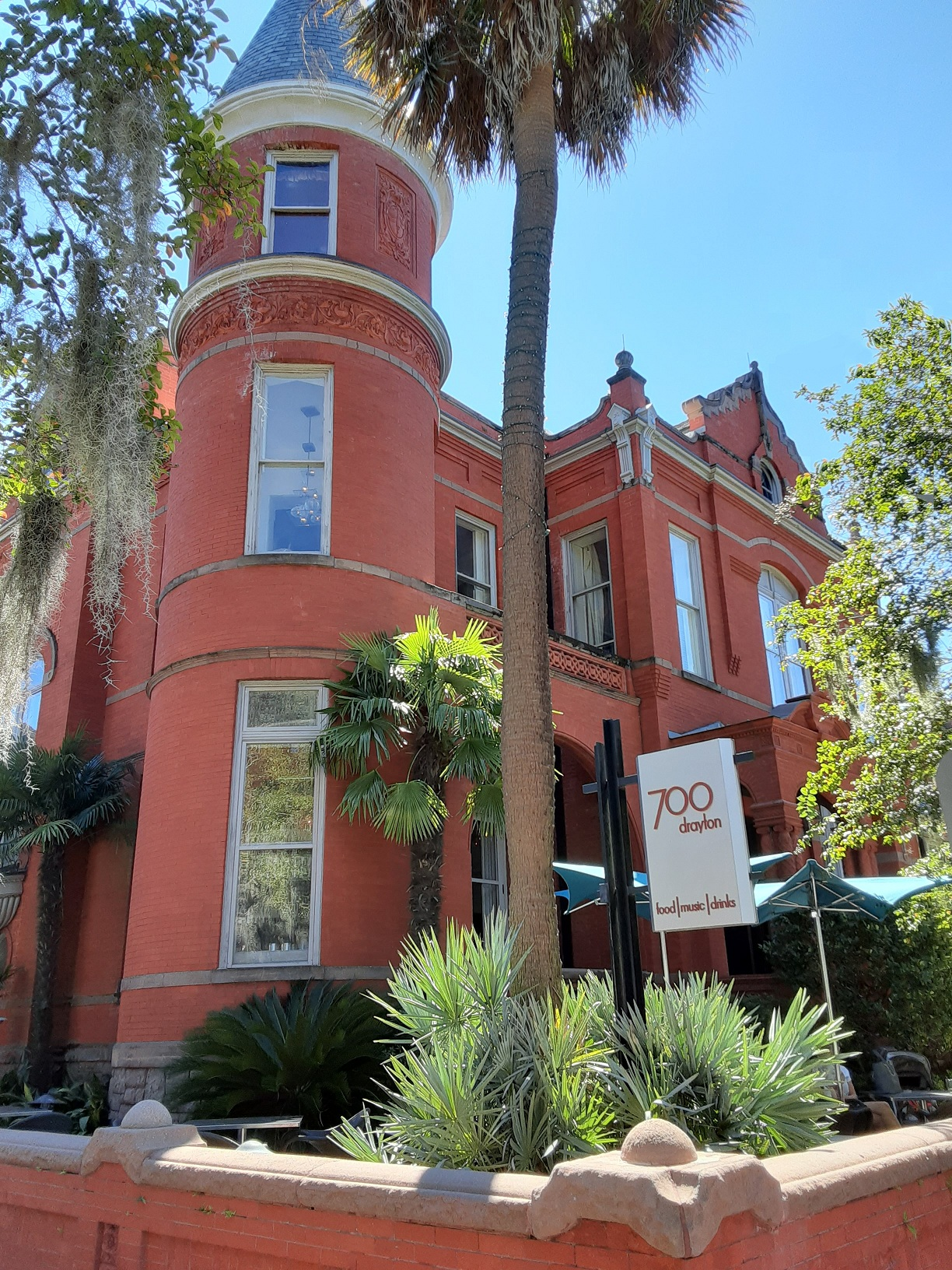
Mansion on Forsyth Park

=== Atlanta ===
- Atlanta Biltmore Hotel and Biltmore Apartments
- Atlanta Marriott Marquis
- Four Seasons Hotel Atlanta
- Georgian Terrace Hotel
- Henry Grady Hotel
- Hyatt Regency Atlanta
- Kimball House
- The Mansion on Peachtree
- Markham House
- Rhodes-Haverty Building
- TWELVE Midtown
- Washington Hall
- Westin Peachtree Plaza Hotel
- Winecoff Hotel
- Clermont Hotel
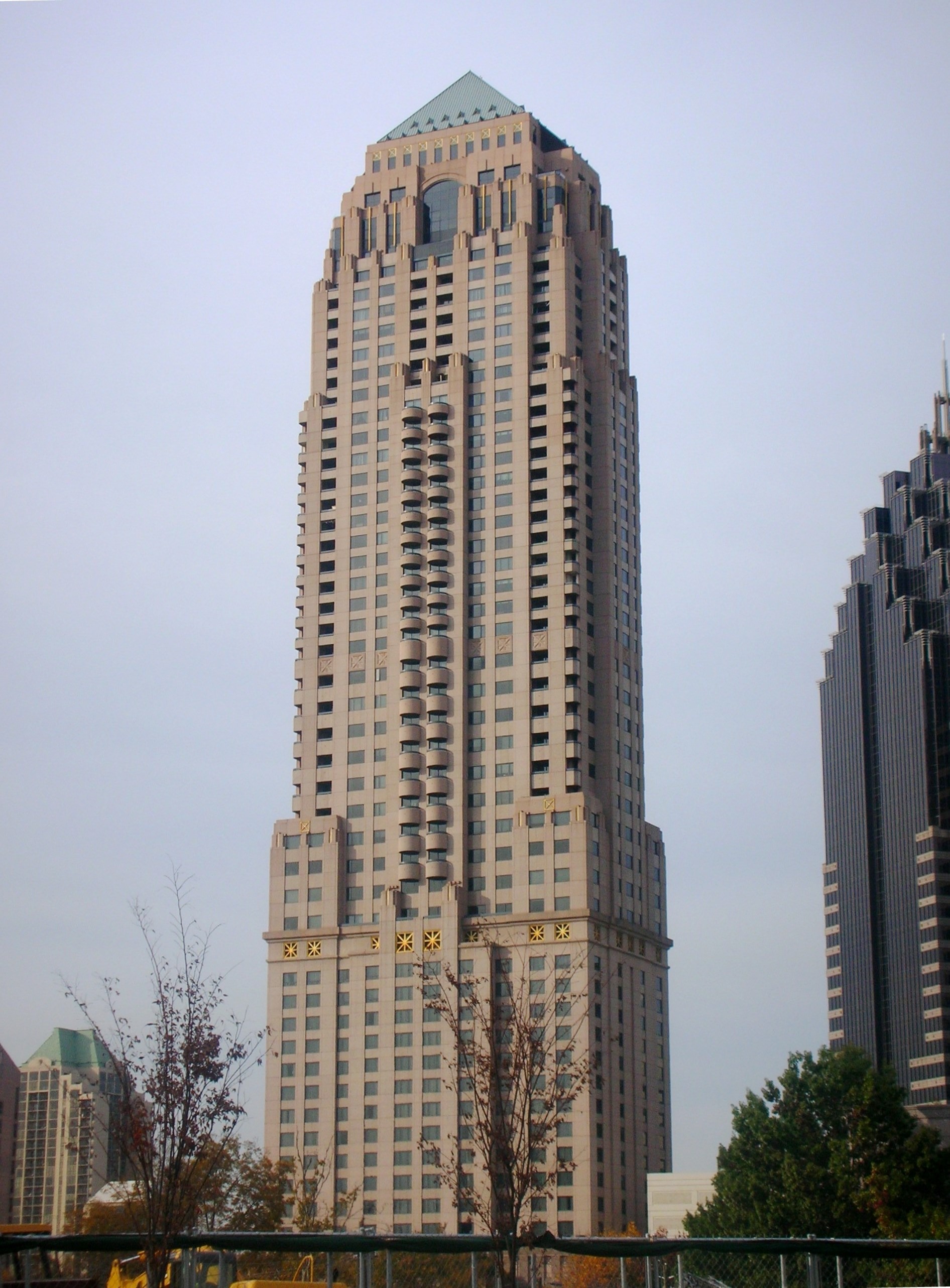
Four Seasons Hotel Atlanta

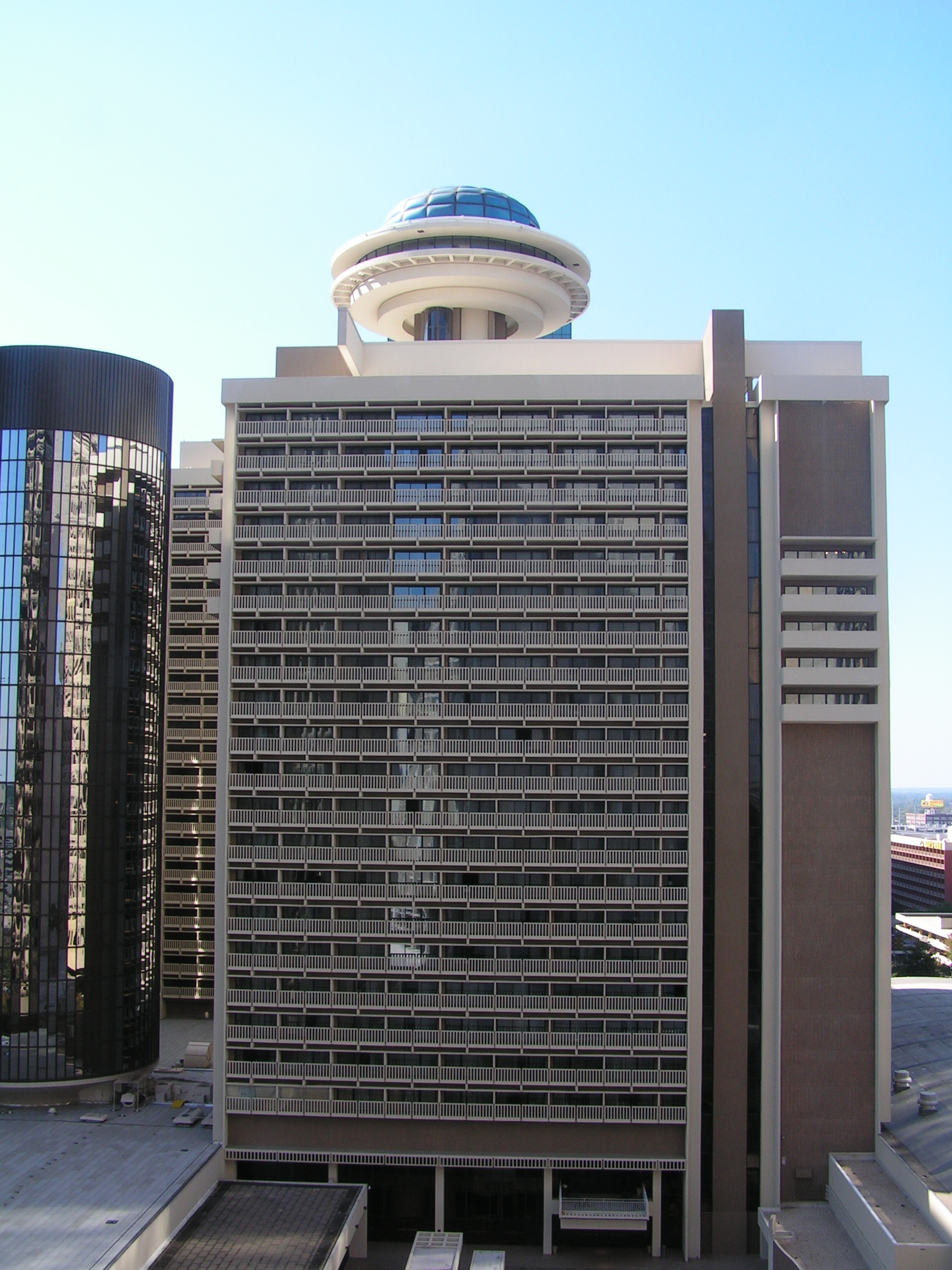
Hyatt Regency Atlanta

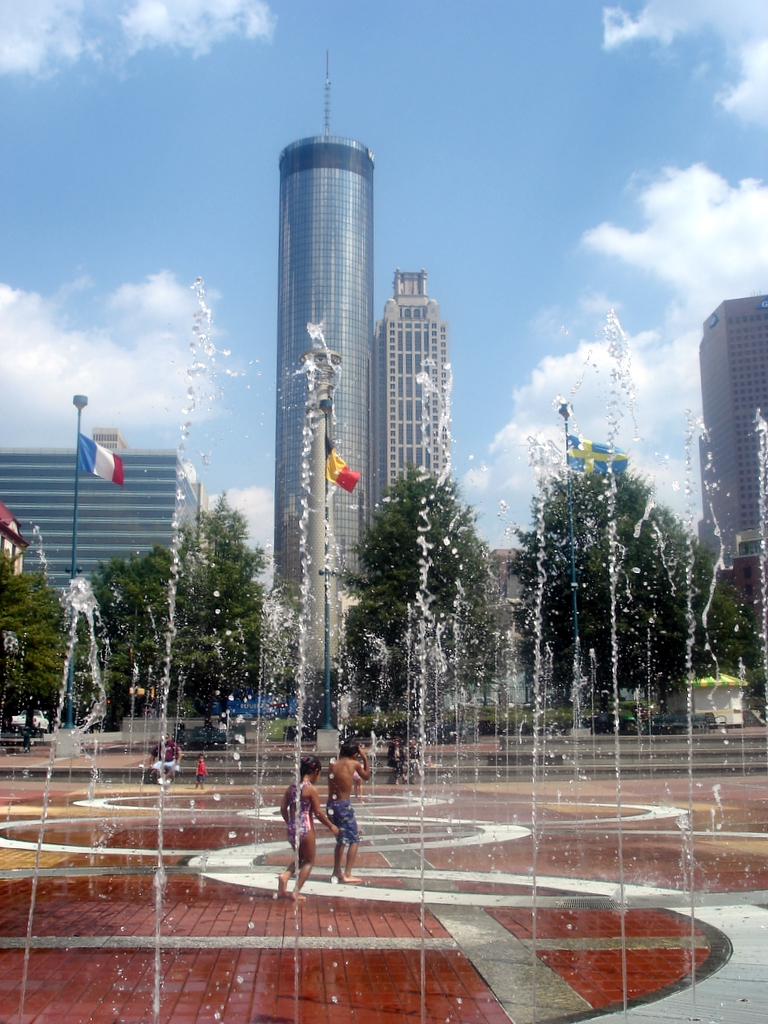
Westin Peachtree Plaza Hotel

== Hawaii ==
- 'Alohilani Resort Waikiki Beach
- Ala Moana Hotel
- Alexander Young Building
- Aulani
- Coco Palms Resort
- The Fairmont Orchid
- Four Seasons Resort Hualalai
- Four Seasons Resort Lanai
- Four Seasons Resort Maui
- Hale Koa Hotel
- Halekulani
- Hilton Hawaiian Village
- Hilton Waikoloa Village
- The Ilikai
- Mauna Kea Beach Hotel
- Moana Hotel
- Royal Hawaiian Hotel
- Sheraton Waikiki Hotel
- Trump International Hotel and Tower (Honolulu)
- Turtle Bay Resort
- Volcano House
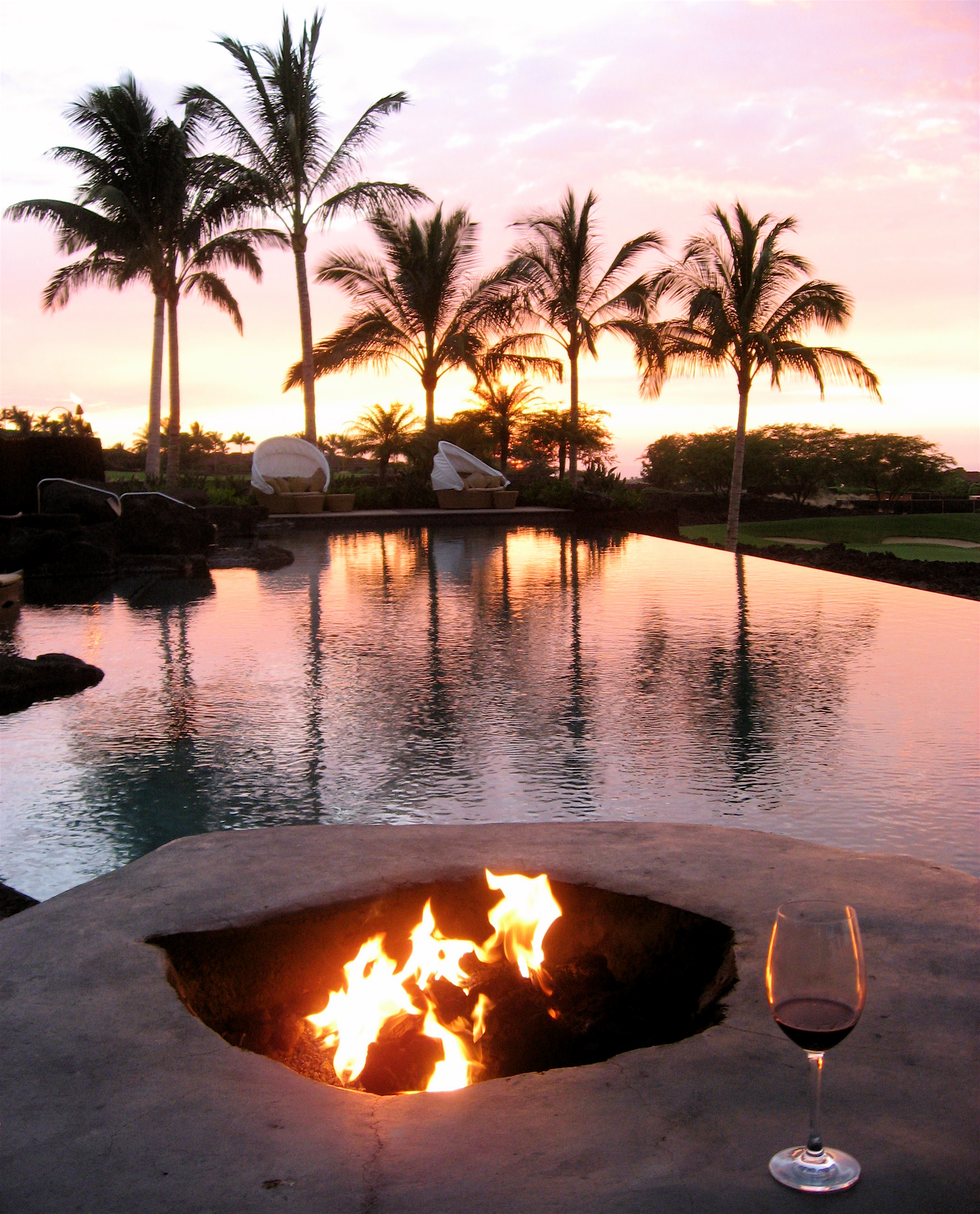
Four Seasons Resort Hualalai

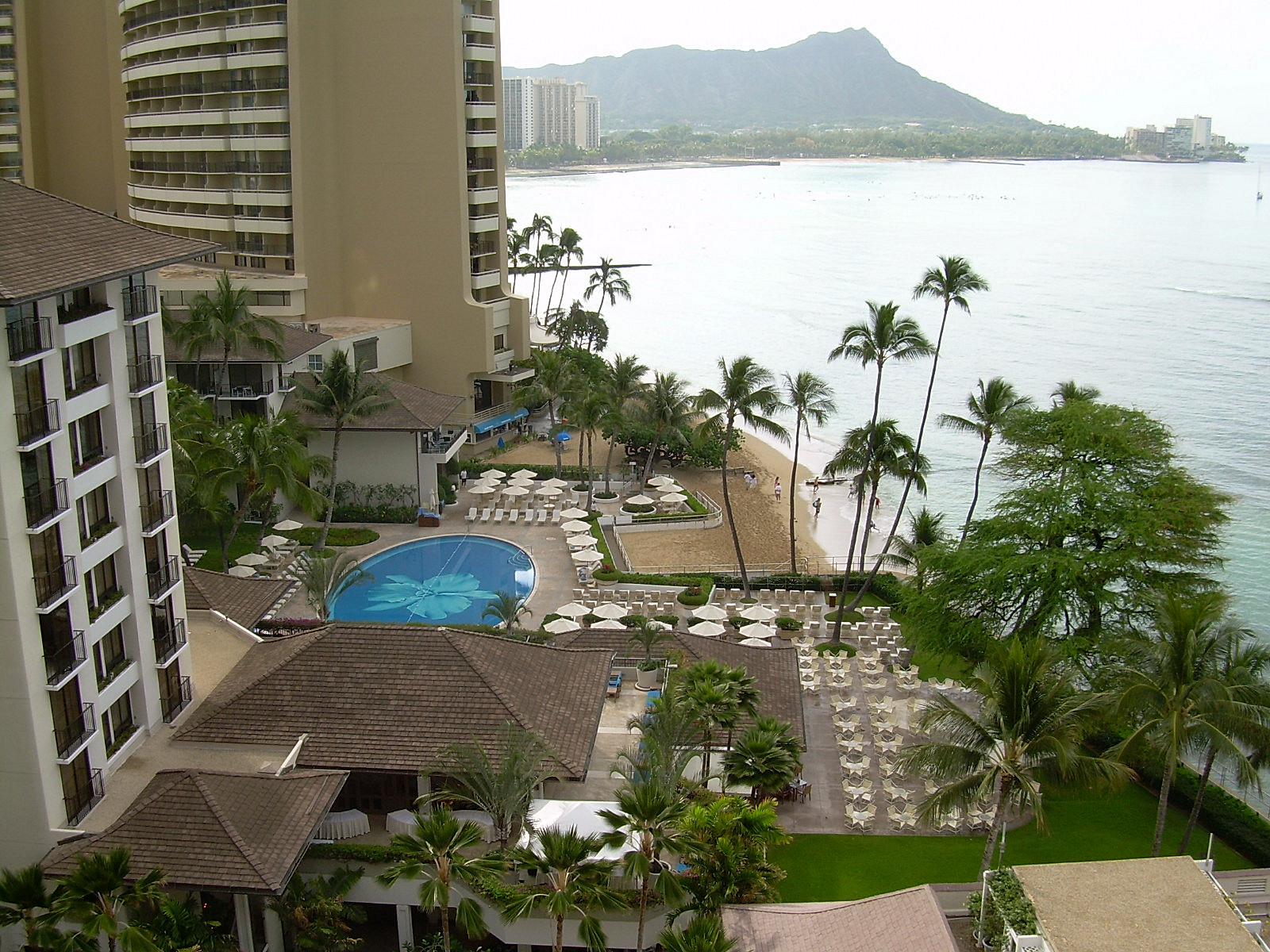
Halekulani

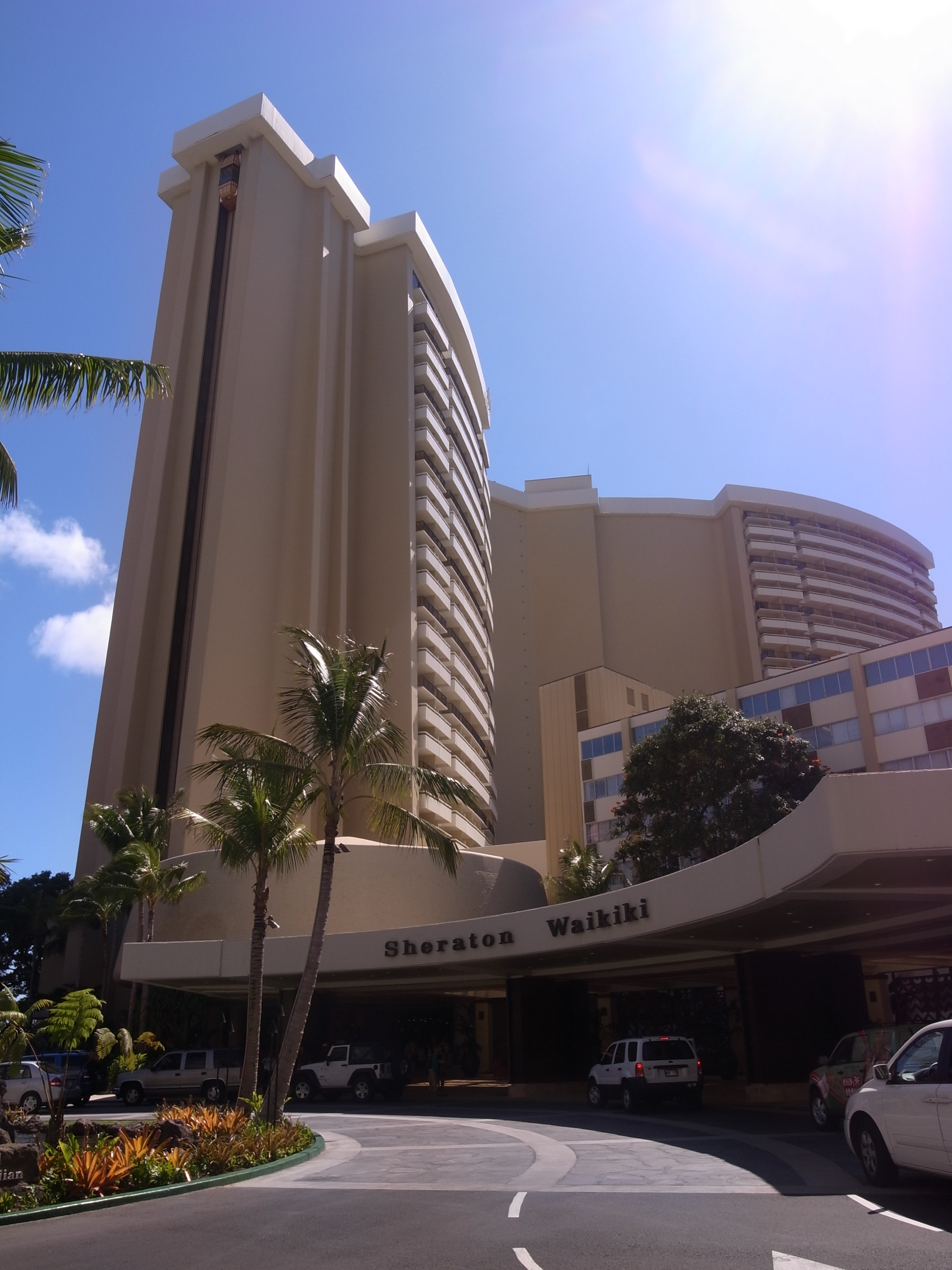
Sheraton Waikiki Hotel

== Idaho ==
- Bengoechea Hotel
- Dog Bark Park Inn
- Hotel Bovill
- Hotel Charbonneau
- The Roosevelt Inn
- Coeur d'Alene Resort
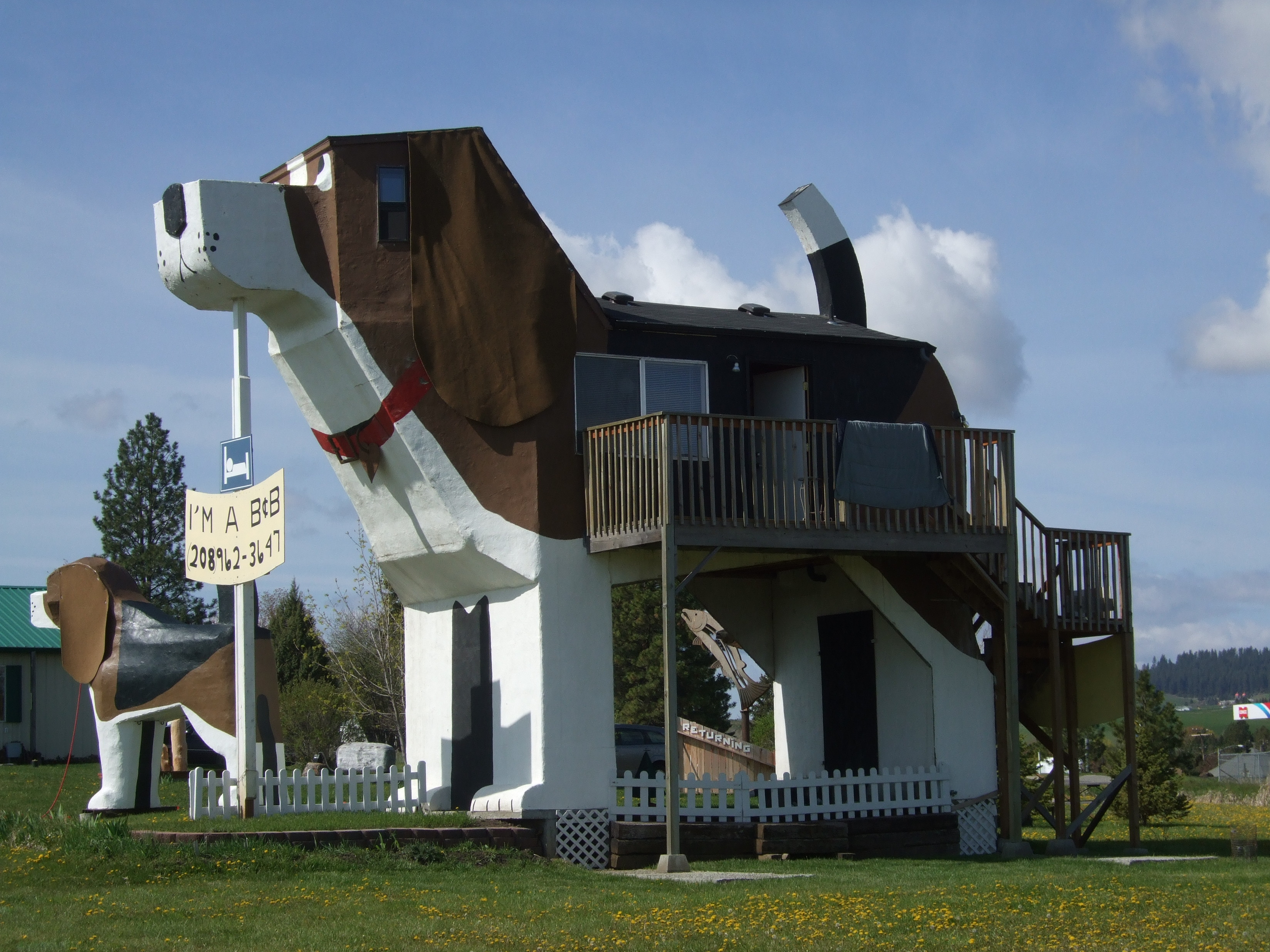
Dog Bark Park Inn

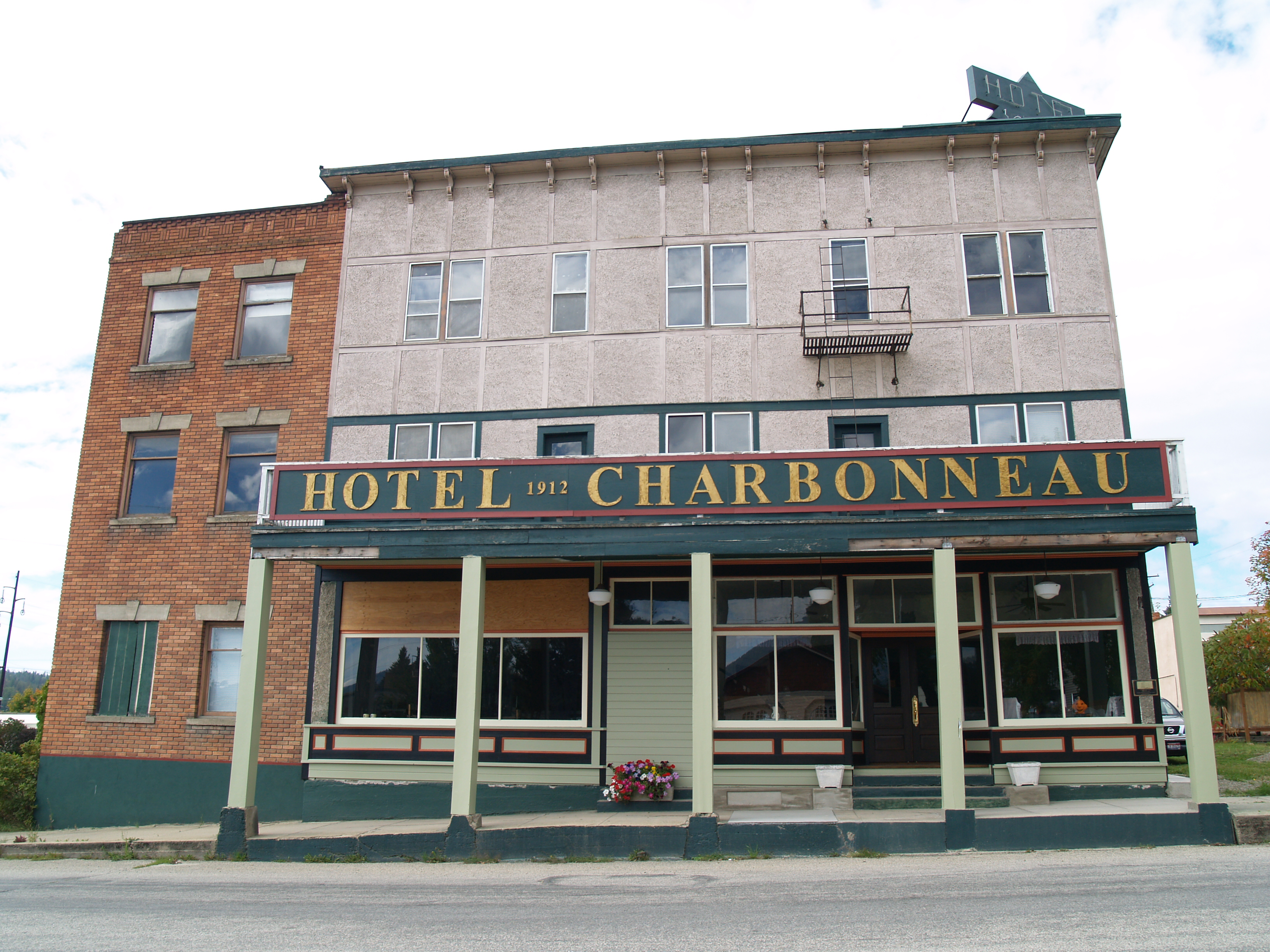
Hotel Charbonneau

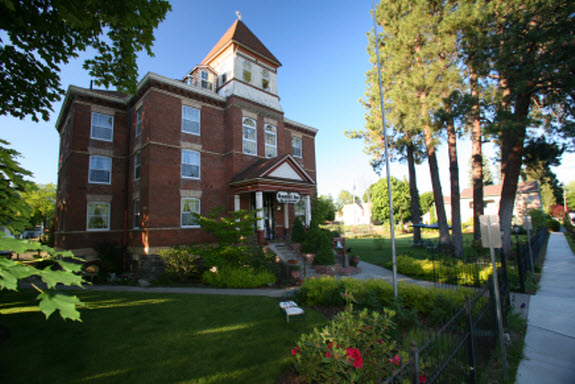
The Roosevelt Inn

== Illinois ==
- Belvidere Café, Motel, and Gas Station
- Central House
- Chestnut Mountain
- Chick House
- Faust Landmark
- Fort Armstrong Hotel
- Grand Rapids Hotel
- Harrah's Joliet
- Hilton Springfield
- Hotel Kewanee
- LeClaire Hotel
- Leland Hotel
- Mermaid House Hotel
- Par-A-Dice Hotel and Casino
- Pere Marquette Hotel
- Pinehill Inn
- Rock River Hotel
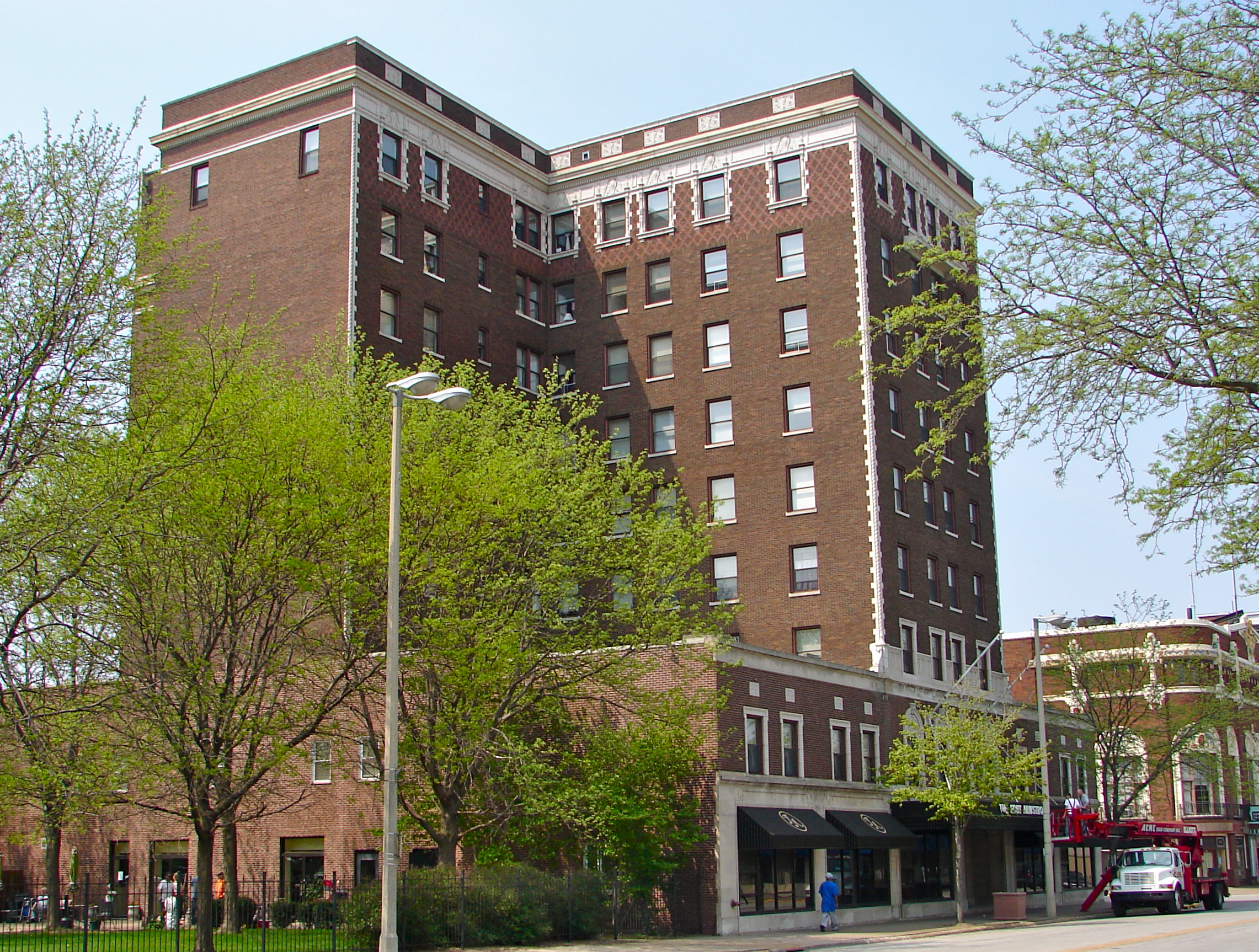
Fort Armstrong Hotel

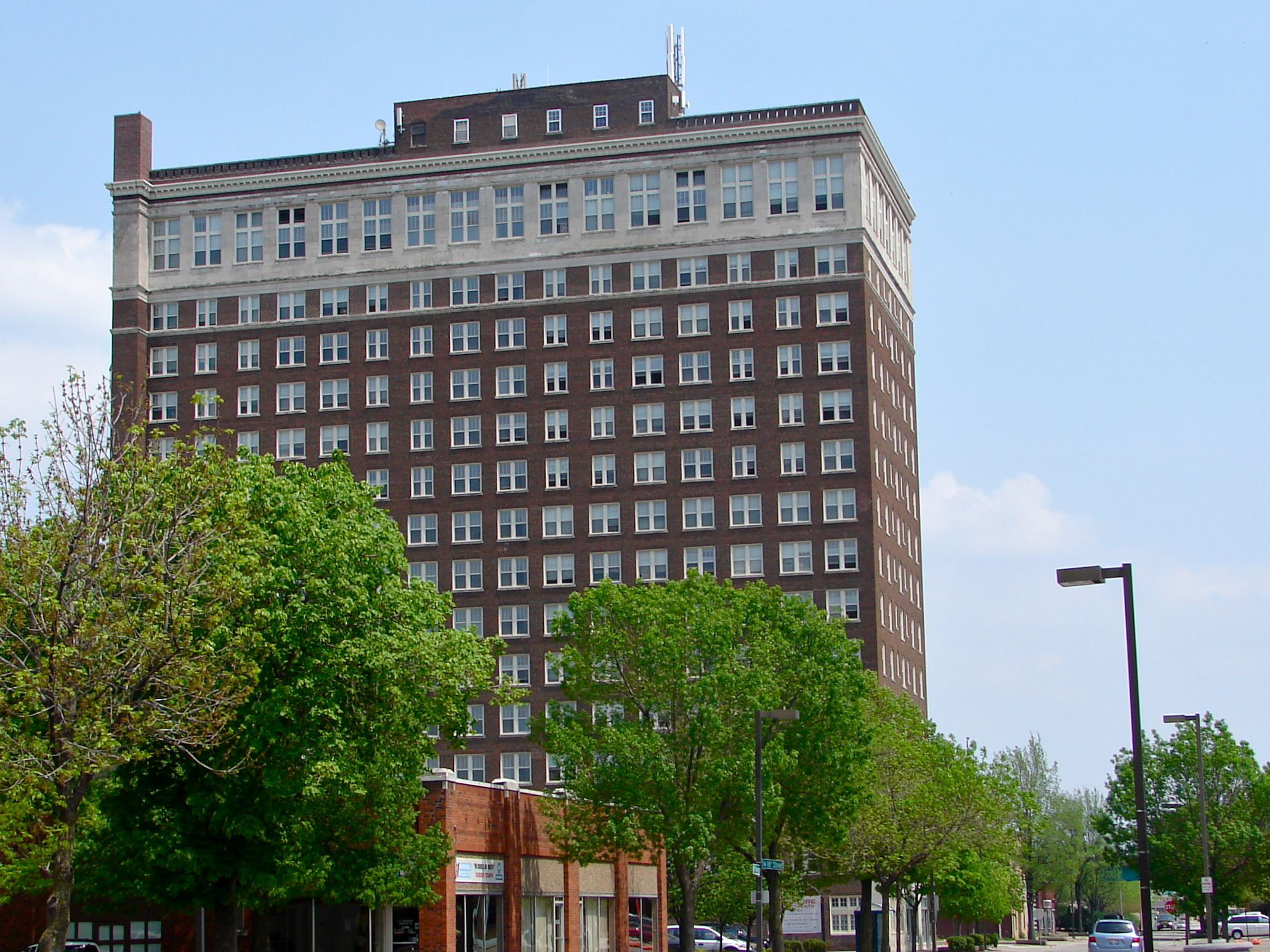
LeClaire Hotel

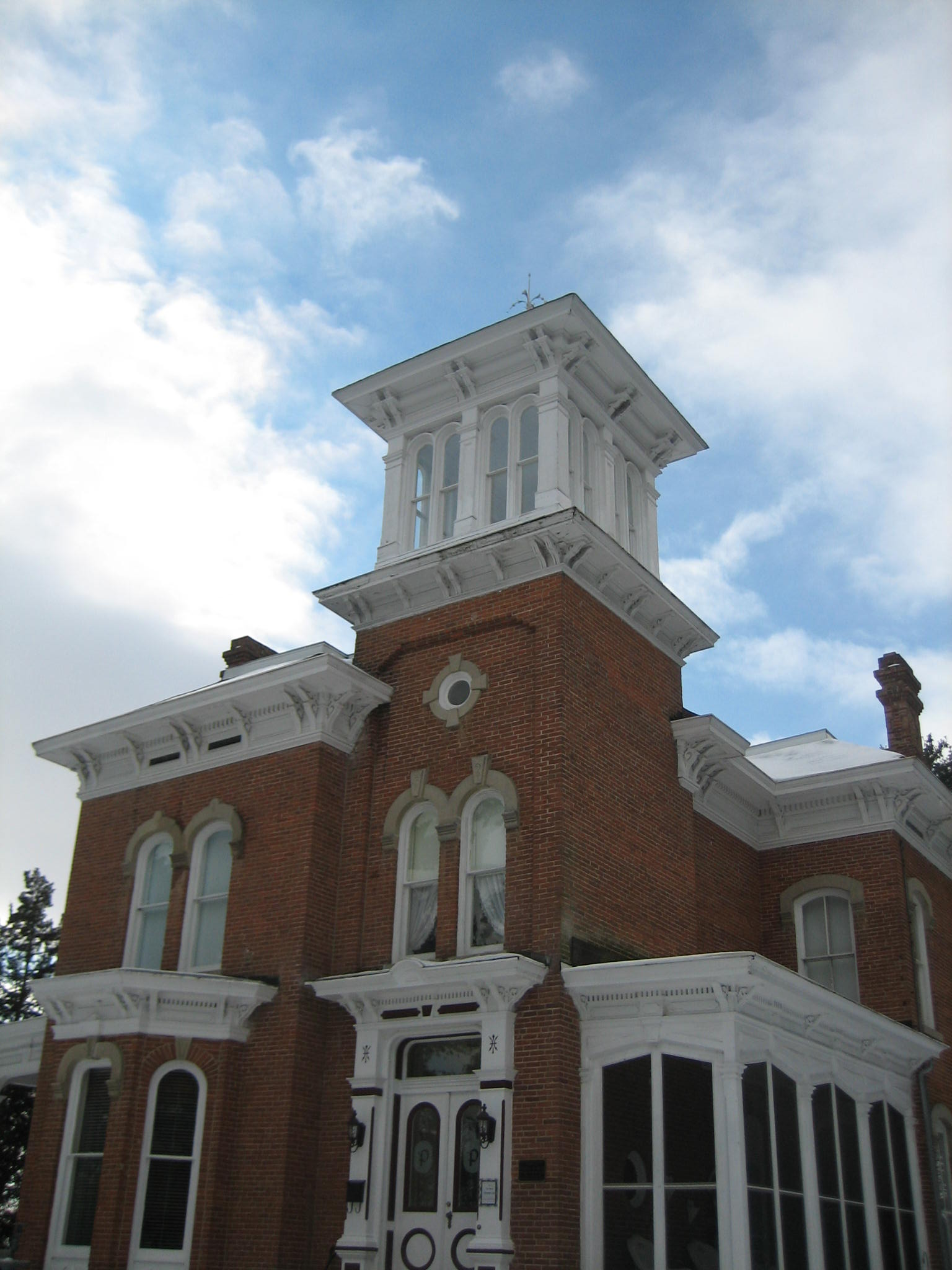
Pinehill Inn

=== Chicago ===
- 350 West Mart Center
- Allerton Hotel
- Aqua
- Carbide & Carbon Building
- Chicago Beach Hotel
- Congress Plaza Hotel
- Drake Hotel
- Elysian, Chicago
- Four Seasons Hotel Chicago
- Hilton Chicago
- Hotel Florence
- Hotel Windermere
- Hyatt Regency Chicago
- Inn of Chicago
- InterContinental Chicago
- Kinzie Hotel
- La Salle Hotel
- Morrison Hotel
- The Palmer House Hilton
- Park Hyatt Chicago
- The Peninsula Chicago
- Reliance Building
- Renaissance Blackstone Hotel
- Ritz-Carlton Chicago (A Four Seasons Hotel)
- Shoreland Hotel
- Silversmith Hotel
- Sisson Hotel
- Sofitel Chicago Water Tower
- Tokyo Hotel
- Trump International Hotel and Tower
- Waldorf-Astoria Hotel and Residence Tower
- Waterview Tower
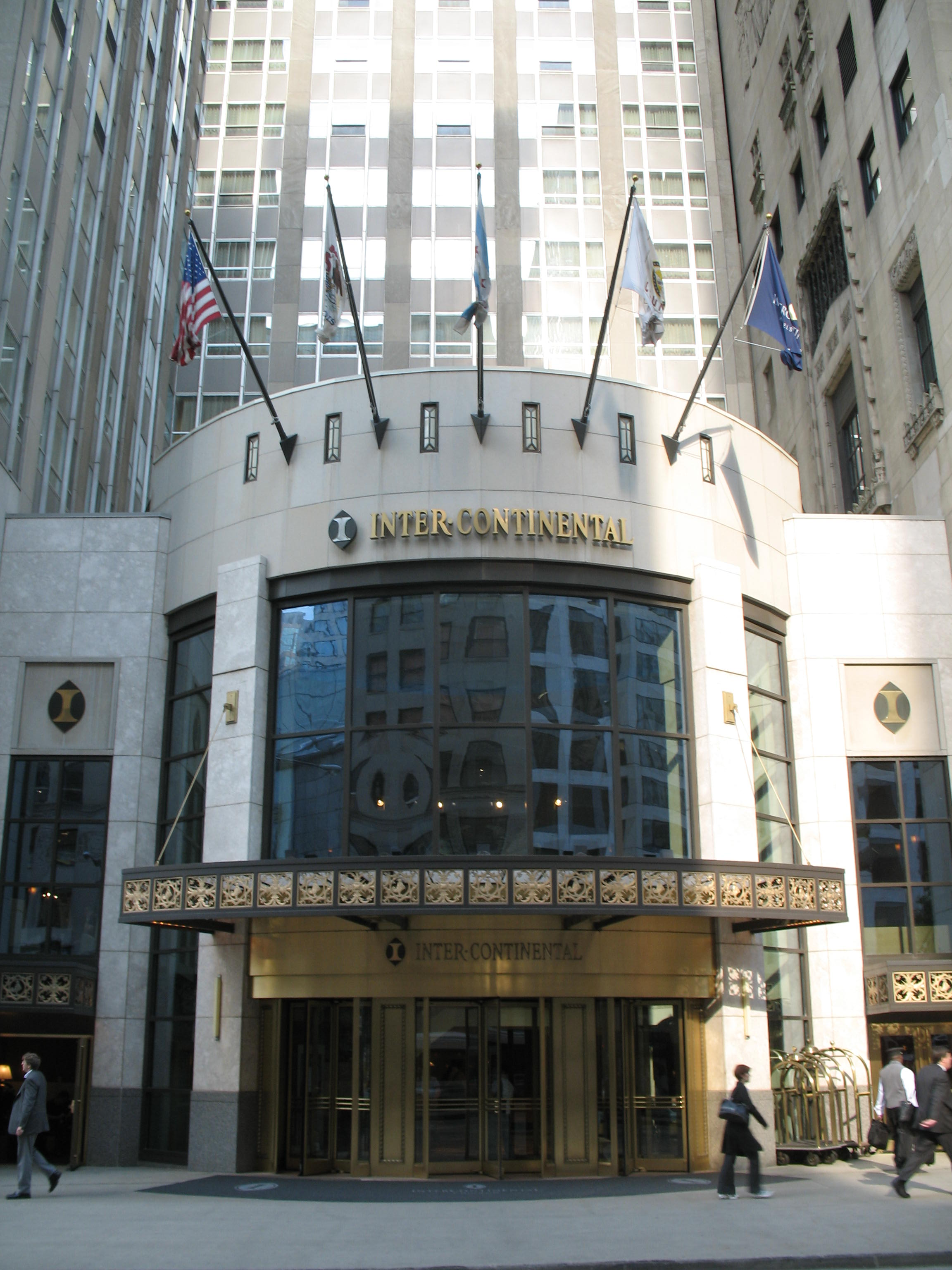
InterContinental Chicago

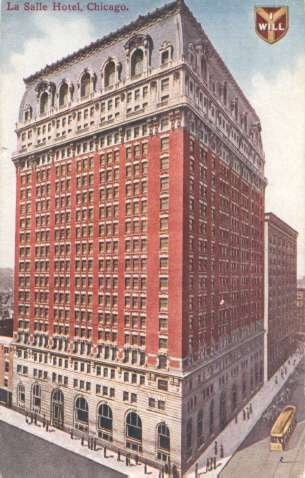
La Salle Hotel

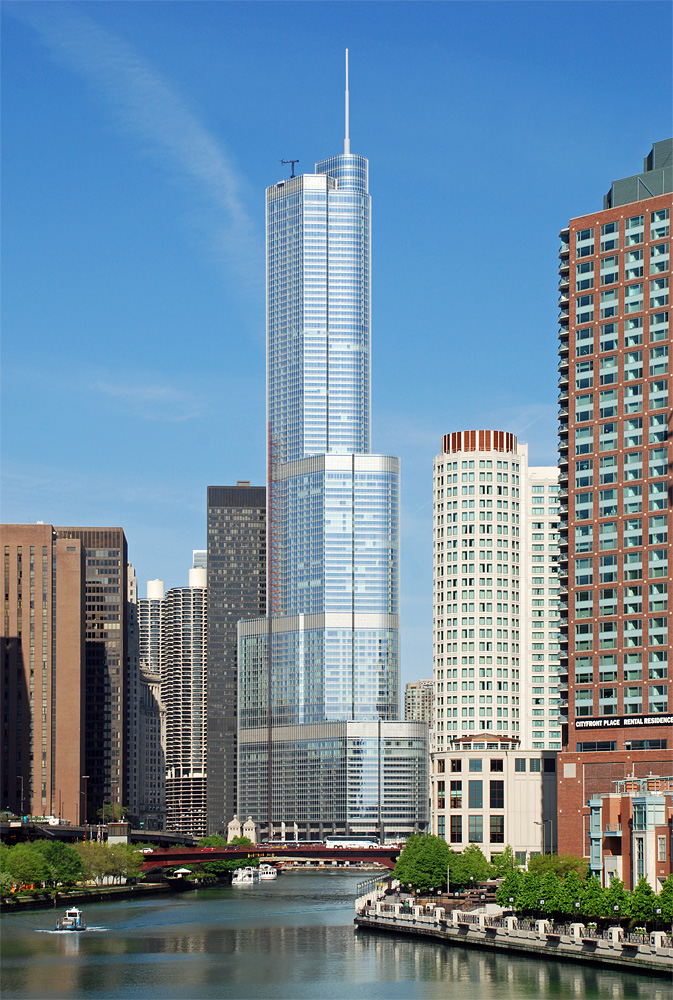
Trump International Hotel and Tower

== Indiana ==
- Blue Chip Casino, Hotel and Spa
- French Lick Resort Casino
- French Lick Springs Hotel
- McCurdy Hotel
- Terre Haute House
- West Baden Springs Hotel

=== Indianapolis ===
- Canterbury Hotel
- Conrad Indianapolis
- Fletcher Trust Building
- Hilton Indianapolis
- Hyatt Regency Indianapolis
- JW Marriott Indianapolis
- Marriott Indianapolis
- Omni Severin Hotel
- Spink Arms Hotel
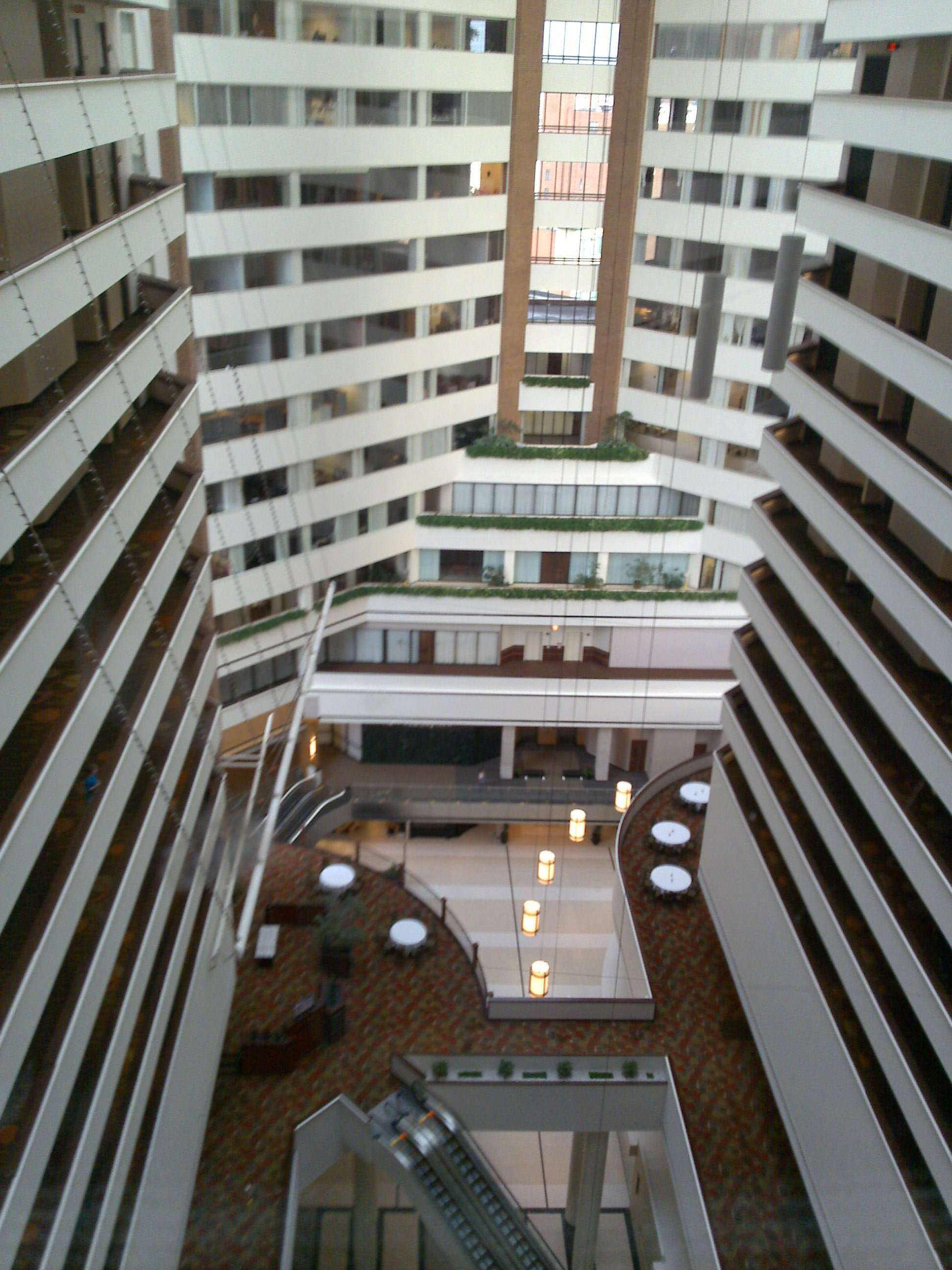
Hyatt Regency Indianapolis

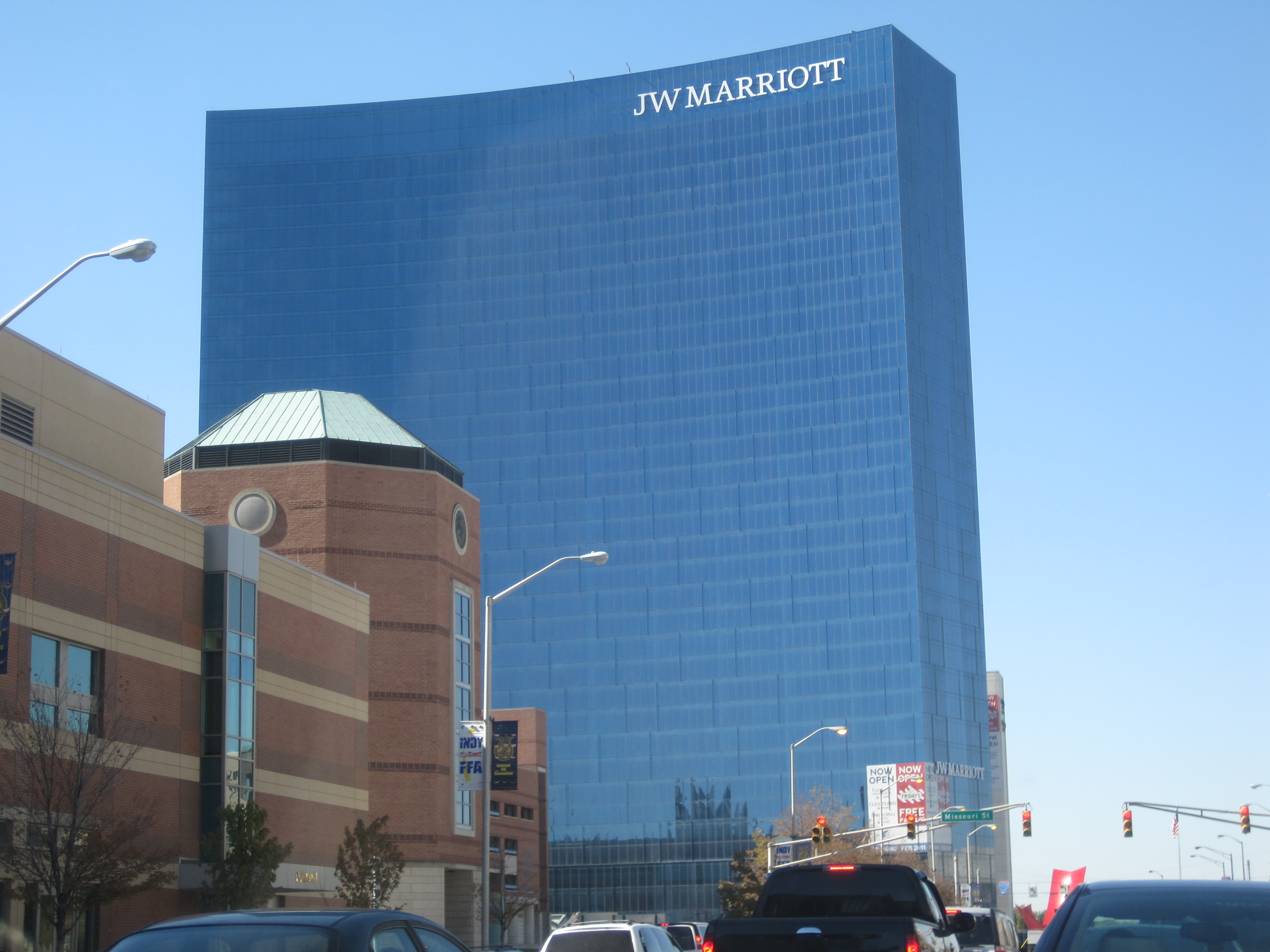
JW Marriott Indianapolis

== Iowa ==
- Black Hawk Hotel
- Burtis-Kimball House Hotel/Burtis Opera House
- Davenport Hotel
- Des Moines Marriott Hotel
- Elks-Rogers Hotel
- German American Heritage Center
- Grand Harbor Resort and Waterpark
- Heartland Inn
- Hotel Blackhawk
- Hotel Fort Des Moines
- Hotel Iowa
- Hotel Julien Dubuque
- Hotel Kirkwood
- Hotel Mississippi-RKO Orpheum Theater
- Hotel Ottumwa
- Hotel Randolph
- Hotel Roosevelt (Cedar Rapids, Iowa)
- Hotel Tallcorn
- Lenox Hotel (Lenox, Iowa)
- Martin Hotel (Sioux City, Iowa)
- Northwestern Hotel
- Park House Hotel
- Park Inn Hotel
- Park Motel
- Randolph Hotel
- Savery Hotel
- Schauder Hotel
- Wahkonsa Hotel
- Warrior Hotel
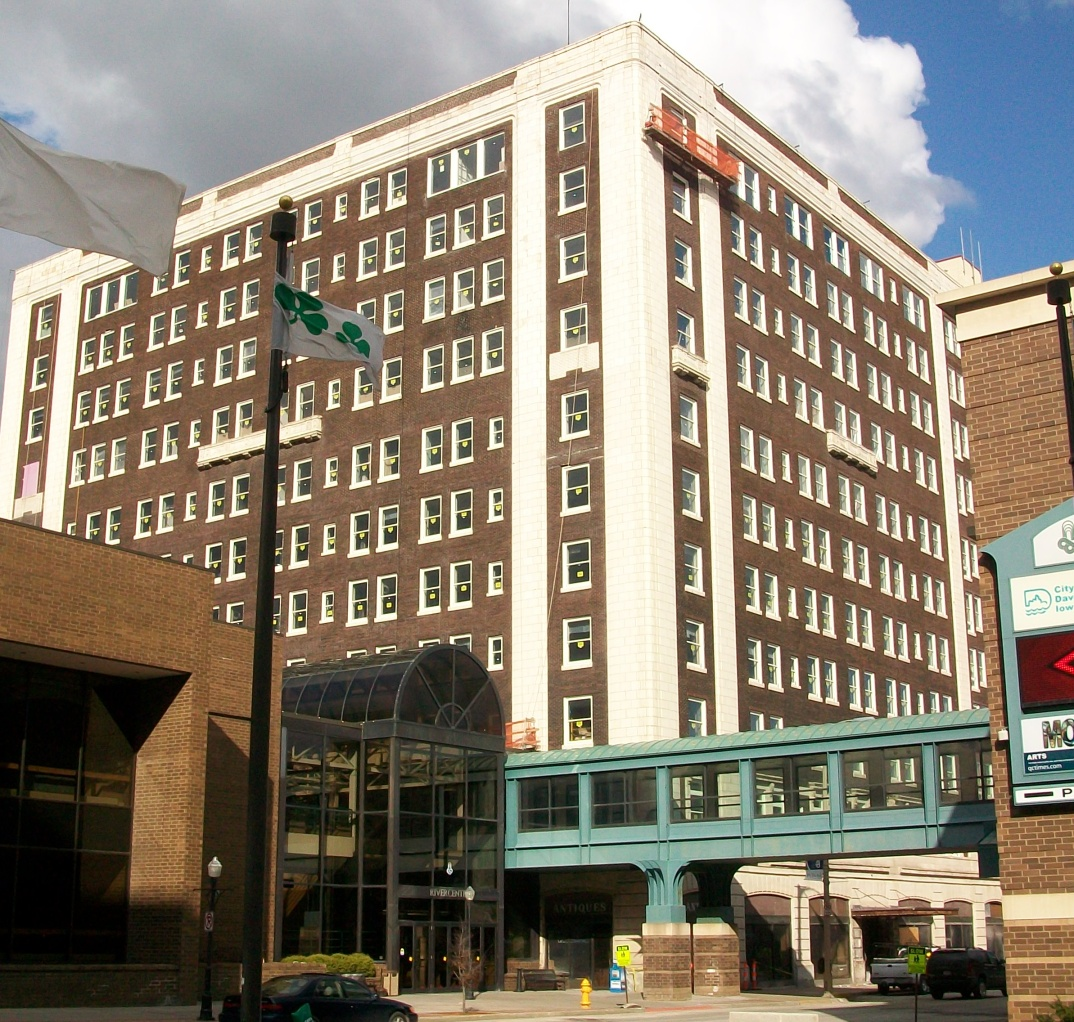
Blackhawk Hotel

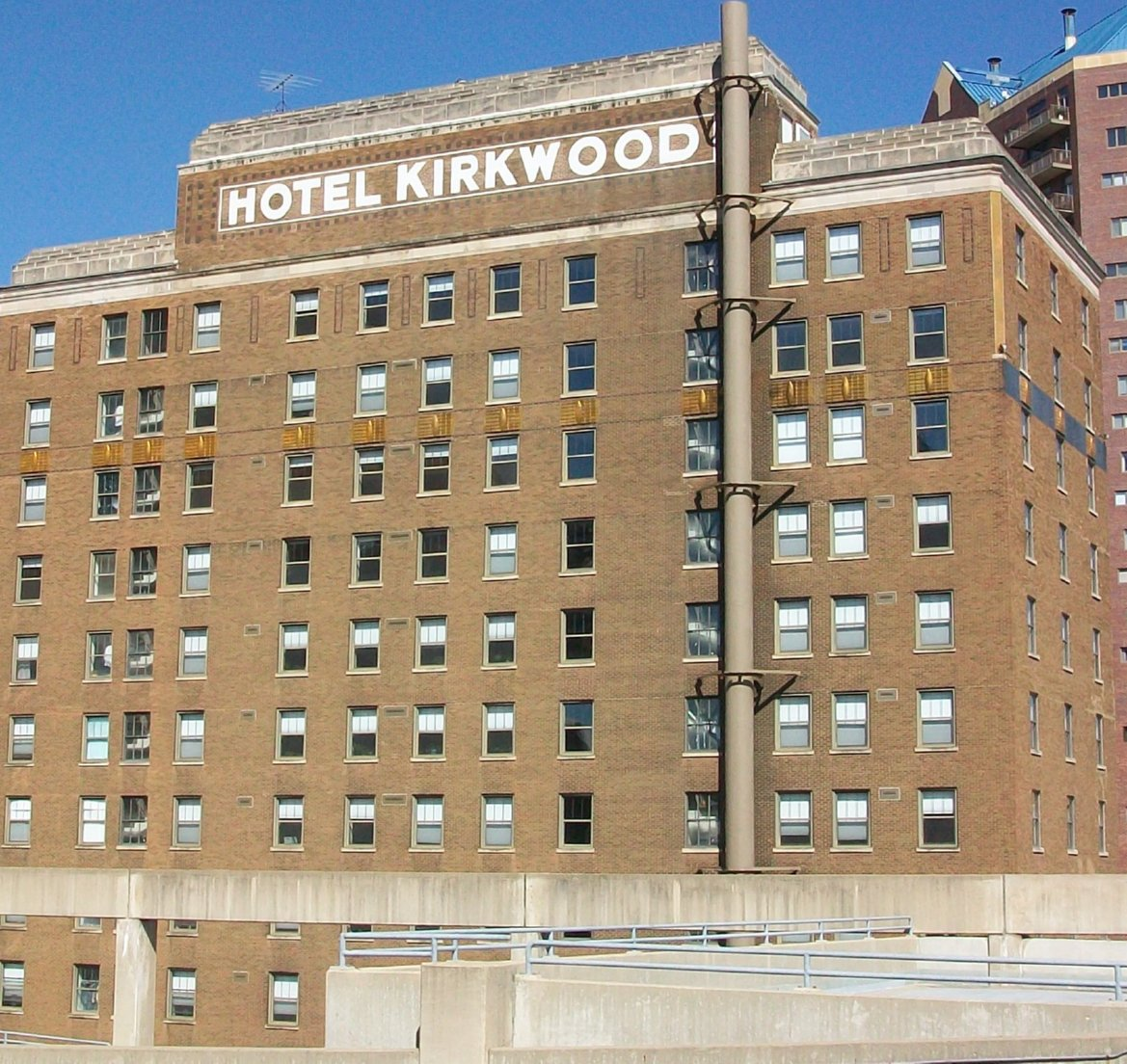
Hotel Kirkwood

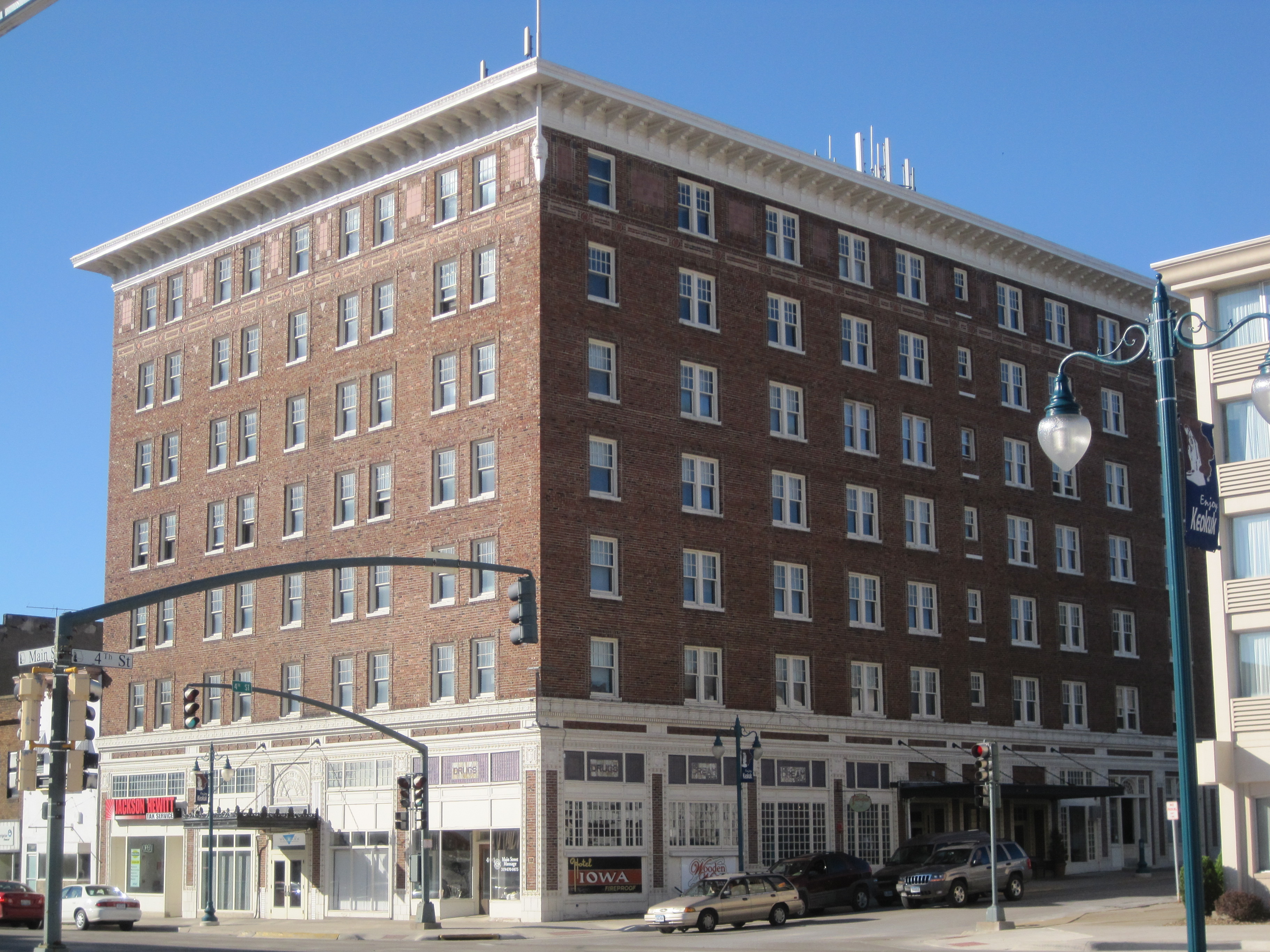
Hotel Iowa

== Kansas ==
- Chateau Avalon
- Cimarron Hotel
- Hotel at Old Town
- Prairie Band Casino & Resort
- Weaver Hotel
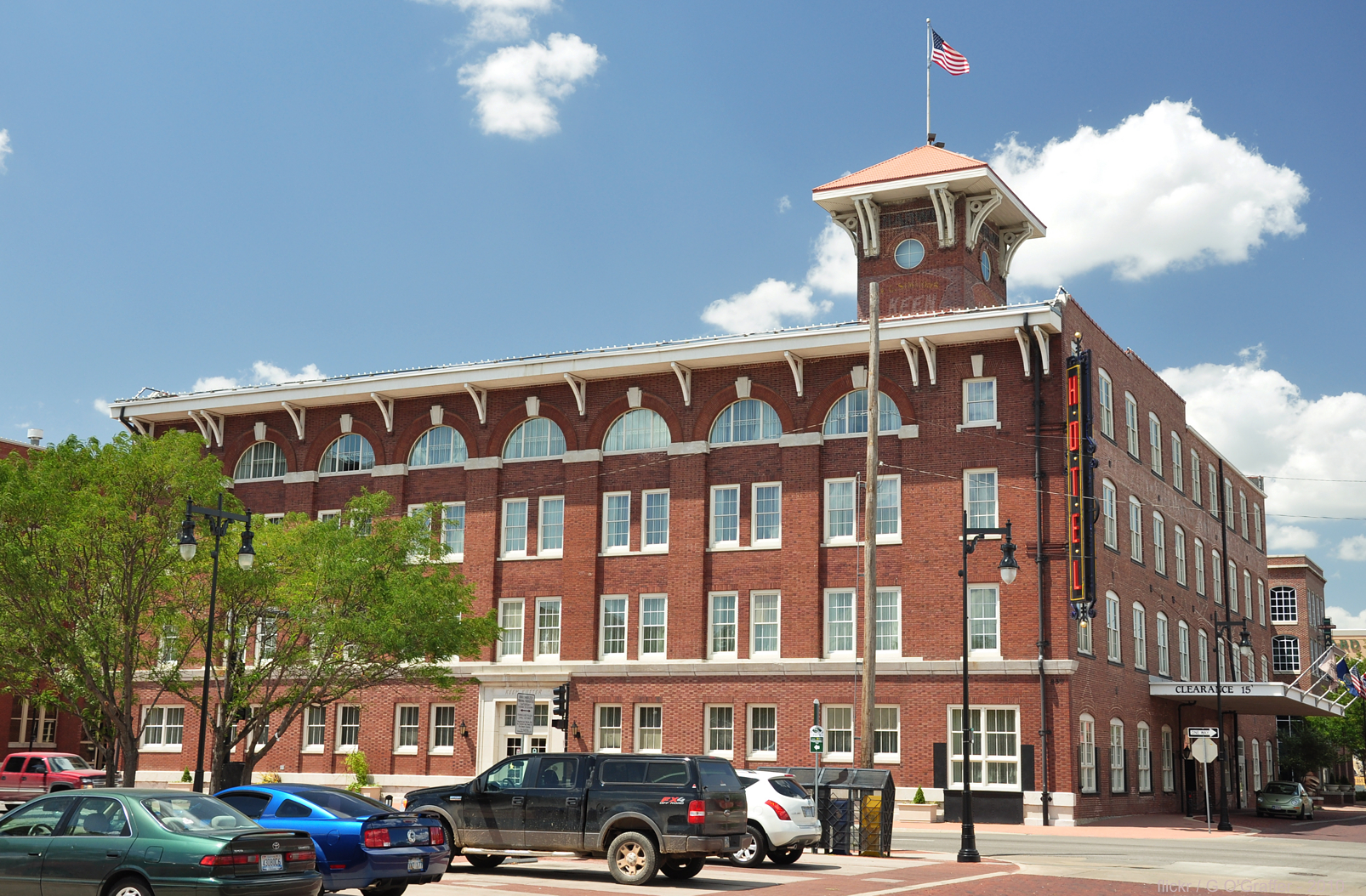
Hotel at Old Town

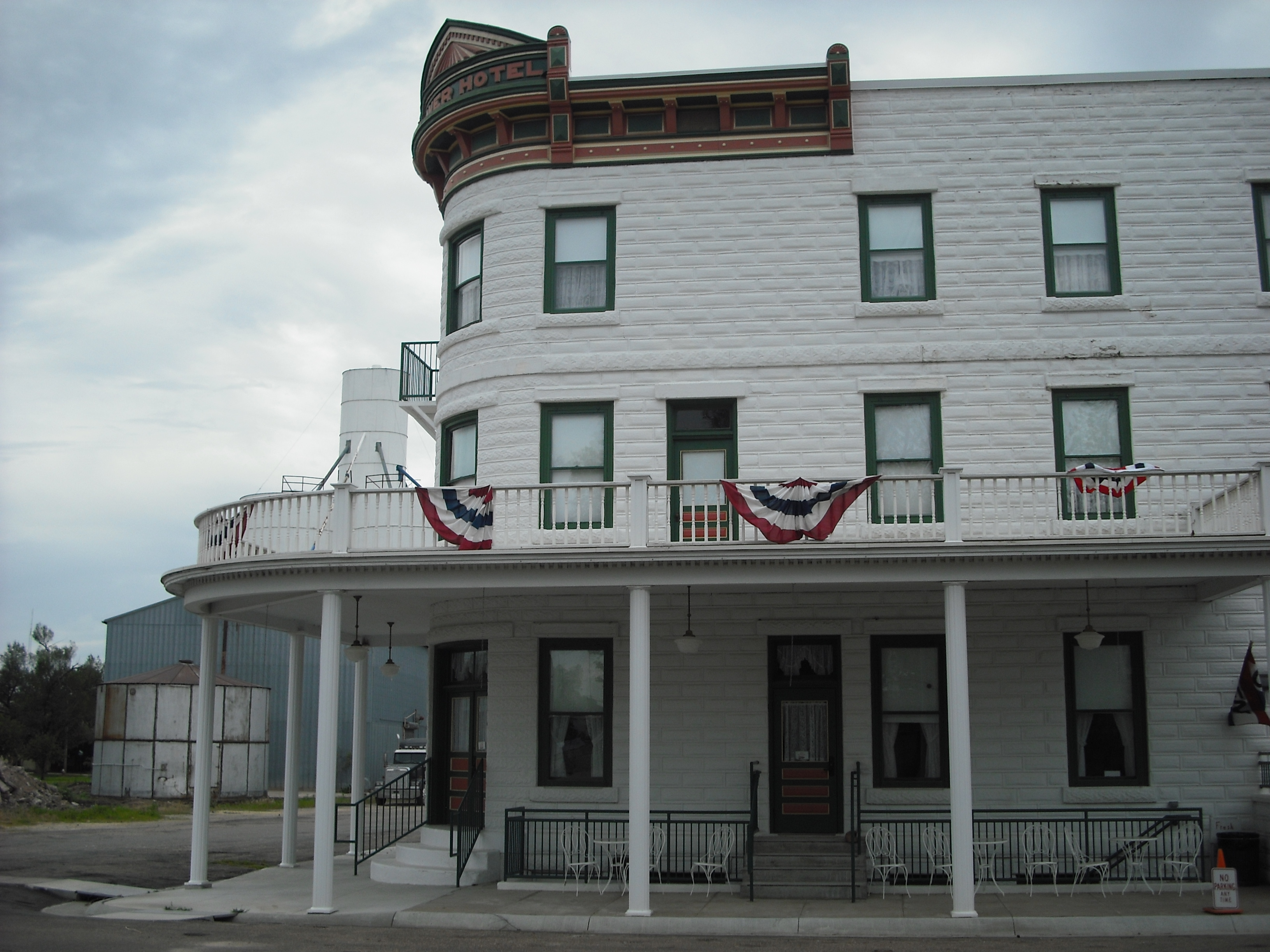
Weaver Hotel

== Kentucky ==
- 21c Museum Hotel
- Boone Tavern
- Brown Hotel
- Castle Post
- Doe Run Inn
- Galt House
- Glyndon Hotel
- Hilton Lexington/Downtown
- Keene Springs Hotel
- Merchant Tower
- Nancy Lincoln Inn
- New Sherwood Hotel
- Old Talbott Tavern
- Phoenix Hotel
- Seelbach Hotel
- Tyler Hotel
- Wigwam Motel
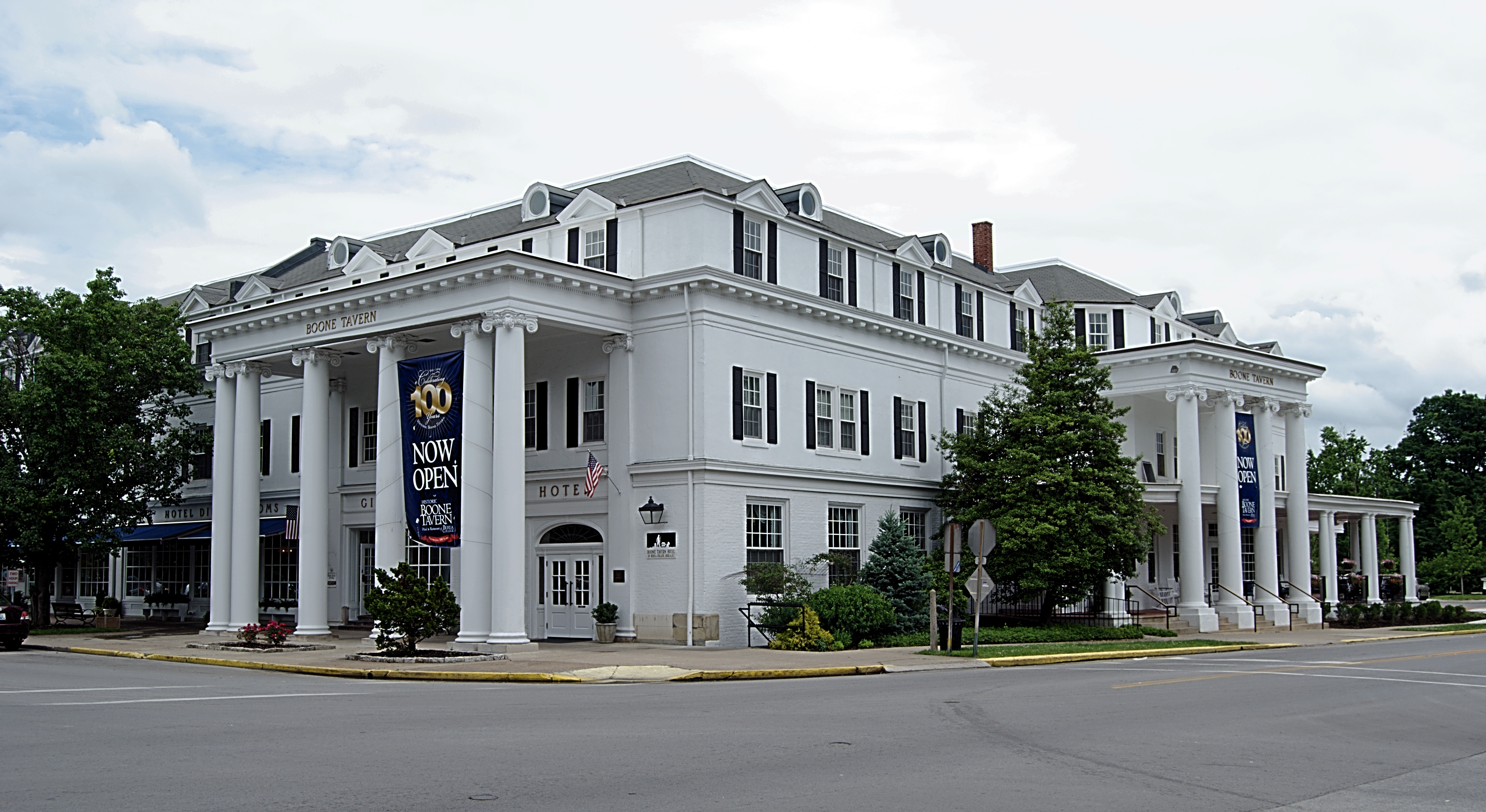
Boone Tavern

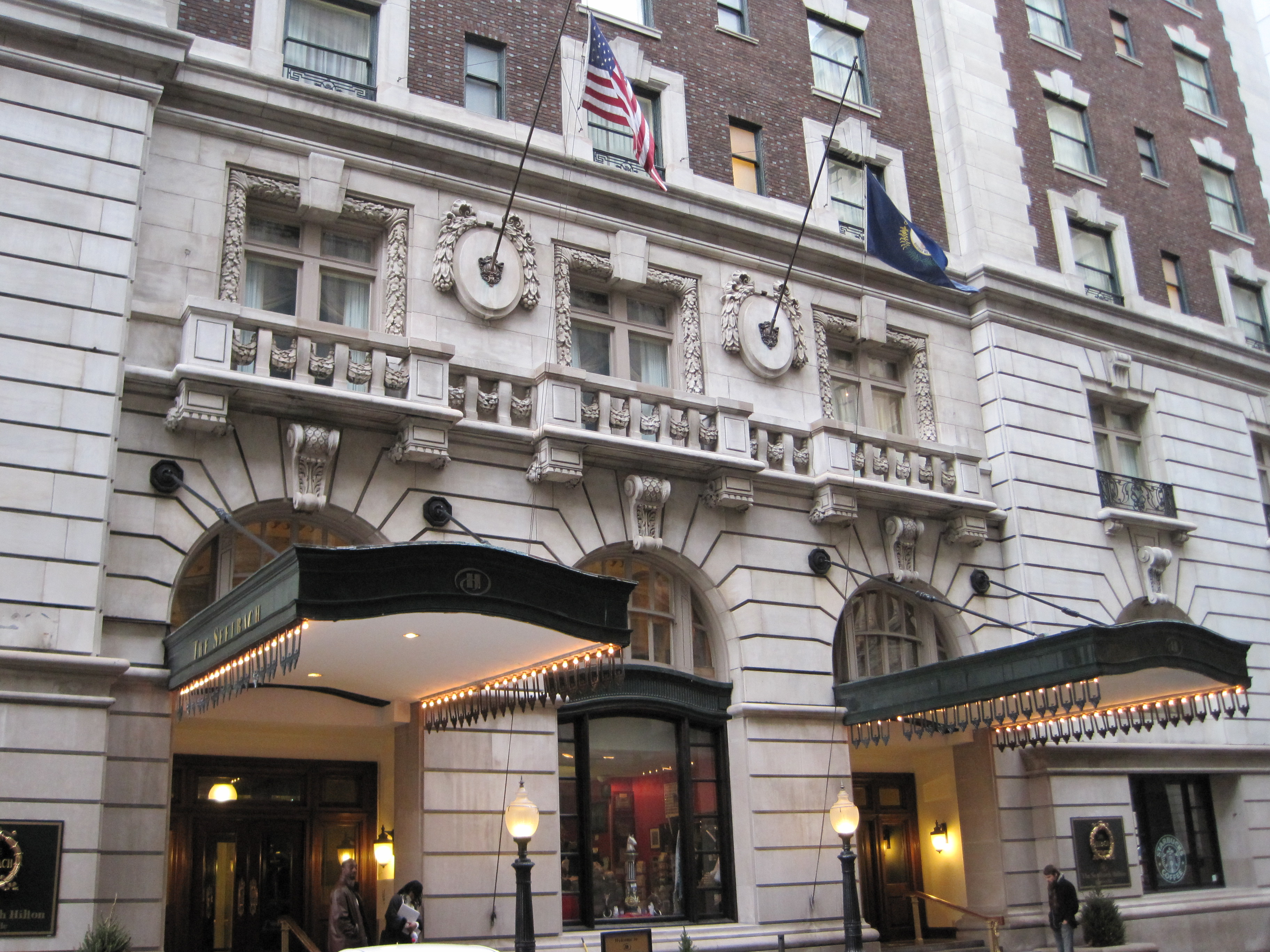
Seelbach Hotel

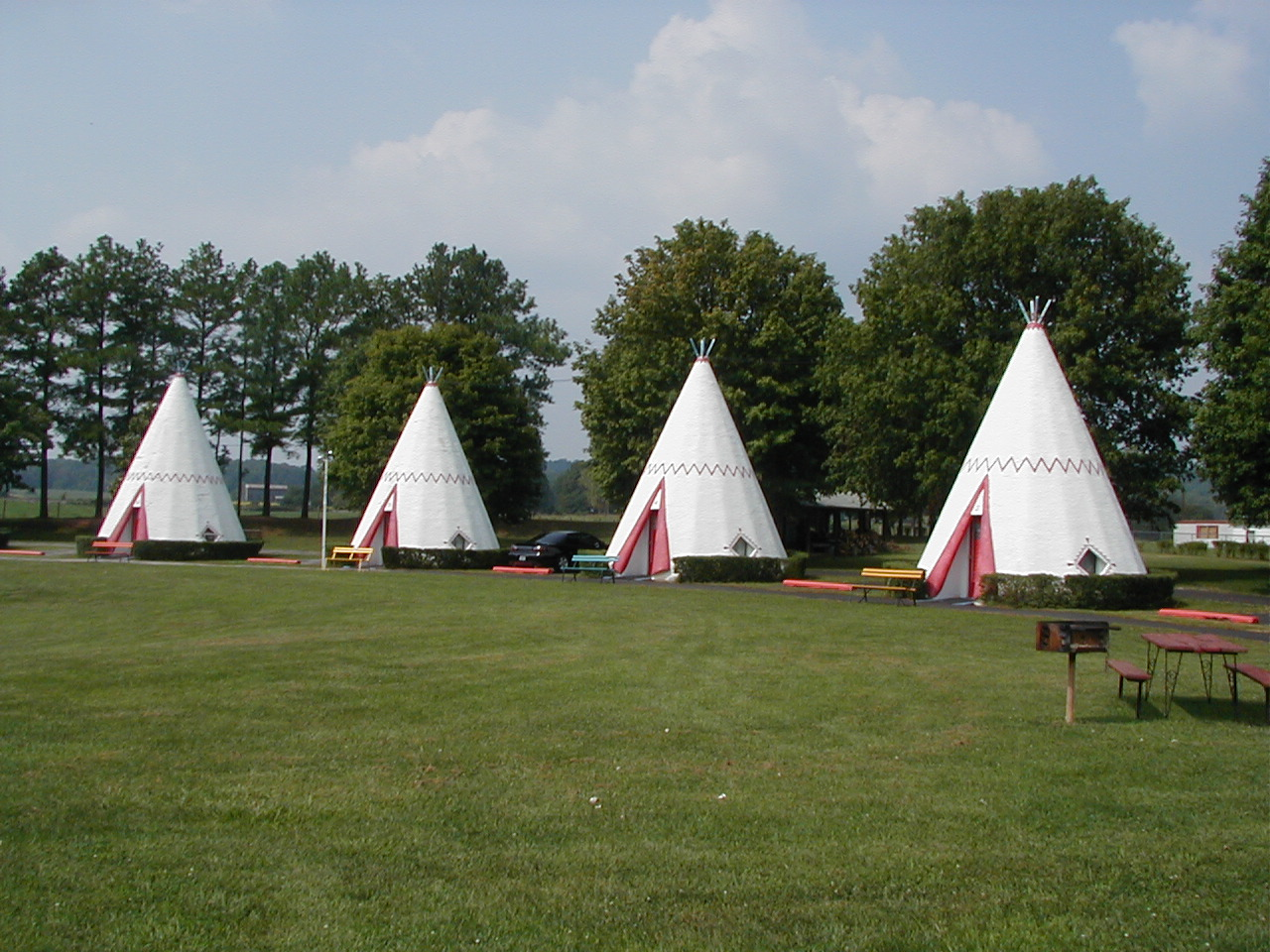
Wigwam Motel

== Louisiana ==
- Hilton Capitol Center
- L'Auberge Baton Rouge
- L'Auberge du Lac Resort
- Sam's Town Hotel and Gambling Hall, Shreveport

=== New Orleans ===
- Chateau Bourbon
- Grand Palace Hotel, New Orleans
- Harrah's New Orleans
- Hilton New Orleans
- Hilton New Orleans Riverside
- Hotel Maison De Ville
- Hotel Monteleone
- Hyatt Regency New Orleans
- JW Marriott Hotel New Orleans
- Le Pavillon Hotel
- New Orleans Marriott
- Omni Royal Orleans
- One Canal Place
- Place St. Charles
- Pontchartrain Hotel
- The Roosevelt New Orleans Hotel
- Sheraton New Orleans
- St. Charles Hotel, New Orleans
- W New Orleans
- Windsor Court Hotel
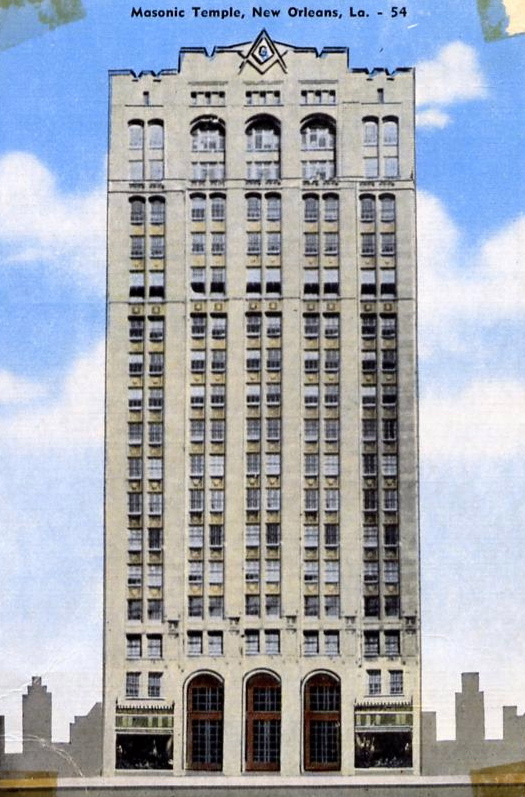
Hilton New Orleans

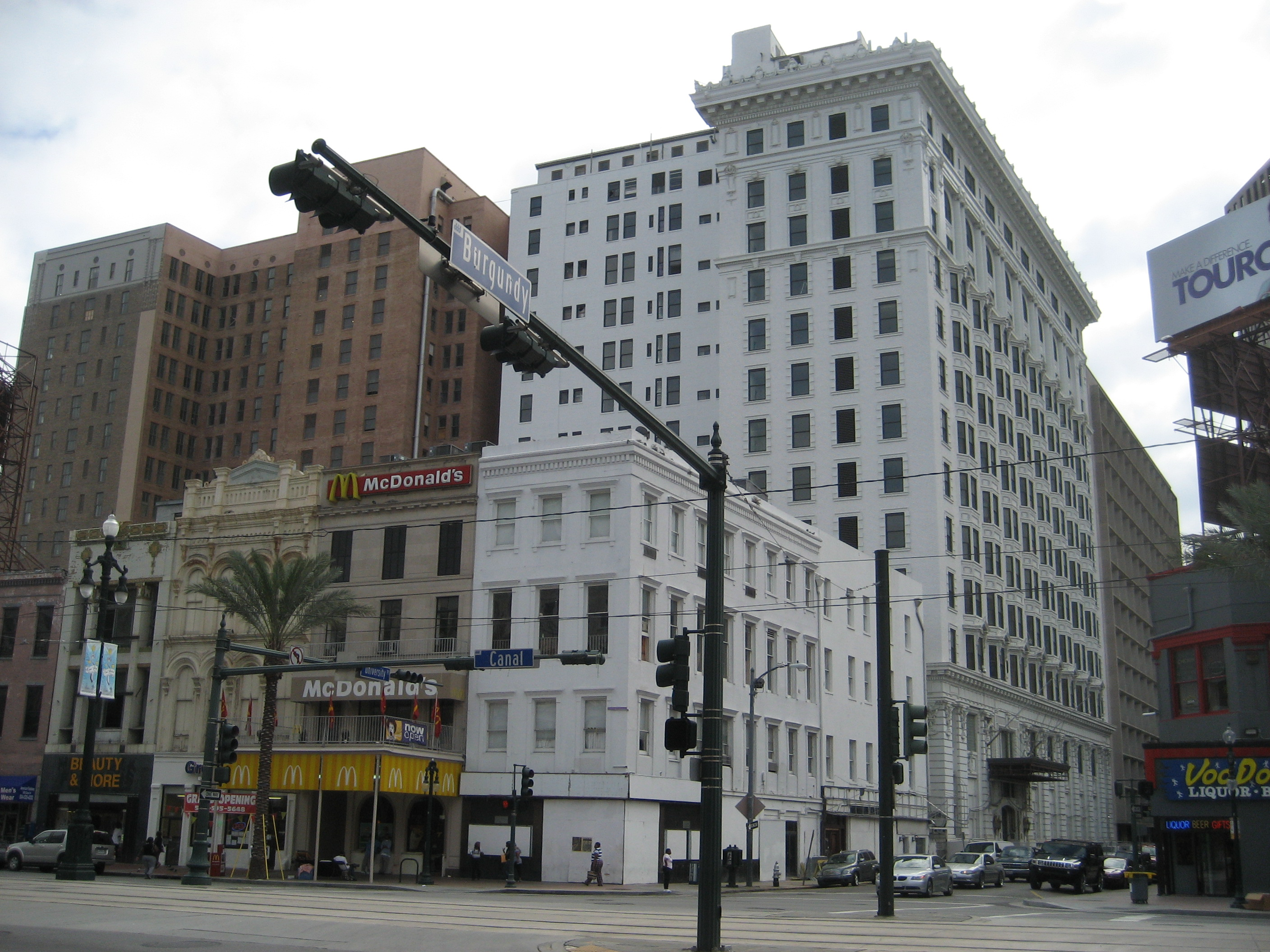
The Roosevelt New Orleans Hotel

== Maine ==
- Bethel Inn Resort
- Mira Monte Inn
- Nickels-Sortwell House
- Seaside Inn
- Sebasco Harbor Resort
- The Westin Portland Harborview
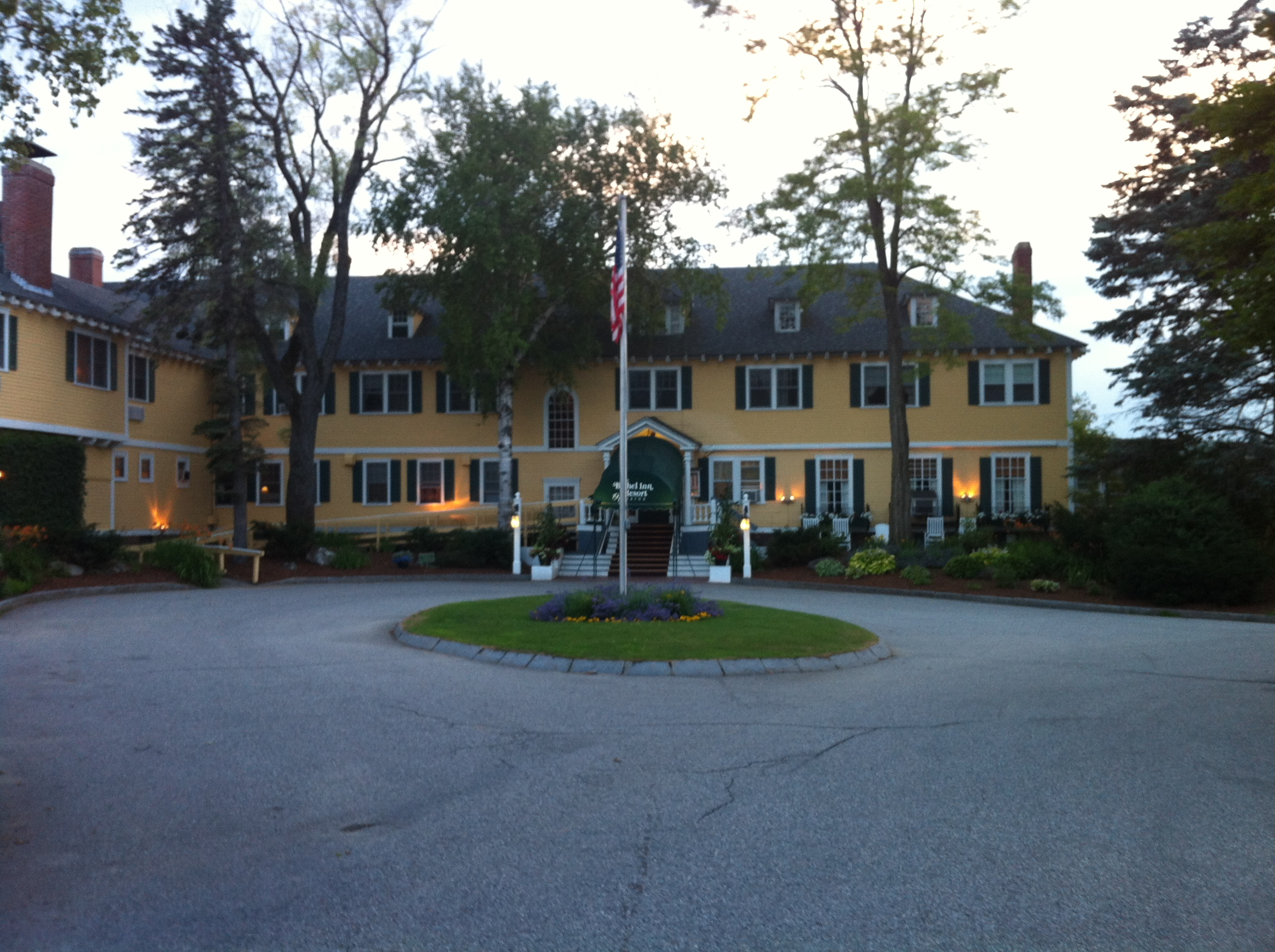
Bethel Inn Resort

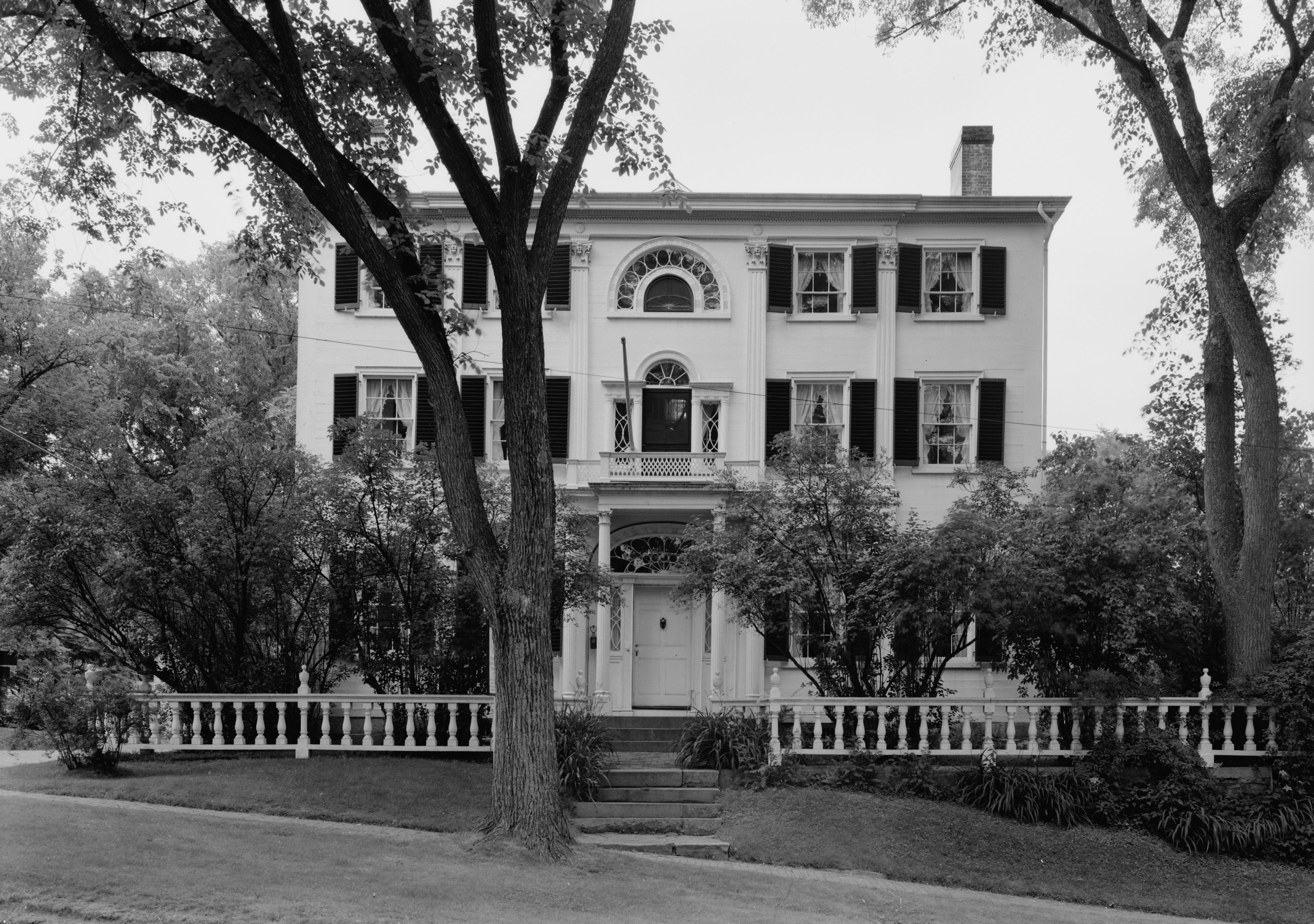
Nickels-Sortwell House

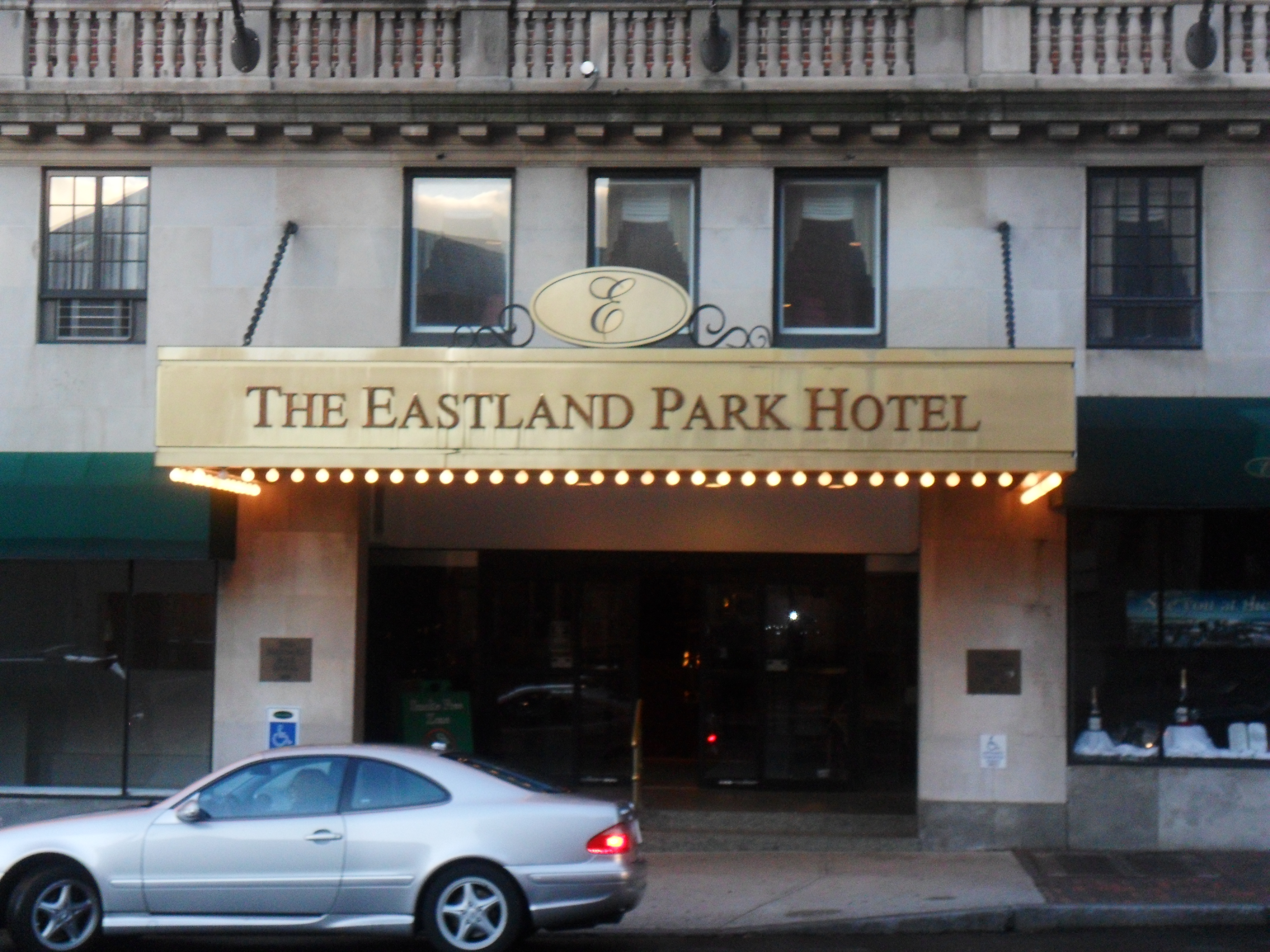
The Westin Portland Harborview

== Maryland ==
- 300 East Pratt Street
- Baltimore Marriott Waterfront Hotel
- Belvedere Hotel
- Brooklandville House
- Deer Park Hotel
- Four Seasons Baltimore and Residences
- Gaylord National Resort & Convention Center
- George Washington House
- Glen Oak Hotel
- Half-Way House (Parkton, Maryland)
- Historic Inns of Annapolis
- Hotel Kernan
- Indian Queen Tavern and Black's Store
- Inn at Perry Cabin
- Inns on the National Road
- Lord Baltimore Hotel
- The Old Inn
- Parkton Hotel
- Queen City Hotel
- Rocky Gap State Park
- Rodgers Tavern
- Sheraton Baltimore City Center
- Sherwood Manor
- Tidewater Inn
- Tremont Plaza Hotel
- Ulysses, Baltimore
- Vue Harbor East
- Whitehaven Hotel
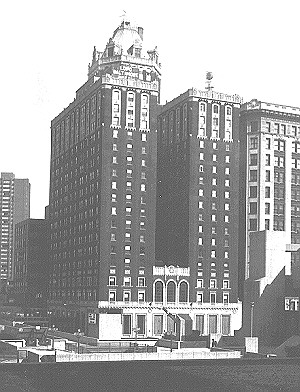
Lord Baltimore Hotel

== Massachusetts ==
- Allen Hotel
- The Andover Inn
- Aurora Hotel
- Bancroft Hotel
- Boston Park Plaza
- Fresh Pond Hotel
- Gilbrae Inn
- Grafton Inn
- The Grandview
- Groton Inn
- Haynes Hotel Waters Building
- Henking Hotel and Cafe
- Hotel Adelaide
- Hotel Kempsford
- Hotel Manger
- Hotel Waverly
- Maplewood Hotel
- Mariners House
- Mary Prentiss Inn
- Mayflower Inn on Manomet Point
- Murray D. Lincoln Campus Center
- New Boston Inn
- Pequoig Hotel
- Railroad Hotel
- Wayside Inn
- Weldon Hotel
- Worthy Hotel
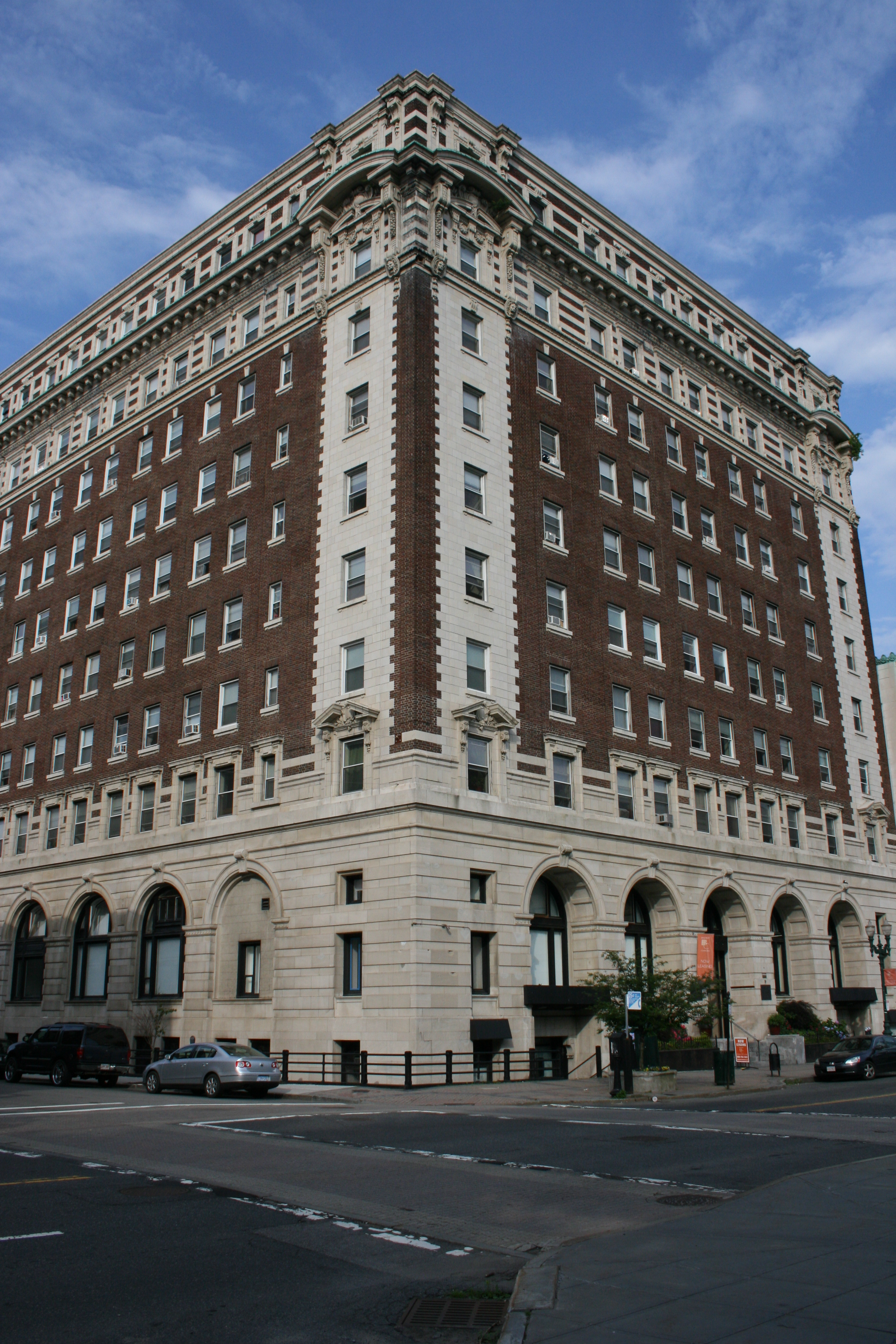
Bancroft Hotel

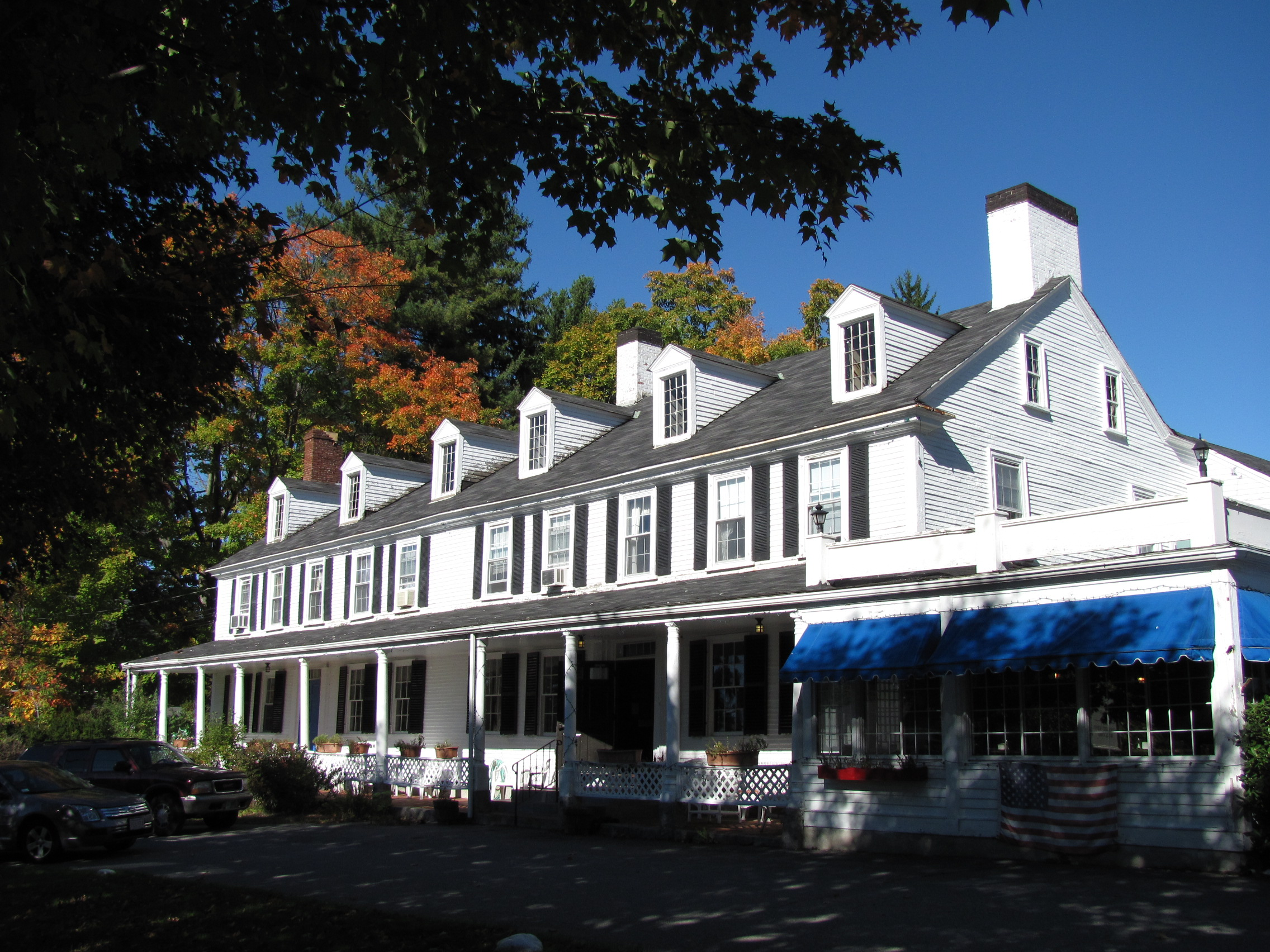
Groton Inn

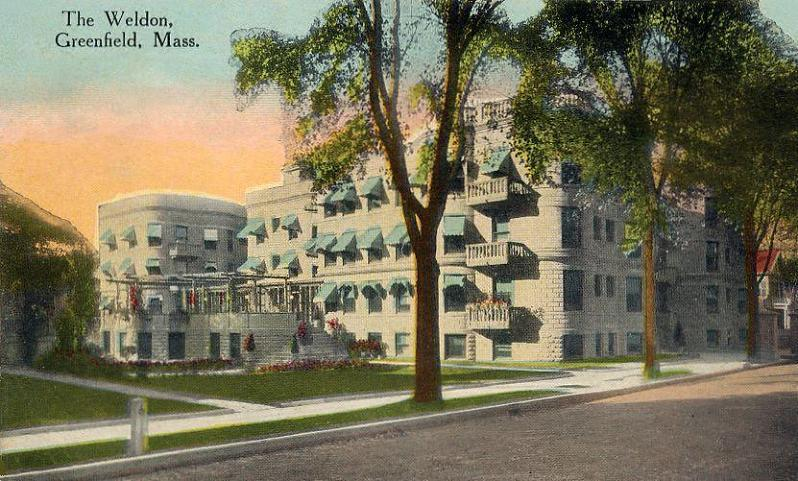
Weldon Hotel

== Michigan ==
- Amway Grand Plaza Hotel
- Davenport House
- Grand Hotel (Mackinac Island)
- Hotel Janzen
- Islington Hotel
- John Chambers House
- JW Marriott Grand Rapids
- Kerns Hotel
- Koch Hotel
- Landmark Inn
- Soaring Eagle Casino
- Stafford's Bay View Inn
- Turtle Creek Casino and Hotel
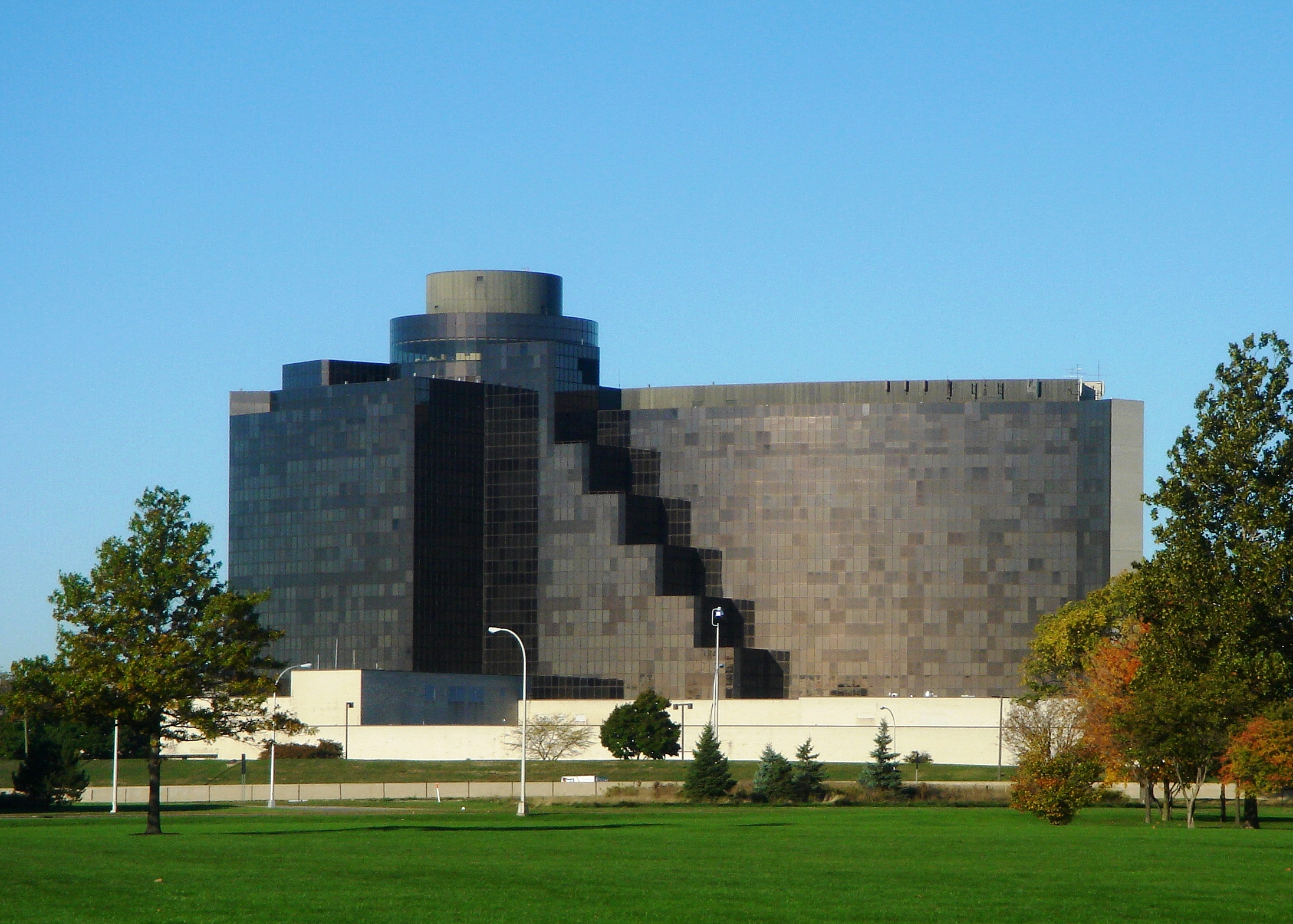
Adoba Hotel Dearborn Detroit

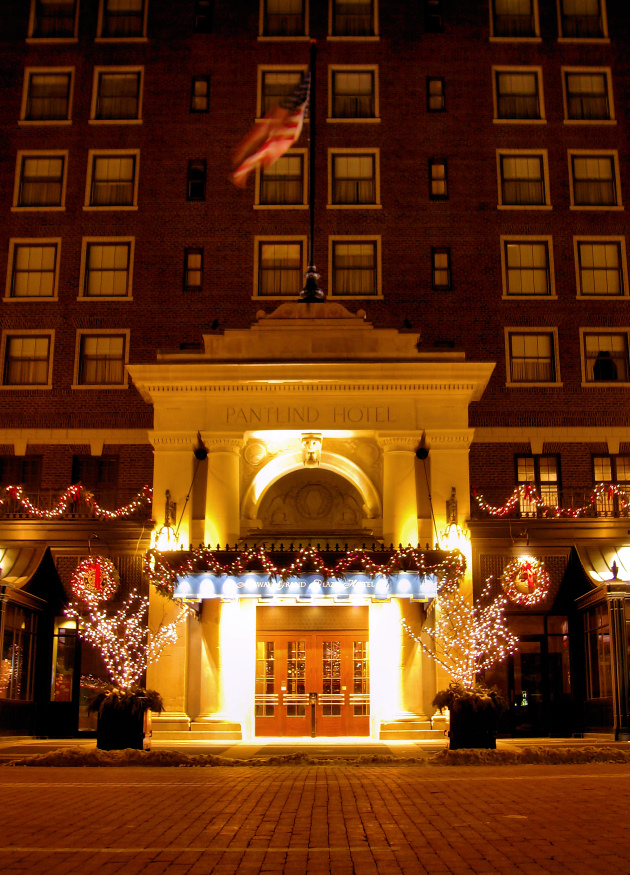
Amway Grand Plaza Hotel

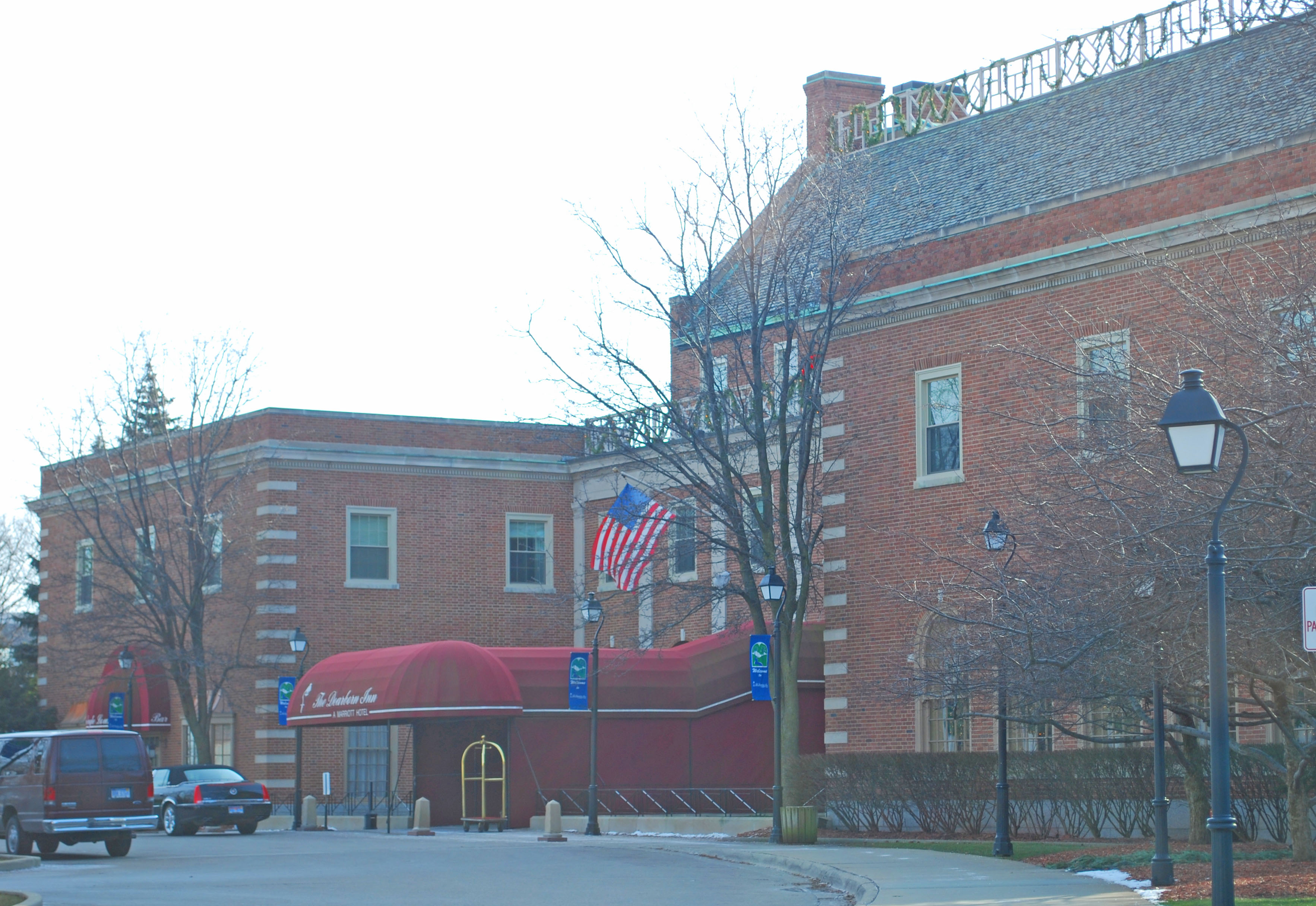
The Dearborn Inn

=== Detroit ===
- Adoba Hotel Dearborn Detroit
- The Dearborn Inn
- Detroit Marriott at the Renaissance Center
- Fort Shelby Hotel
- Greektown Casino Hotel
- Hotel St. Regis Detroit
- Inn at 97 Winder
- Inn at St. John's Plymouth Detroit
- The Leland Hotel
- MGM Grand Detroit
- MotorCity Casino Hotel
- Riverwalk Hotel Detroit
- Royal Park Hotel Rochester Detroit
- Townsend Hotel Birmingham Detroit
- Westin Book Cadillac Hotel
- Westin Southfield Detroit Hotel
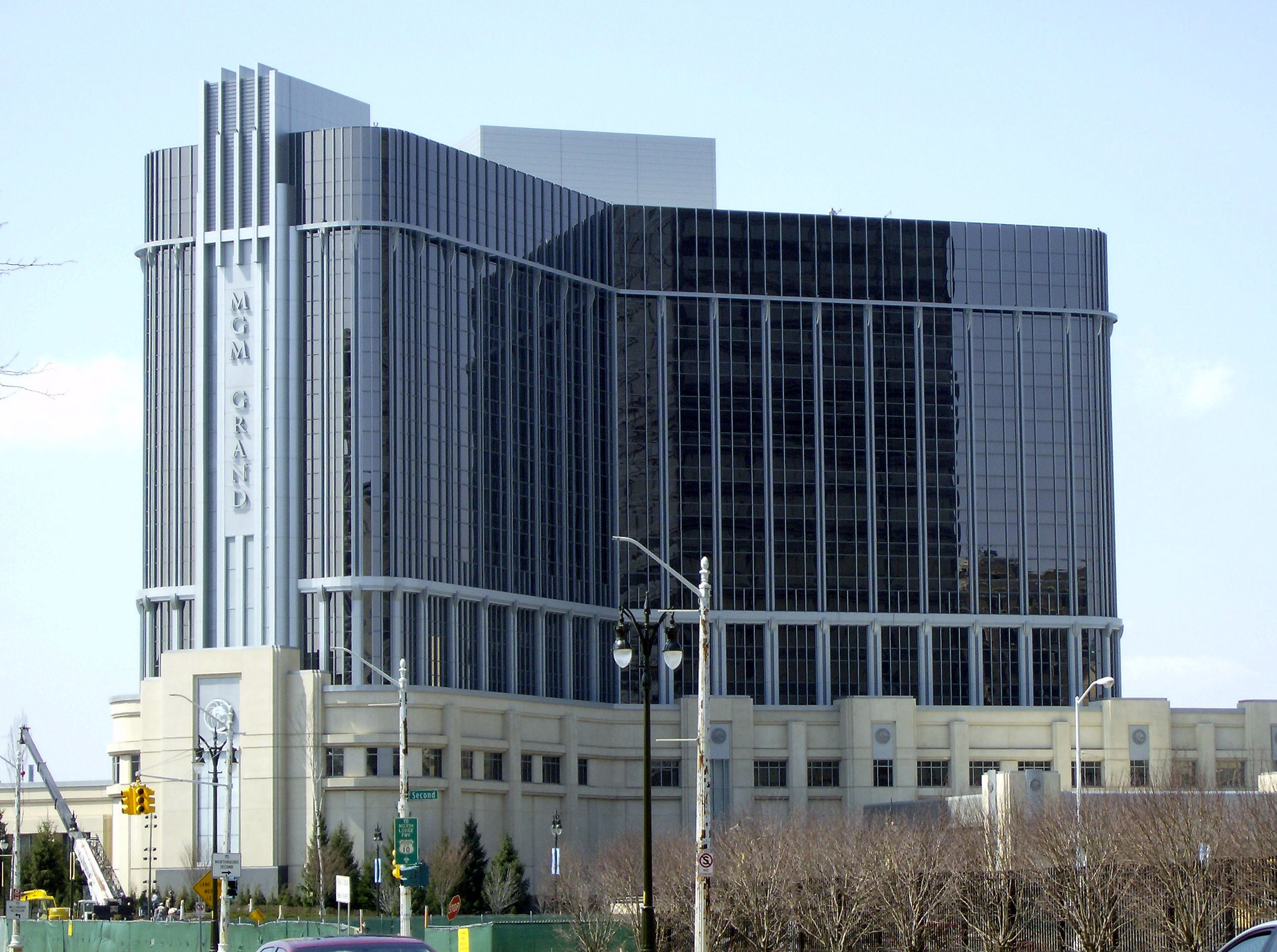
MGM Grand Detroit

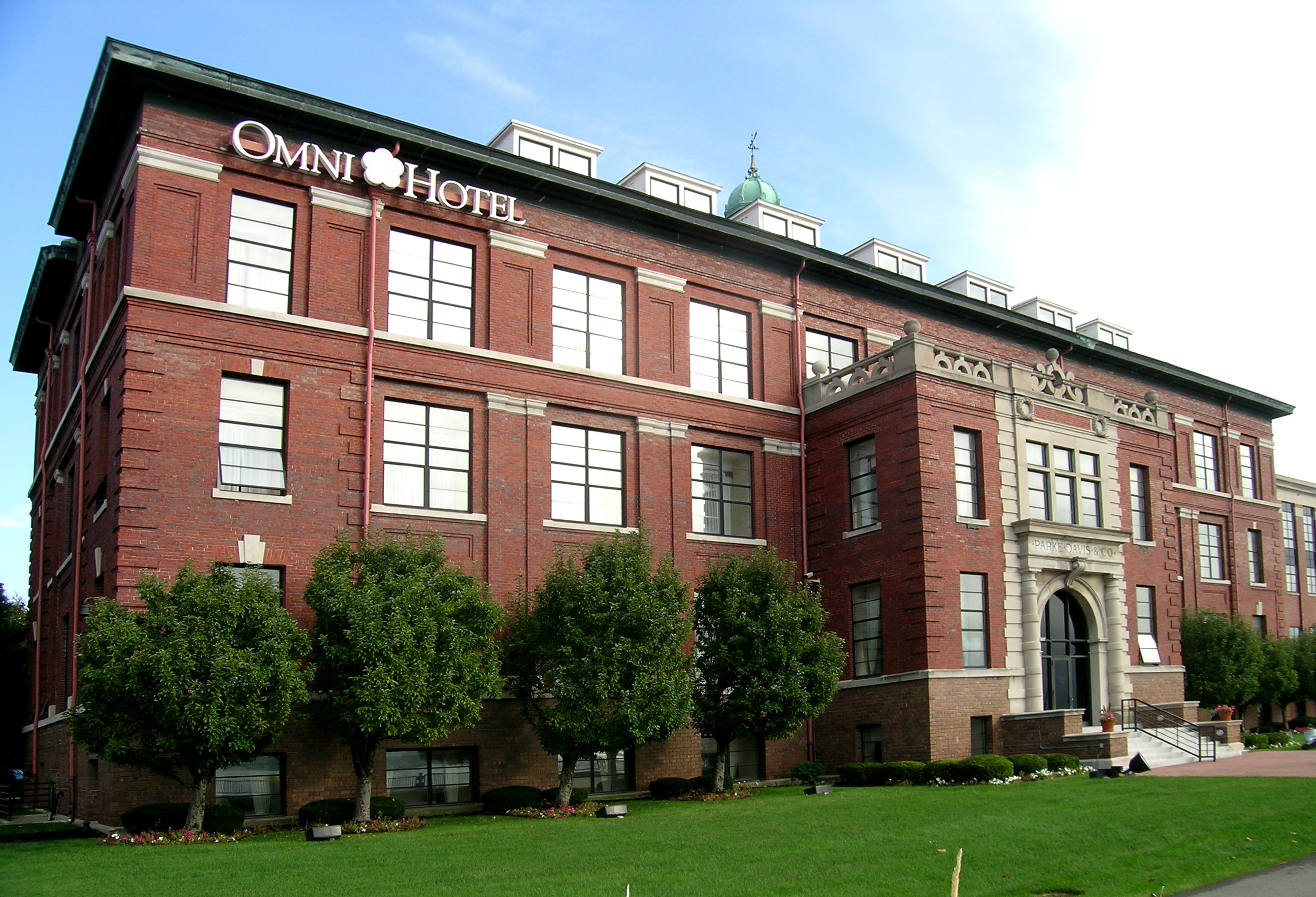
Riverwalk Hotel Detroit

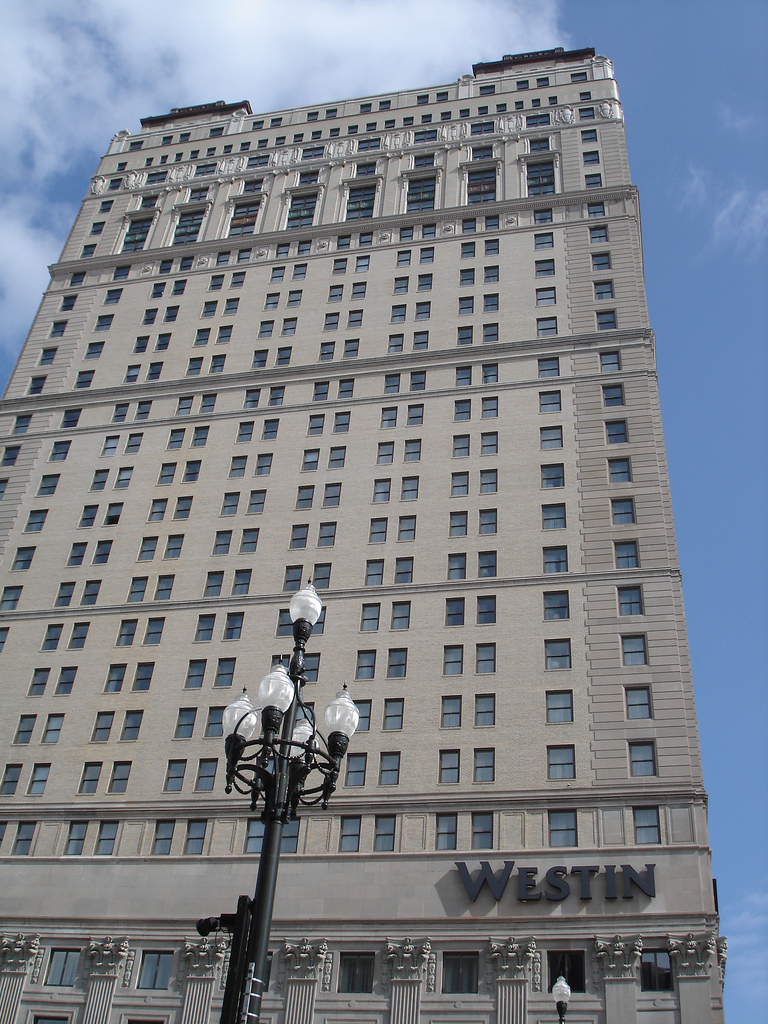
Westin Book Cadillac Hotel

== Minnesota ==
- Avalon Music
- Burntside Lodge
- Calumet Hotel
- Cushing Hotel
- Grand Hotel
- Gunflint Lodge
- Historic Anderson House Hotel
- Kettle Falls Hotel
- Naniboujou Club Lodge
- The Palmer House
- St. James Hotel
- Star Lite Motel
- Thayer Hotel
- Thunderbird Motel
- Water Park of America
- West Hotel
- Winona Hotel
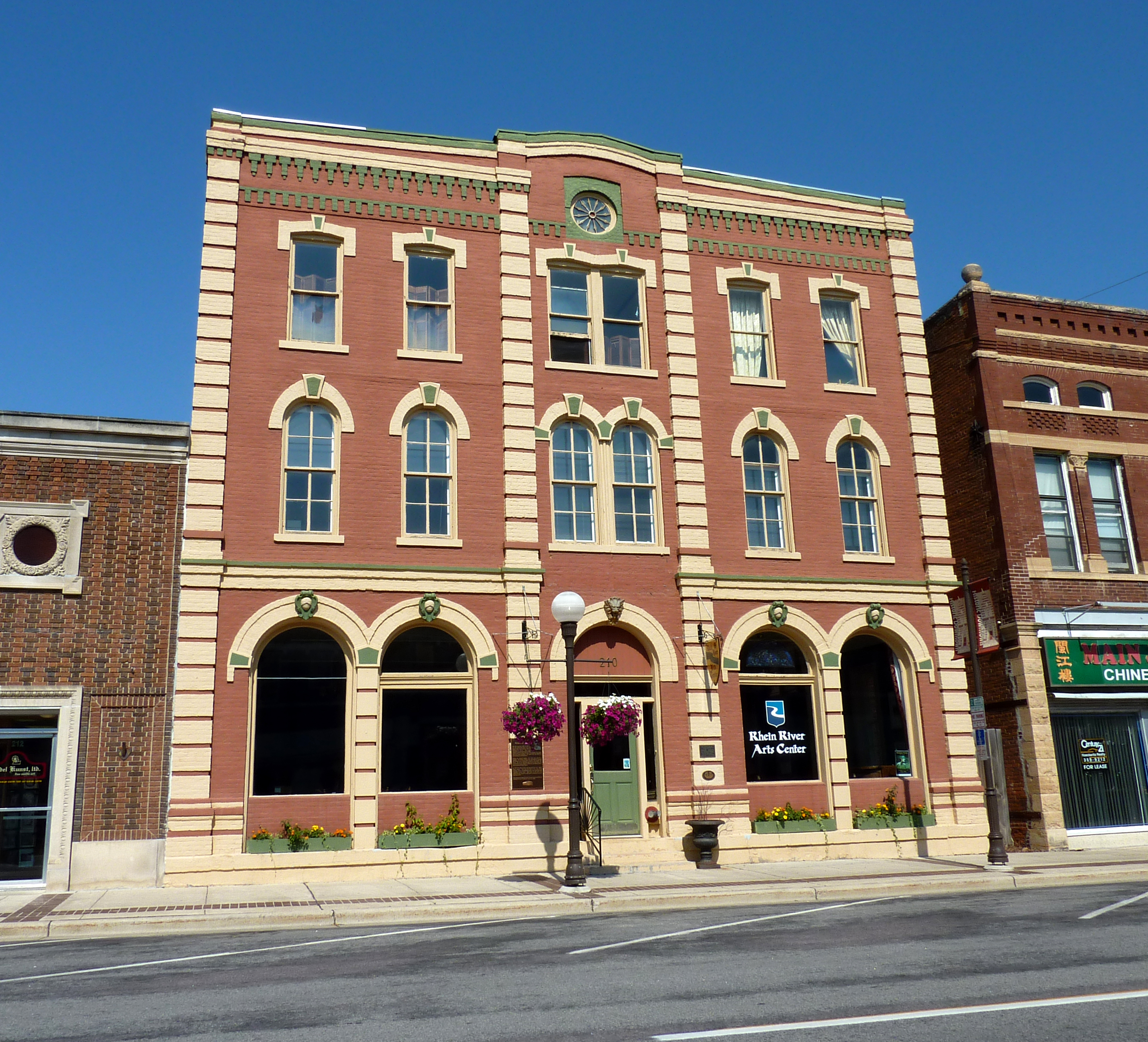
Grand Hotel (New Ulm, Minnesota)

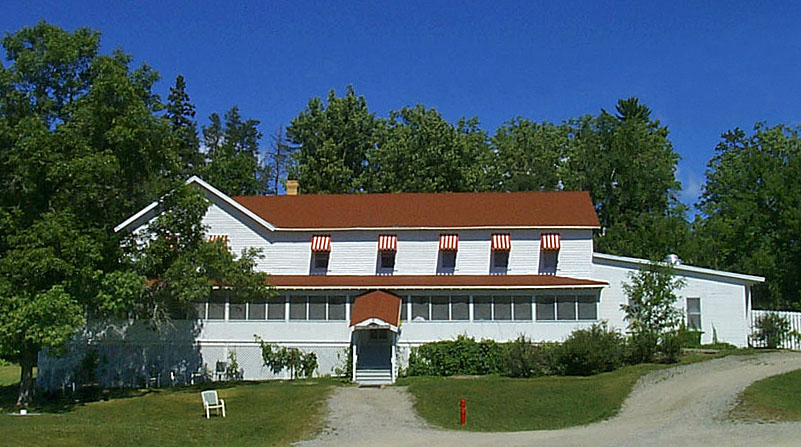
Kettle Falls Hotel

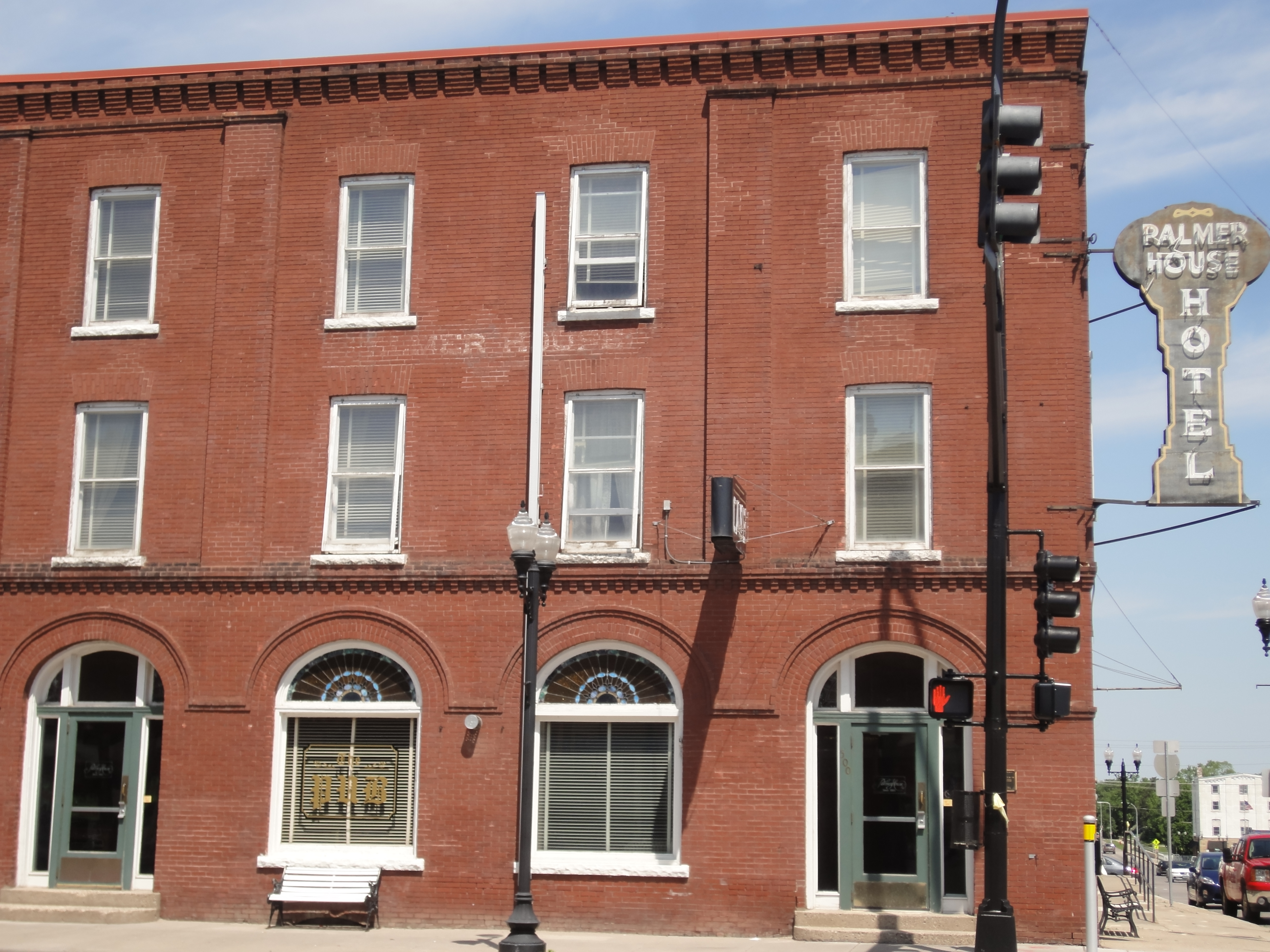
The Palmer House (Sauk Centre)

== Mississippi ==
- Bally's Casino Tunica
- Beau Rivage
- Gold Strike Tunica
- Grand Casino Biloxi
- Grand Casino Gulfport
- Hard Rock Hotel and Casino
- Harlow's Casino Resort
- Harrah's Casino Tunica
- IP Casino Resort & Spa
- Island View Casino
- Jackson Marriott Downtown
- King Edward Hotel
- Resorts Casino Tunica
- Riverside Hotel
- Sam's Town Hotel and Gambling Hall, Tunica
- Summers Hotel and Subway Lounge
- Sun-n-Sand Motor Hotel
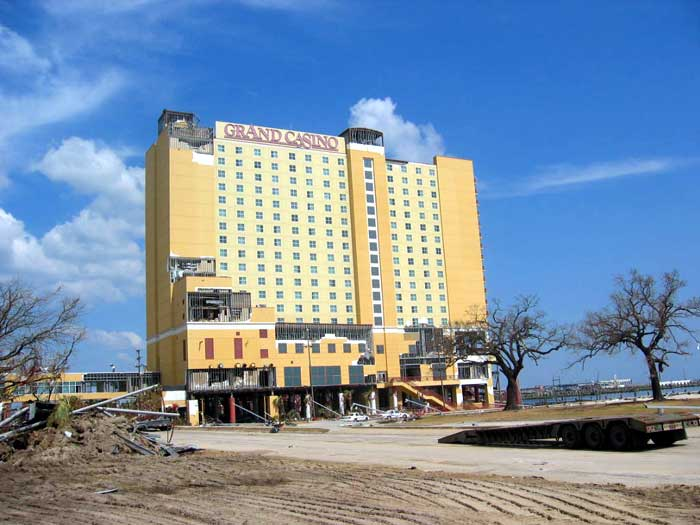
Grand Casino Gulfport

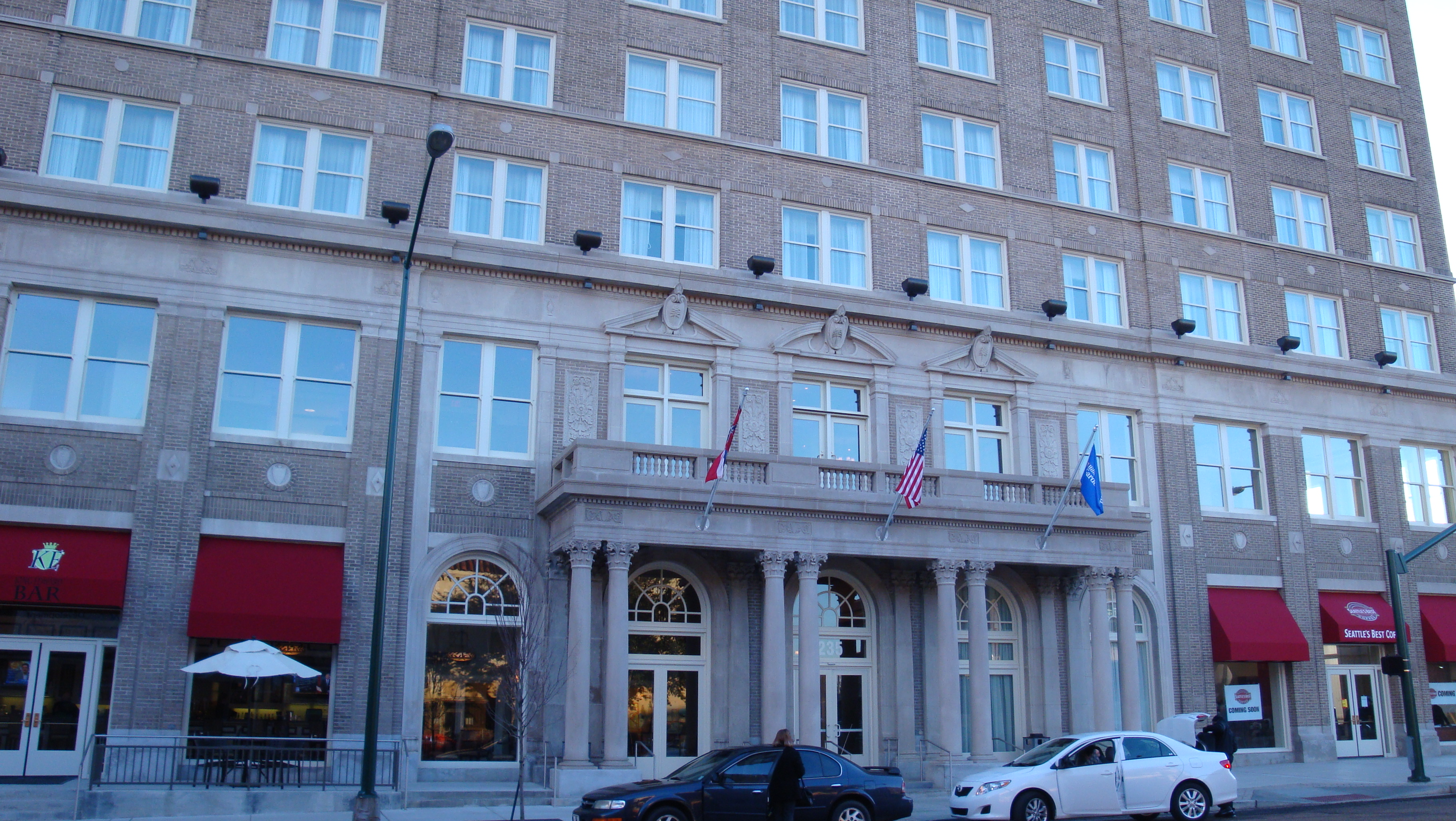
King Edward Hotel (Jackson, Mississippi)

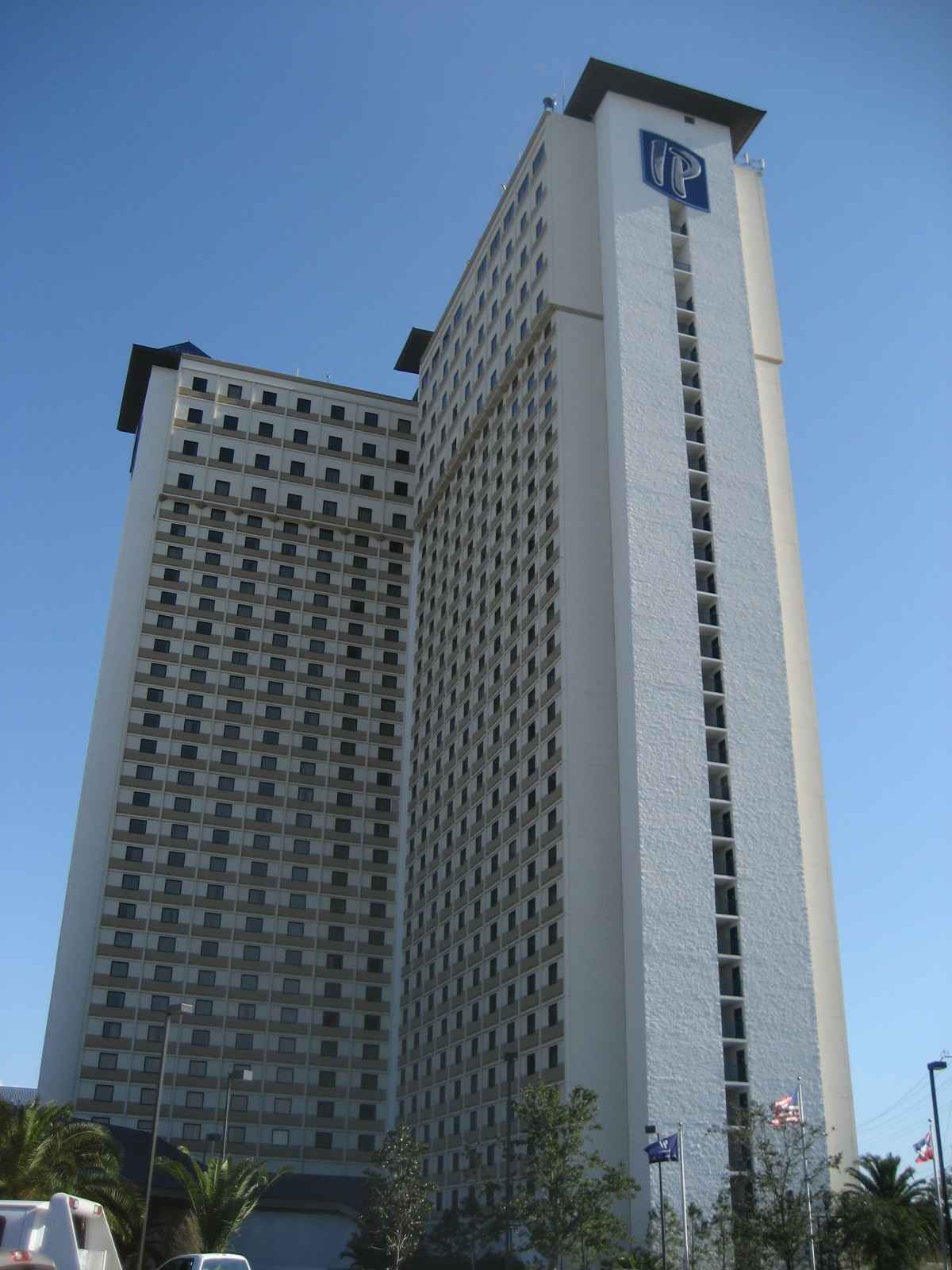
IP Casino Resort & Spa

== Missouri ==
- Ameristar Casino Kansas City
- Buckingham Hotel
- Chase Park Plaza
- Elms Hotel
- Harrah's St. Louis
- Hotel Phillips
- Hotel President
- Isle of Capri Boonville
- Marquette Hotel
- Millennium Hotel St. Louis
- Monroe Hotel
- Muehlebach Hotel
- Newbern Hotel
- Patee House
- Pierce Pennant Motor Hotel
- Sheraton Kansas City Hotel at Crown Center
- Tan-Tar-A Resort
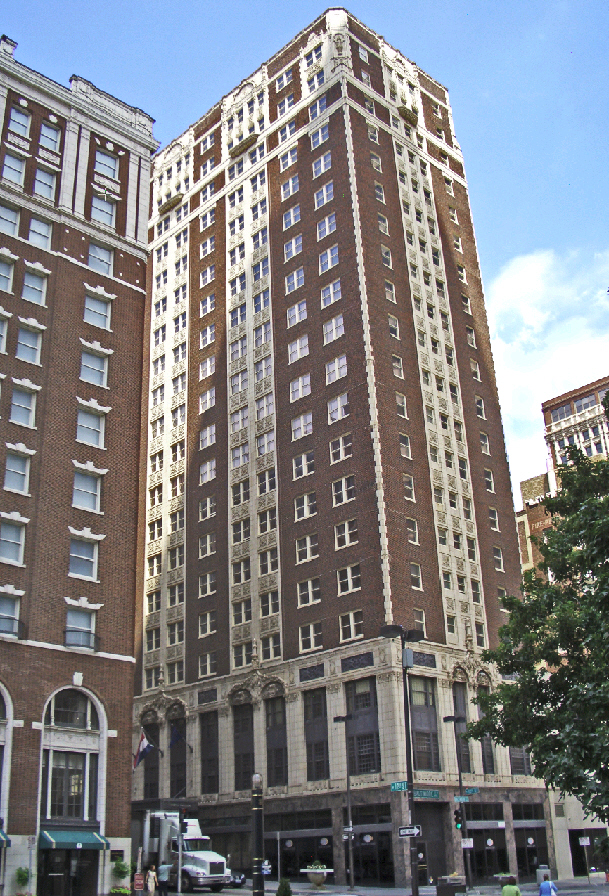
Hotel Phillips

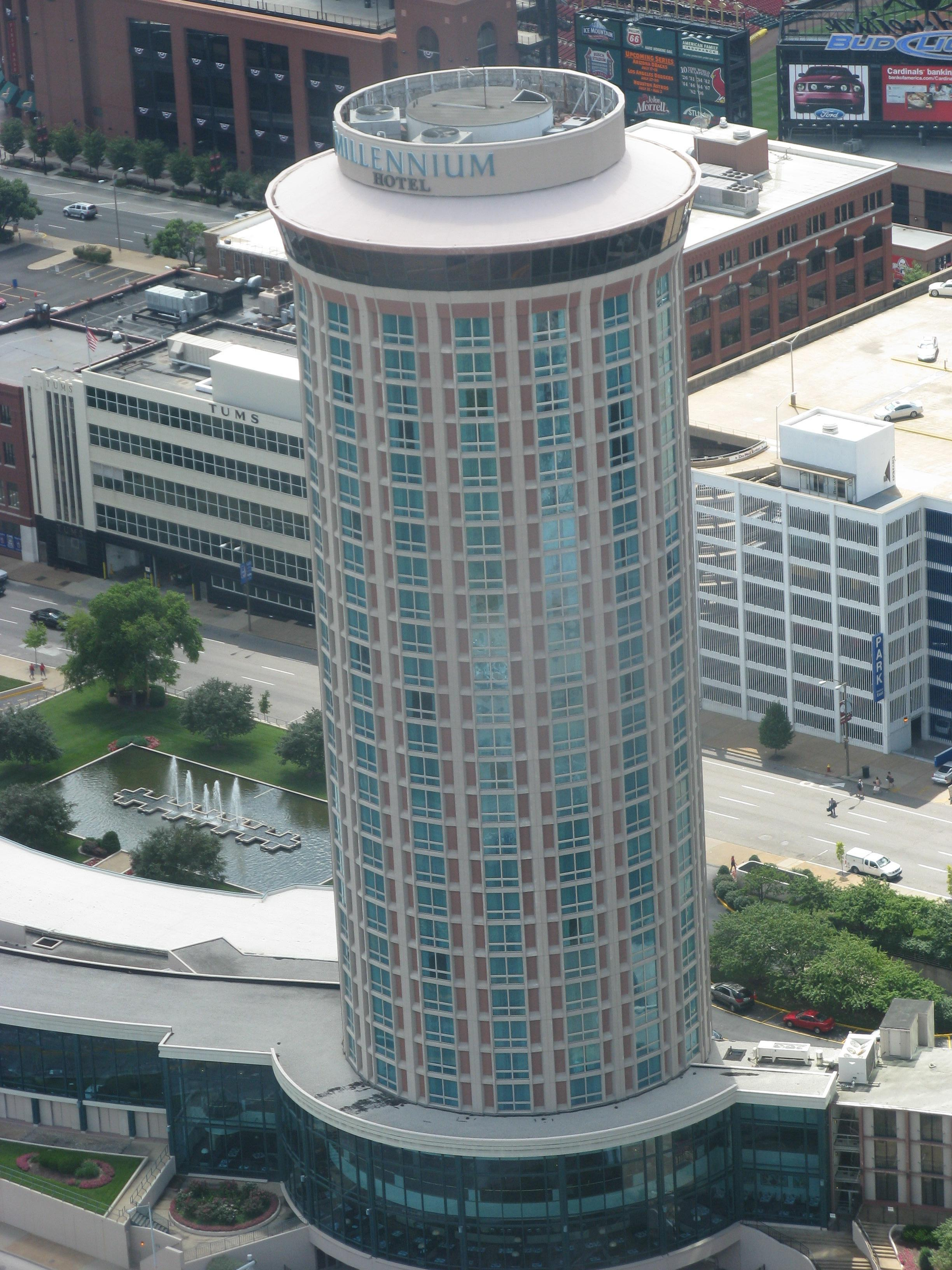
Millennium Hotel St. Louis

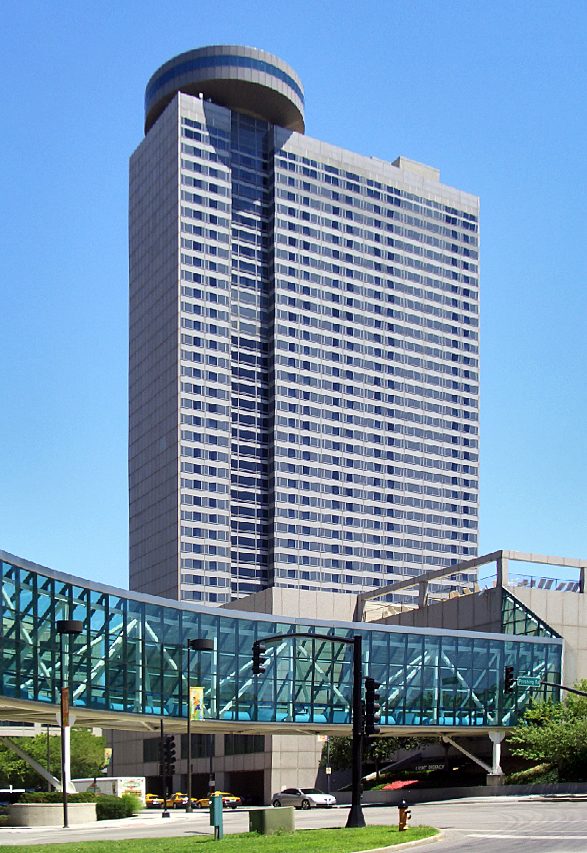
Sheraton Kansas City Hotel at Crown Center

== Montana ==
- Atlantic Hotel
- Belmont Hotel
- Big Sky Resort
- Copper King Mansion
- Crowne Plaza Hotel Billings
- Florence Hotel
- Gallatin Gateway Inn
- Gallatin River Lodge
- Glacier Park Company
- Glacier Park Lodge
- Granite Park Chalet
- Izaak Walton Inn
- Lake McDonald Lodge
- Many Glacier Hotel
- The Murray Hotel
- Radisson Northern Hotel
- Rising Sun Auto Camp
- Roberts Building
- Sacajawea Hotel

== Nebraska ==
=== Omaha ===
- Aquila Court Building
- Blackstone Hotel
- Cozzens House Hotel
- Douglas House (Omaha)
- Flatiron Hotel
- Grand Central Hotel
- Herndon House
- Hotel Fontenelle
- Prague Hotel
- Redick Tower
- St. Nicholas Hotel

== Nevada ==
- Boulder Dam Hotel
- CasaBlanca Resort
- Terrible's Hotel & Casino
- Goldfield Hotel
- Hard Rock Hotel and Casino
- Harrah's Lake Tahoe
- Harveys Lake Tahoe
- Hoover Dam Lodge
- Little A'Le'Inn
- Longstreet Hotel, Casino, and RV Resort
- Mesquite Star Hotel and Casino
- Mizpah Hotel
- MontBleu
- Ormsby House
- Stagecoach Hotel & Casino

=== Las Vegas ===
- Aladdin Hotel & Casino
- Aliante Casino and Hotel
- Aria Resort & Casino
- Arizona Charlie's Boulder
- Arizona Charlie's Decatur
- Bally's Las Vegas
- Bellagio (hotel and casino)
- Binion's Gambling Hall and Hotel
- Binion's Horseshoe
- Boardwalk Hotel and Casino
- Boulder Station
- Bourbon Street Hotel and Casino
- Caesars Palace
- California Hotel and Casino
- Cannery Casino and Hotel
- Casino Royale Hotel & Casino
- Castaways hotel and casino
- Circa Resort & Casino
- Circus Circus Las Vegas
- Clarion Hotel and Casino
- Continental Hotel and Casino
- Cosmopolitan of Las Vegas
- The Cromwell Las Vegas
- The D Las Vegas (formerly Fitzgeralds Las Vegas)
- Delano Las Vegas
- Desert Inn
- The Drew Las Vegas
- Dunes (hotel and casino)
- Eastside Cannery Hotel and Casino
- El Cortez
- El Rancho Casino
- El Rancho Vegas
- Encore Las Vegas
- Excalibur Hotel and Casino
- Flamingo Las Vegas
- Four Queens
- Fremont Hotel and Casino
- Gold Coast Hotel and Casino
- Gold Spike Hotel and Casino
- Golden Gate Hotel and Casino
- Golden Nugget Las Vegas
- Green Valley Ranch resort and spa
- Hacienda
- Hard Rock Hotel and Casino (Virgin Hotels Las Vegas in 2020)
- Harrah's Las Vegas
- Hotel San Remo
- JW Marriott Las Vegas Resort and Spa
- Klondike Hotel & Casino
- La Concha Motel
- Lady Luck Hotel & Casino
- The Landmark Hotel and Casino
- Las Vegas Club
- Las Vegas Plaza
- The Linq
- Lucky Club Casino and Hotel
- Luxor Las Vegas
- M Resort
- Main Street Station Hotel and Casino and Brewery
- Mandalay Bay Resort and Casino
- Mandarin Oriental, Las Vegas
- Marina Hotel
- MGM Grand Las Vegas
- The Mint Las Vegas
- The Mirage
- Moulin Rouge Hotel
- New Frontier Hotel and Casino
- New York-New York Hotel & Casino
- The Orleans Hotel and Casino
- Oyo Hotel & Casino (formerly Hooters Casino Hotel)
- Palace Station
- The Palazzo
- Palms Casino Resort
- Paris Las Vegas
- Park MGM
- Planet Hollywood Resort and Casino
- Plaza Hotel & Casino
- Railroad Pass Casino
- Red Rock Casino, Resort & Spa
- The Resort at Summerlin
- Resorts World Las Vegas
- Rio All Suite Hotel and Casino
- Riviera
- Sam's Town Hotel and Gambling Hall, Las Vegas
- Sands Hotel
- Santa Fe Station
- The Signature at MGM Grand
- Silver Sevens
- Silver Slipper
- Silverbird Hotel
- Silverton Las Vegas (formerly Boomtown Las Vegas)
- Sahara Las Vegas (formerly SLS Las Vegas)
- South Point Hotel, Casino & Spa
- The Strat Hotel, Casino & Skypod (formerly Stratosphere)
- Suncoast Hotel and Casino
- Sunset Station
- Texas Station
- Thunderbird
- Treasure Island Hotel and Casino
- Tropicana Las Vegas
- Trump Hotel Las Vegas
- Tuscany Suites and Casino
- Vdara
- Veer Towers
- Vegas World
- The Venetian, Las Vegas
- The Western
- Westgate Las Vegas
- Westin Casuarina Las Vegas Hotel, Casino & Spa
- Westward Ho Hotel and Casino
- Wild Wild West Gambling Hall & Hotel
- Wynn Las Vegas

=== Primm ===
- Buffalo Bill's
- Primm Valley Resort
- Whiskey Pete's

=== Reno-Sparks ===
- Atlantis Casino Resort
- Boomtown Reno
- Circus Circus Reno
- Club Cal Neva
- Eldorado Reno
- Grand Sierra Resort
- Harrah's Reno
- Nugget Casino Resort
- Peppermill Reno
- Riverside Hotel
- Sands Regency
- Siena Reno
- Silver Legacy Reno
- Whitney Peak Hotel (formerly known as Fitzgeralds Reno and CommRow)

== New Hampshire ==
- The Balsams Grand Resort Hotel
- Eastern Slope Inn
- The Exeter Inn
- Mount Washington Hotel
- Mountain View House
- Rockingham Hotel
- Tip-Top House
- Wentworth by the Sea
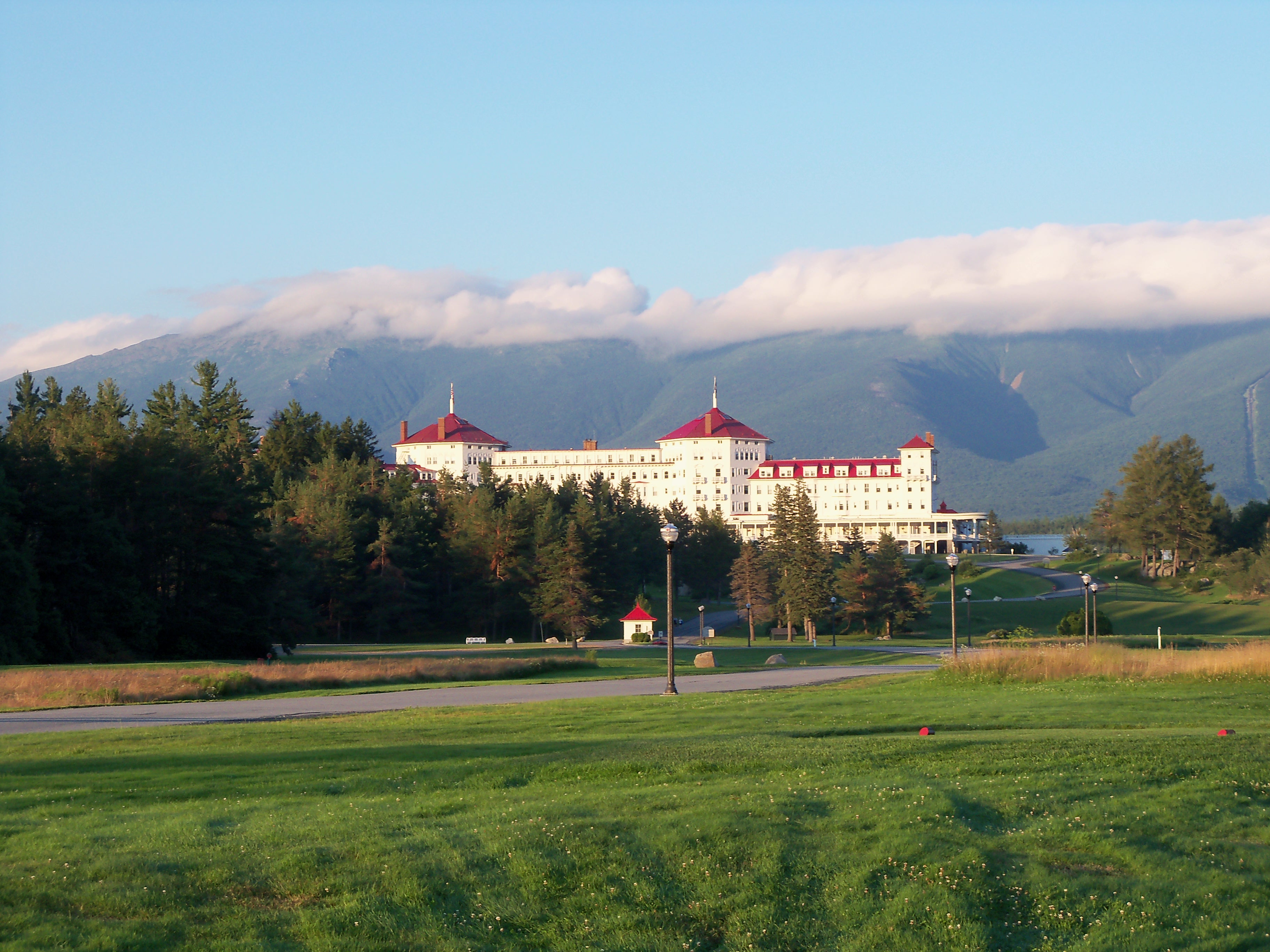
Mount Washington Hotel

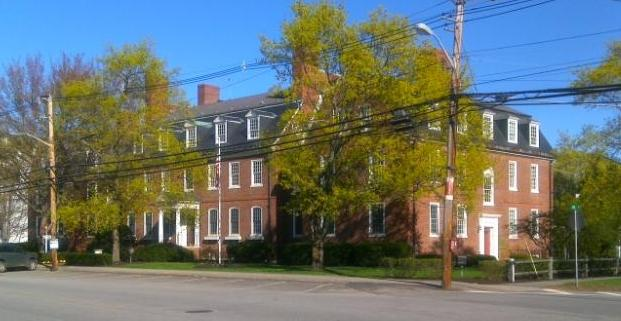
The Exeter Inn

== New Jersey ==
- ACH Casino Resort
- Bally's Atlantic City
- The Borgata
- Caesars Atlantic City
- Camp Whelen
- Caribbean Motel
- Claridge Atlantic City
- Congress Hall (Cape May hotel)
- The Empress Hotel
- Engleside Hotel
- Forrestal Village
- Golden Nugget Atlantic City
- Golden Nugget Atlantic City (1980-1987)
- Hard Rock Hotel and Casino Atlantic City
- Harrah's Atlantic City
- Harvey Cedars Hotel
- Legends Resort & Country Club
- Madison Hotel (Atlantic City)
- Marlborough-Blenheim Hotel
- Metropolitan Hotel (Asbury Park)
- Molly Pitcher Inn
- Nassau Inn
- Penthouse Boardwalk Hotel and Casino
- Pinnacle Atlantic City
- Red Maple Farm
- Resorts Casino Hotel
- Rickshaw Inn
- Ritz-Carlton Atlantic City
- Robert Treat Center
- Sands Atlantic City
- Seaview (Absecon)
- Shelburne Hotel
- Showboat Atlantic City
- Traymore Hotel
- Tropicana Casino & Resort Atlantic City
- Trump Plaza Hotel and Casino
- Trump Taj Mahal
- Trump World's Fair
- Union Hotel
- The Water Club
- The Wild Wild West Casino

== New Mexico ==
- Andaluz Hotel
- Aztec Auto Court
- El Navajo Hotel
- El Rancho Hotel & Motel
- Hotel Clovis
- Hyatt Regency Albuquerque
- Montezuma Castle (hotel)
- St. James Hotel
- Taos Inn

== New York ==
=== Long Island ===
- Garden City Hotel
- Granada Towers
- Gurney's Inn
- Halliock Inn
- Montauk Manor
- Octagon Hotel
- Roslyn House
- Terry-Ketcham Inn

=== New York City ===
==== Bronx ====
- Concourse Plaza Hotel
- Opera House Hotel

==== Brooklyn ====
- Elephantine Colossus
- Half Moon Hotel
- Hotel Bossert
- Hotel St. George

==== Manhattan ====
- 1717 Broadway
- 6 Times Square
- Affinia Hotels
- Algonquin Hotel
- Allerton Hotel for Women
- Barbizon 63
- The Benjamin Royal Sonesta New York
- Braddock Hotel
- Bradford Hotel
- Carlyle Hotel
- Cassa Hotel & Residences
- The Chatwal New York
- Cooper Square Hotel
- Crowne Plaza Times Square Manhattan
- DoubleTree by Hilton Hotel Metropolitan New York City
- Fifth Avenue Hotel
- Four Seasons Hotel New York
- The GEM Hotel
- Gilsey Hotel
- Gilsey House
- Gramercy Park Hotel
- Grand Hotel
- Hotel Belleclaire
- Hotel Carter
- Hotel Chelsea
- Hotel Elysee
- Hotel Gansevoort
- Hotel Gerard
- Hotel Giraffe
- Hotel Lafayette
- Hotel Pennsylvania
- Hotel Roger Williams
- Hotel Theresa
- Hotel Wolcott
- Hudson Hotel
- Hyatt Grand Central New York
- InterContinental New York Barclay Hotel
- James New York – NoMad
- The Jane
- JW Marriott Essex House
- Lexington Hotel
- Library Hotel
- Lombardy Hotel
- Lotte New York Palace Hotel
- Mandarin Oriental, New York
- Maritime Hotel
- Martha Washington Hotel
- Martinique New York on Broadway, Curio Collection by Hilton
- McGown's Pass Tavern
- The Michelangelo
- Milford Plaza Hotel
- Millenium Hilton Hotel
- Millennium Times Square New York
- Millennium UN Plaza
- Morgans Hotel
- Mount Vernon Hotel Museum
- The New York Helmsley Hotel
- New York Hilton Midtown
- New York Marriott East Side
- New York Marriott Marquis
- New Yorker Hotel
- Olcott Hotel
- Paramount Hotel
- Park Central Hotel
- The Peninsula New York
- The Pierre
- Plaza Hotel
- The Redbury New York
- The Ritz-Carlton New York (historically the Hotel St. Moritz)
- The Roosevelt Hotel
- Row NYC Hotel
- Royalton Hotel
- St. Regis New York
- Sheraton New York Hotel and Towers
- Sherry Netherland Hotel
- Sofitel New York Hotel
- Soldiers', Sailors', Marines', Coast Guard and Airmen's Club
- St. Nicholas Hotel
- Standard Hotel
- Sunshine Hotel
- Times Square Hotel
- Trump International Hotel and Tower
- Trump SoHo
- W New York Downtown Hotel and Residences
- W New York Union Square
- Waldorf-Astoria Hotel
- Warwick New York Hotel
- Webster Hotel

==== Queens ====
- Curley's Atlas Hotel and Baths
- Marine Pavilion
- Ramada Plaza JFK Hotel
- Rockaway Beach Hotel
- TWA Hotel

=== Upstate New York ===
- Adams-Ryan House
- Adirondack Hotel
- Adirondak Loj
- Adler Hotel
- American Hotel
- Arlington Hotel
- Arthur Tavern
- Aurora Inn
- Avon Inn
- Bagg's Hotel
- Bateman Hotel
- Bear Mountain Inn
- Beaverkill Valley Inn
- Belmont Hotel
- Blue Mountain House Annex
- Brick Tavern Stand
- Brookside Museum
- C. Burton Hotel
- Caledonia House Hotel
- Cannon Building
- Catskill Mountain House
- Chase Mills Inn
- Clark-Dearstyne-Miller Inn
- Clifton Park Hotel
- Clinton House
- Cobblestone Inn
- Concord Resort Hotel
- Cromwell Manor
- Delaney Hotel
- Drovers Inn and Round Family Residence
- Elston Hall
- Foster Building
- Frontier House
- Fuller's Tavern
- Gallupville House
- Glen Iris Inn
- Grossinger's Catskill Resort Hotel
- Hotel Broadalbin
- Hotel Champlain
- The Hotel Clarence
- Hotel Delaware
- Hotel Lafayette
- Hotel Syracuse
- Hotel Utica
- Jacob Crouse Inn
- John Van Buren Tavern
- Kirkland Hotel
- Kutsher's Hotel
- Larzelere Tavern
- LeRay Hotel
- Lexington House
- Lynch Hotel
- Major's Inn and Gilbert Block
- Marlborough Building
- Mohonk Mountain House
- National Hotel
- Nevele Grand Hotel
- The Niagara
- Paul Smith's Hotel
- Phoenix Building
- Pontiac Hotel
- Rhinecliff Hotel
- Rogues' Harbor Inn
- The Sagamore
- Sans Souci Hotel
- Seneca Niagara Casino & Hotel
- Silver Bay Association Complex
- Spring House, Barryville
- Spring House, Pittsford
- Standard House
- Stoops Hotel
- Thayer Hotel
- Turning Stone Resort & Casino
- Ulster House Hotel
- Union Hotel
- W. F. DeWitt Hotel
- Weldon House
- Wiawaka Holiday House

=== Westchester County ===
- Elephant Hotel
- Westchester Country Club

== North Carolina ==
- Battery Park Hotel
- Brookwood Inn
- Carolina Inn
- Fearrington Village
- Green Park Inn
- Grove Park Inn
- Haughton-McIver House
- Highlands Inn
- Hotel Charlotte
- Nu-Wray Inn
- Page-Walker Hotel
- Sir Walter Raleigh Hotel
- Soleil Center
- Westin Charlotte

== North Dakota ==
- Cole Hotel
- Patterson Hotel
- Powers Hotel
- Waldorf Hotel
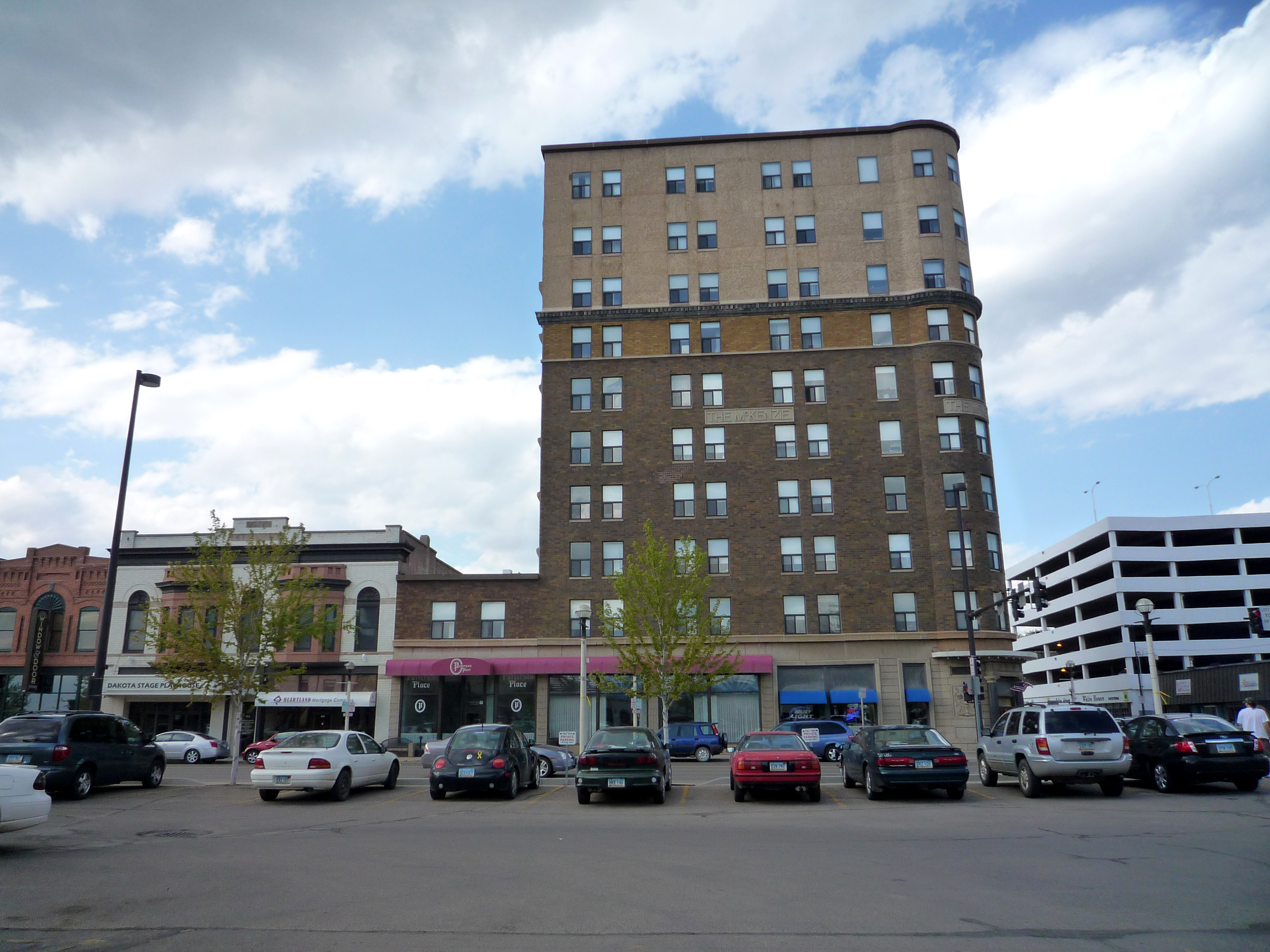
Patterson Hotel

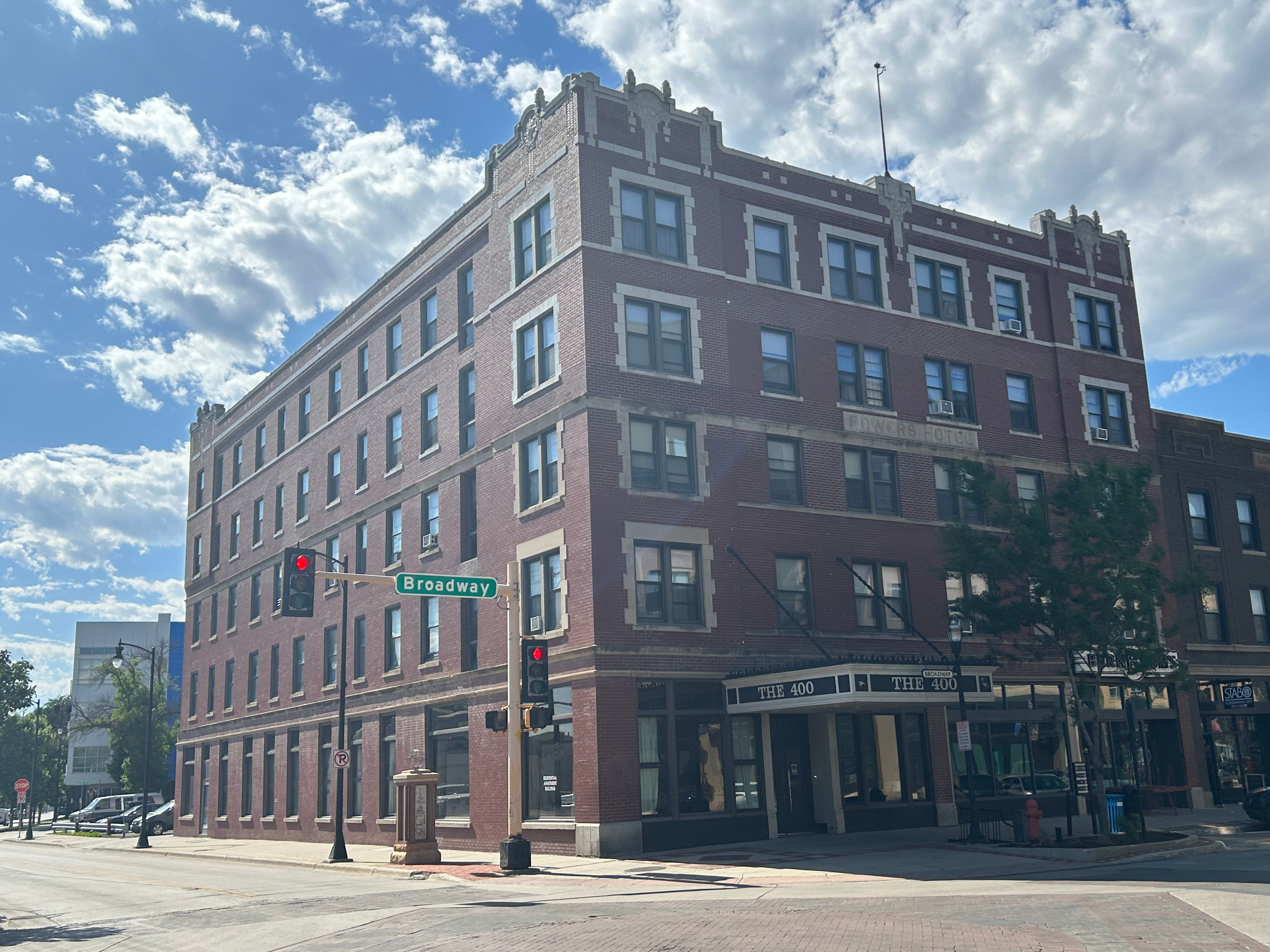
Powers Hotel

== Ohio ==
- Alcazar Hotel
- Antlers Hotel
- Arcade Hotel
- Arlington Hotel
- Barr Hotel
- Berwick Hotel
- Biltmore Hotel
- Brick Tavern House
- Carew Tower
- Fountain Hotel
- Golden Lamb Inn
- Governor's Inn
- Hillcrest Hotel
- Hotel Argonne
- Hotel Breakers
- Hotel Courtland
- Howe Tavern
- Marcus Curtiss Inn
- Marsh Hotel
- Pennsylvania House
- Quaker Square
- The Seneca Hotel
- Shelby House

=== Cincinnati ===
- Cincinnatian Hotel
- Gibson House
- Netherland Plaza Hotel
- Palace Hotel

=== Cleveland ===
- Cleveland Arcade
- Guardian Bank Building
- Hollenden Hotel
- Marriott at Key Center
- Reserve Square
- Tower City Center

== Oklahoma ==
- Buffington Hotel
- Price Tower
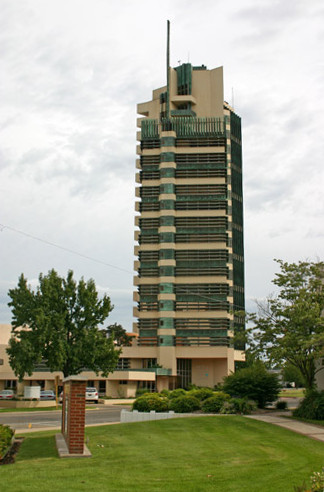
Price Tower

=== Oklahoma City ===
- Colcord Hotel
- Skirvin Hilton Hotel
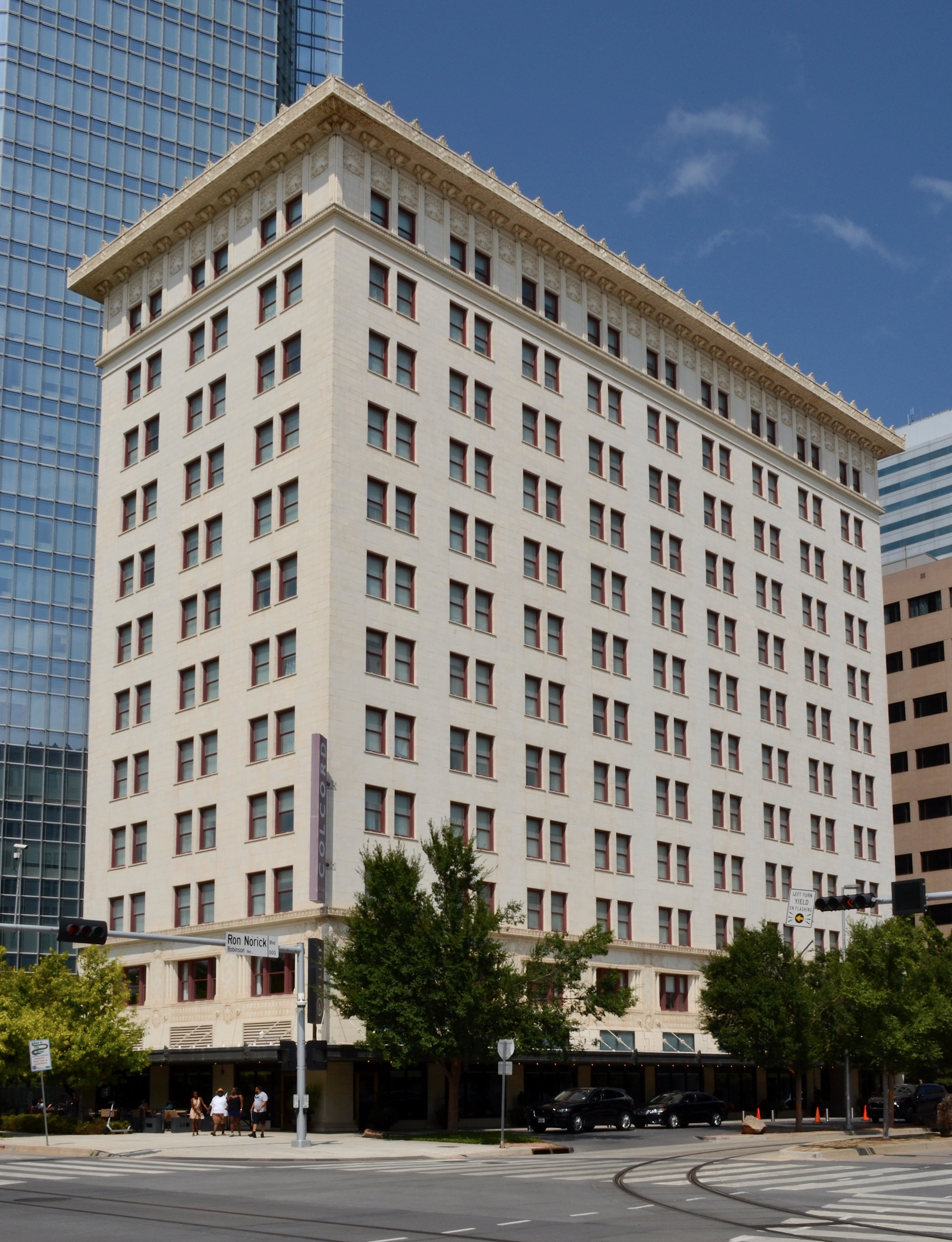
Colcord Hotel

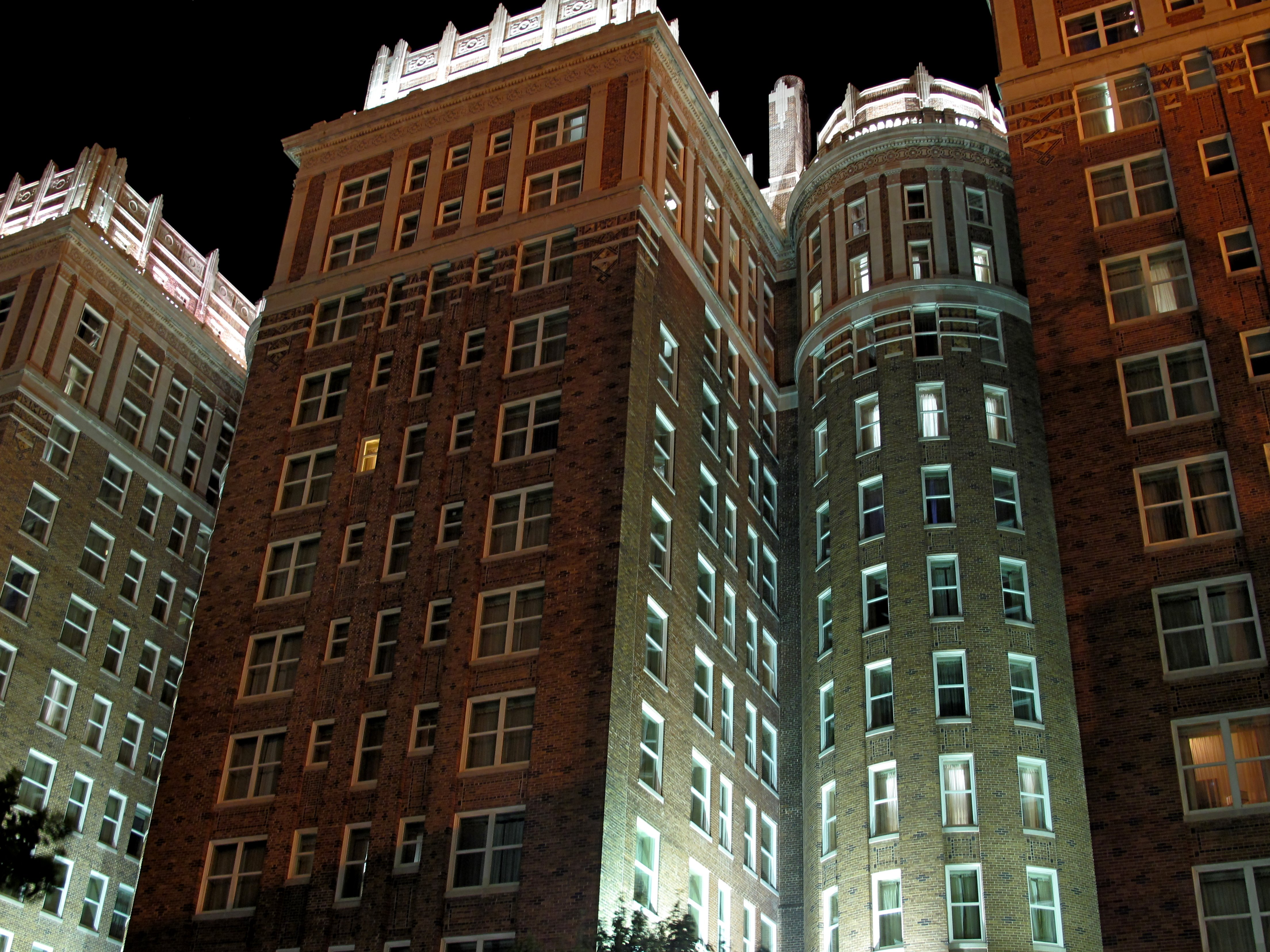
Skirvin Hilton Hotel

=== Tulsa ===
- Ambassador Hotel
- Atlas Life Building
- Mayo Hotel
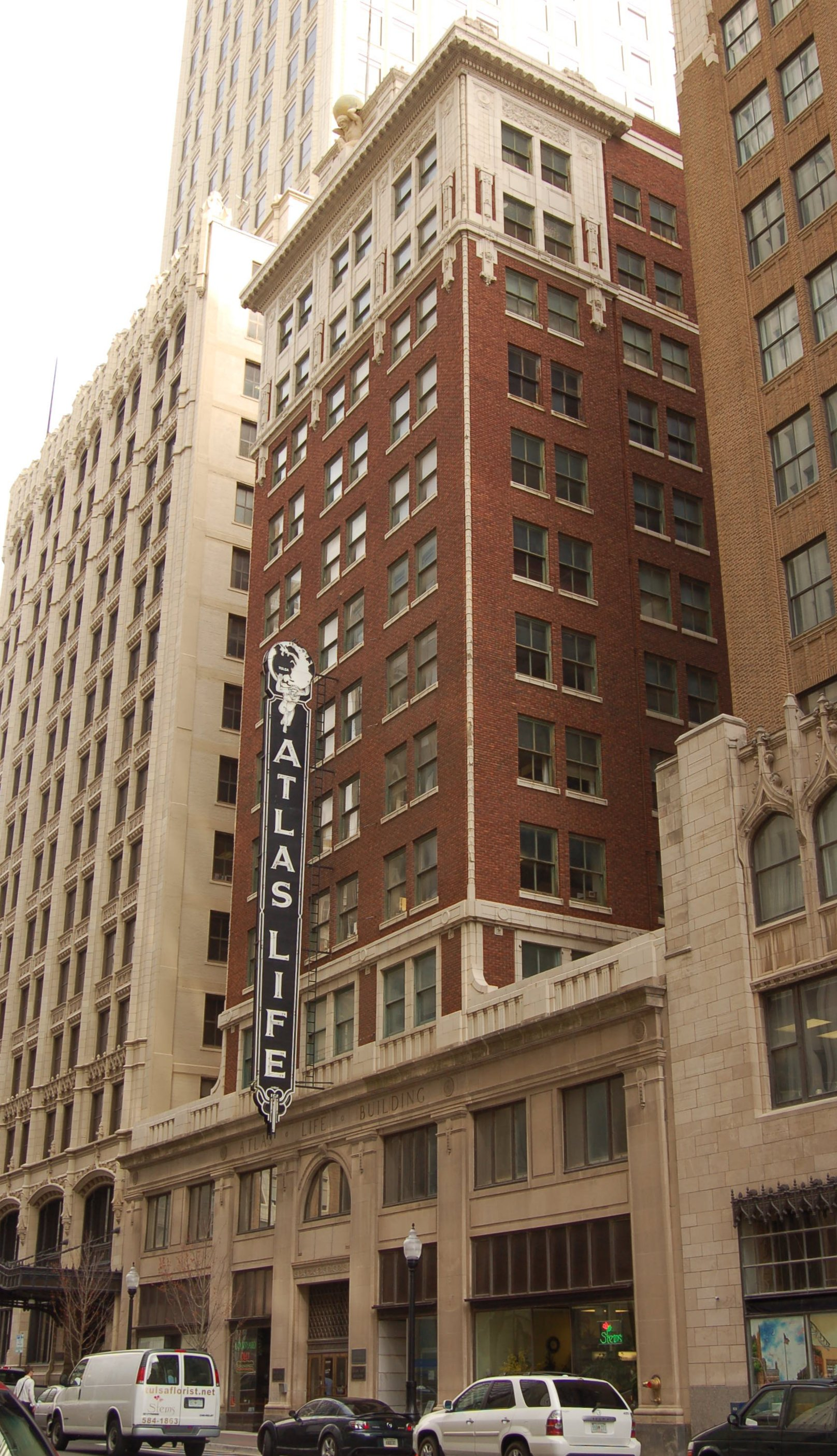
Atlas Life Building

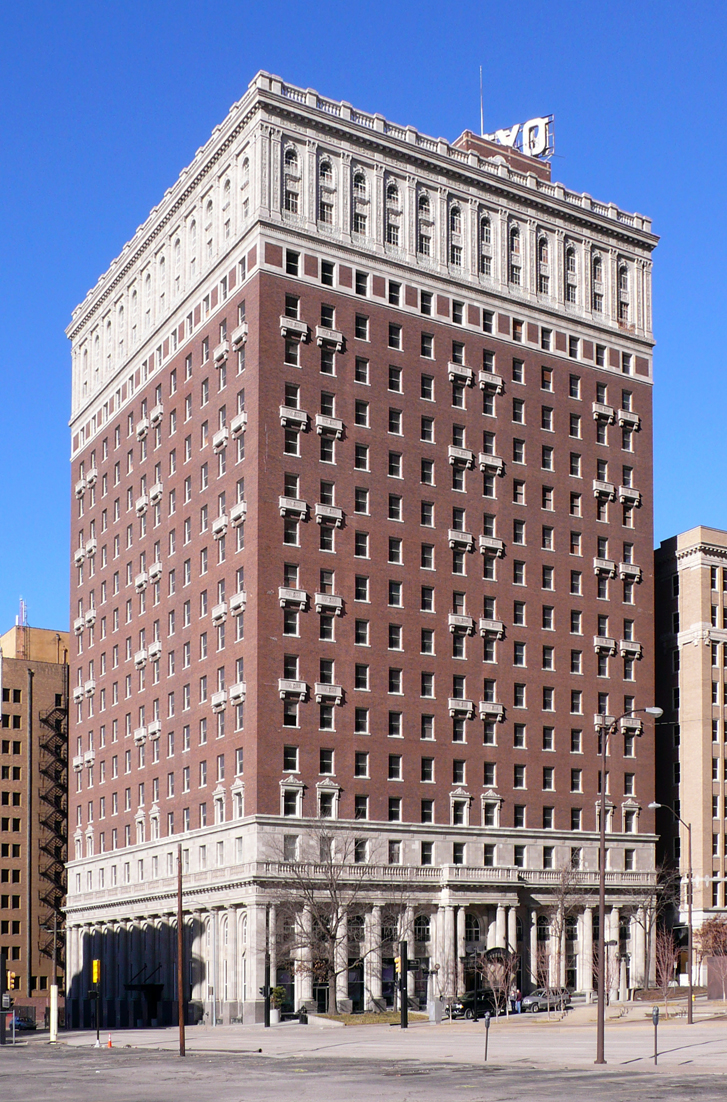
Mayo Hotel

== Oregon ==
- Arlington Hotel
- Ashland Springs Hotel
- Balch Hotel
- Barnum Hotel
- Bowman Hotel
- Columbia Gorge Hotel
- Corvallis Hotel
- Crater Lake Lodge
- Eagle Crest Resort
- Eugene Hotel
- Frenchglen Hotel State Heritage Site
- Geiser Grand Hotel
- Hot Lake Hotel
- Hotel Benton
- John Jacob Astor Hotel
- Julian Hotel
- Lane Hotel
- Multnomah County Poor Farm
- New Taggart Hotel
- Oregon Caves Chateau
- Redwoods Hotel
- Rogue Elk Hotel
- Smeede Hotel
- Sunriver Resort
- Timberline Lodge
- Travelers Home
- View Point Inn
- Winthrow-Melhase Block
- Wolf Creek Inn State Heritage Site

== Pennsylvania ==
- Americus Hotel
- Bedford Springs Resort
- Buchanan Hotel
- Bush House Hotel
- Central Hotel, Mount Joy
- Commercial Hotel
- Copper Beech Manor
- Dimeling Hotel
- Eagle Hotel
- Fulton House
- George F. Schlicher Hotel
- Hotel Allen
- Hotel Edison
- Hotel Hershey
- Hotel Sterling
- Kennedy Mansion
- Lancaster Arts Hotel
- Limestone Inn Bed and Breakfast
- Malden Inn
- Mount Airy Casino Resort
- Mountain Springs Hotel
- New Thomson House
- Penn Alto Building
- Radisson Lackawanna Station Hotel
- Riverside Inn
- Yardley Inn
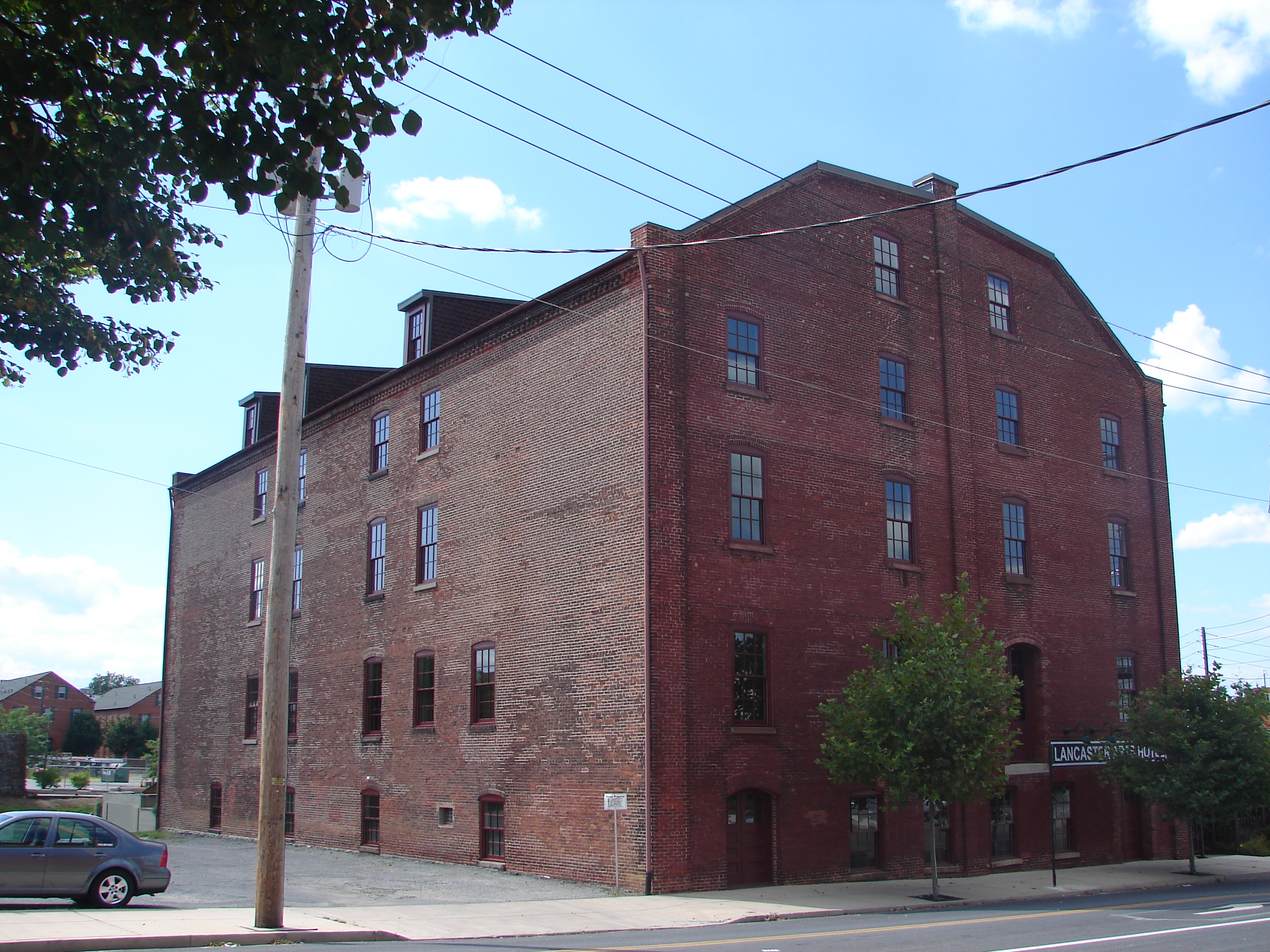
Lancaster Arts Hotel

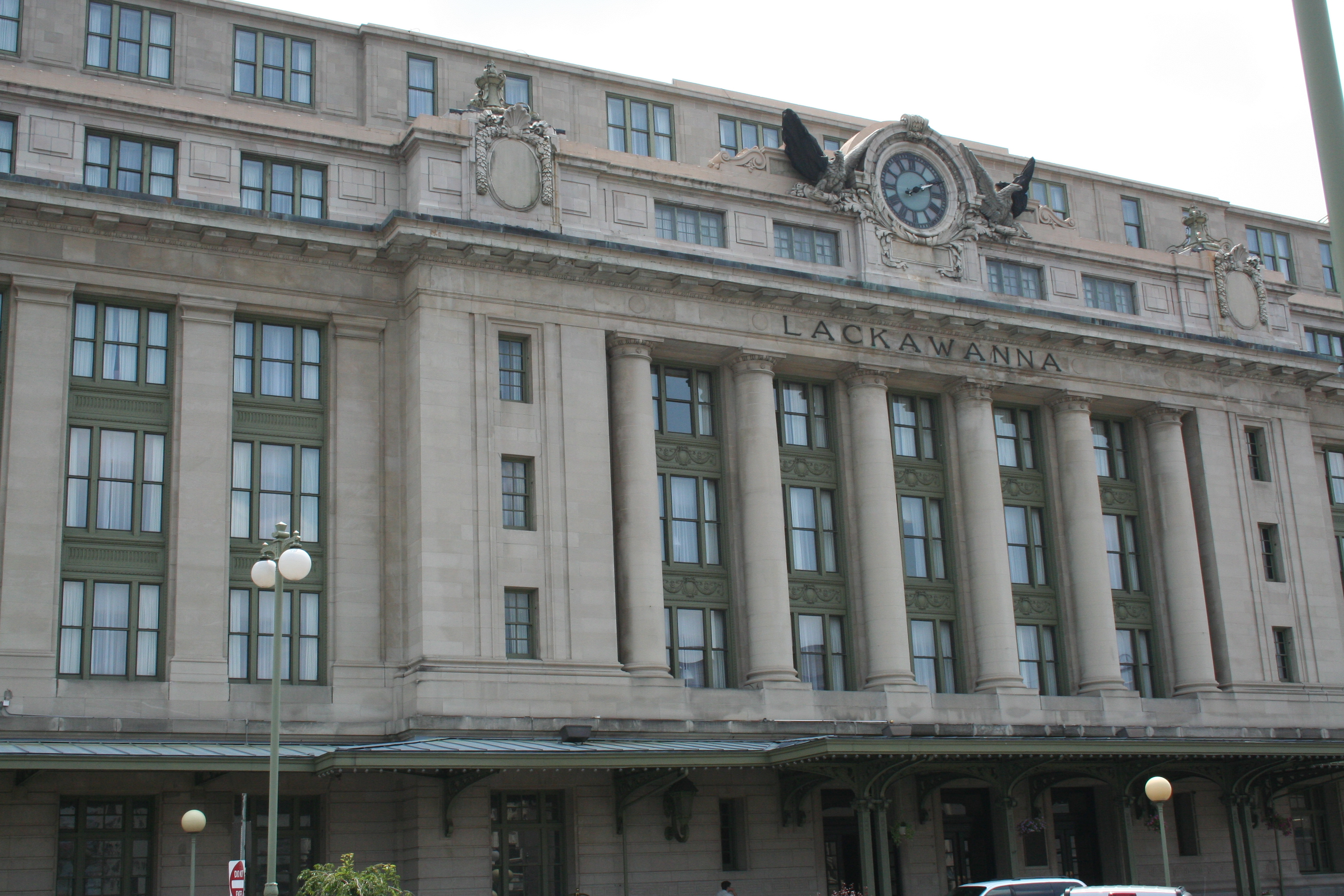
Radisson Lackawanna Station Hotel

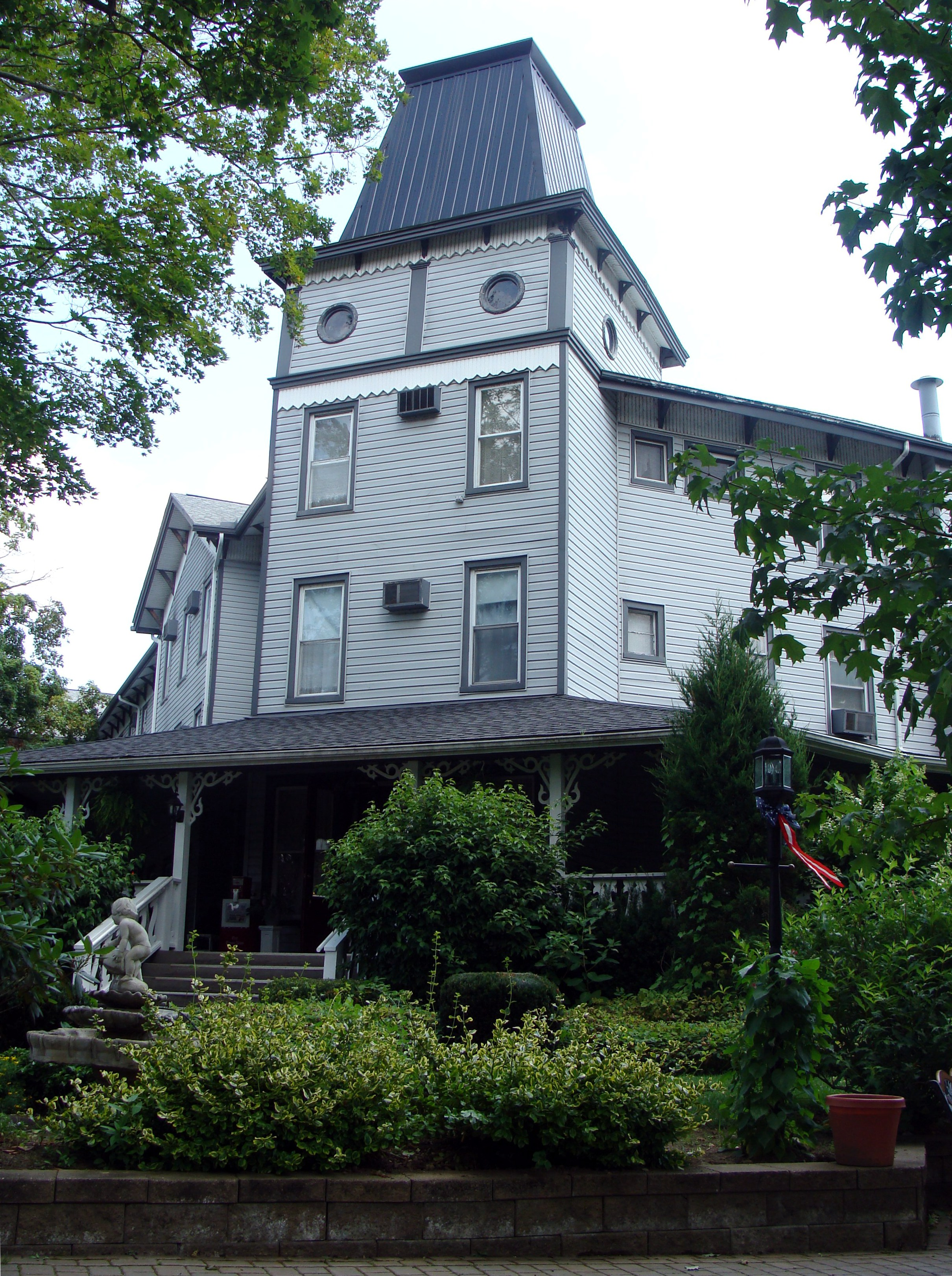
Riverside Inn

=== Philadelphia ===
- The Bellevue-Stratford Hotel
- Drake Hotel
- Liberty Place
- Loews Philadelphia Hotel
- The Warwick
- The W Philadelphia and Element Philadelphia
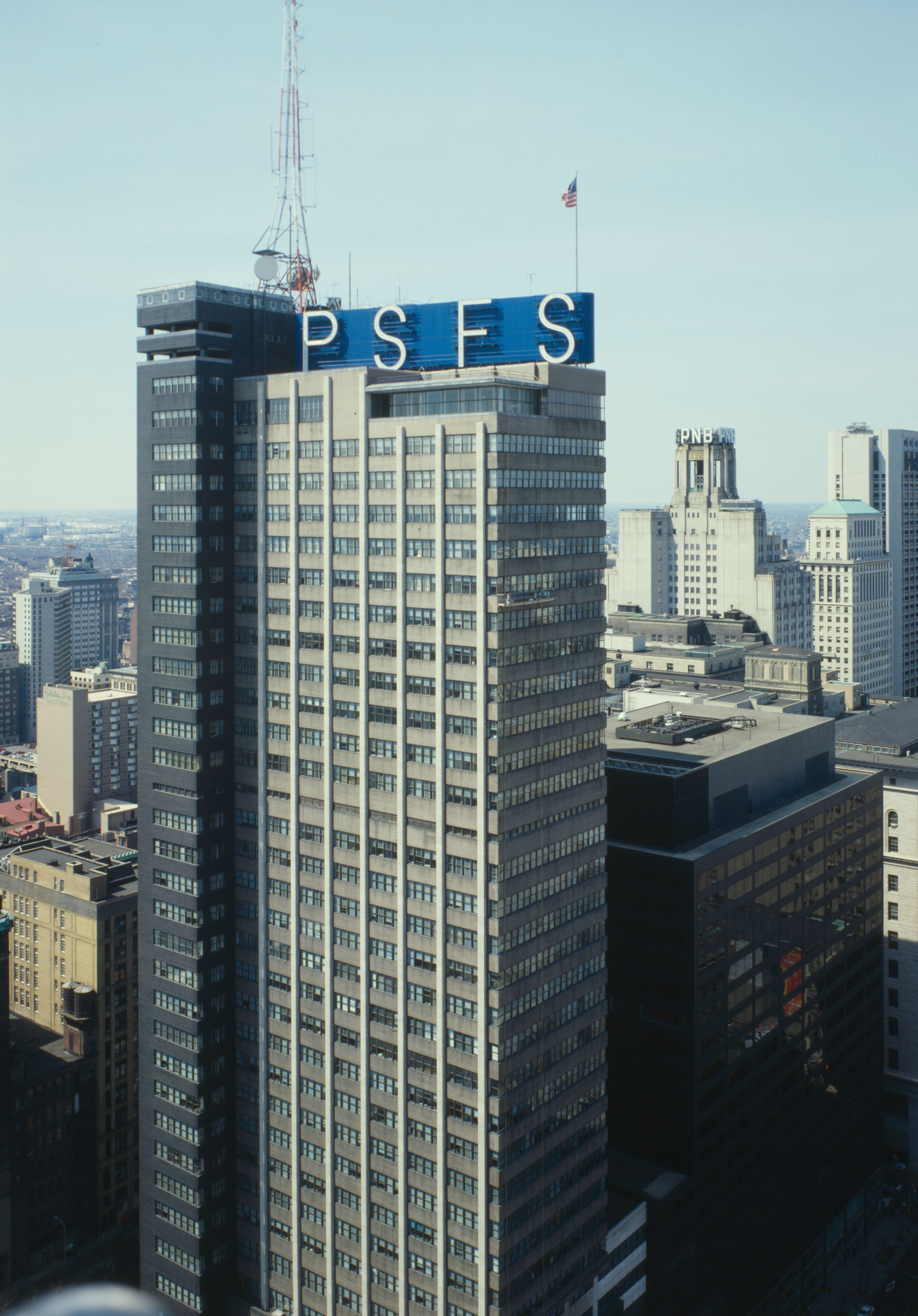
Loews Philadelphia Hotel

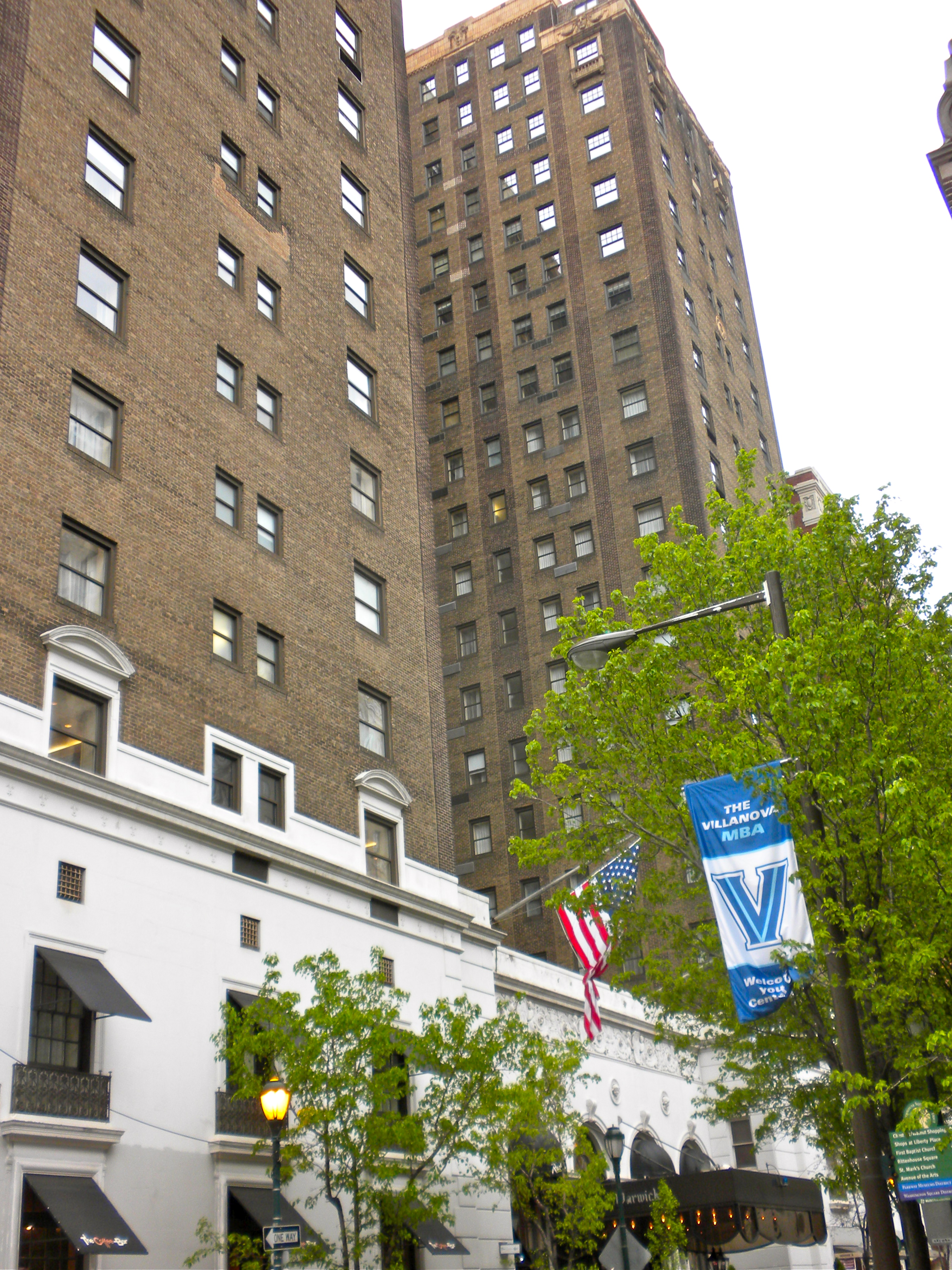
The Warwick

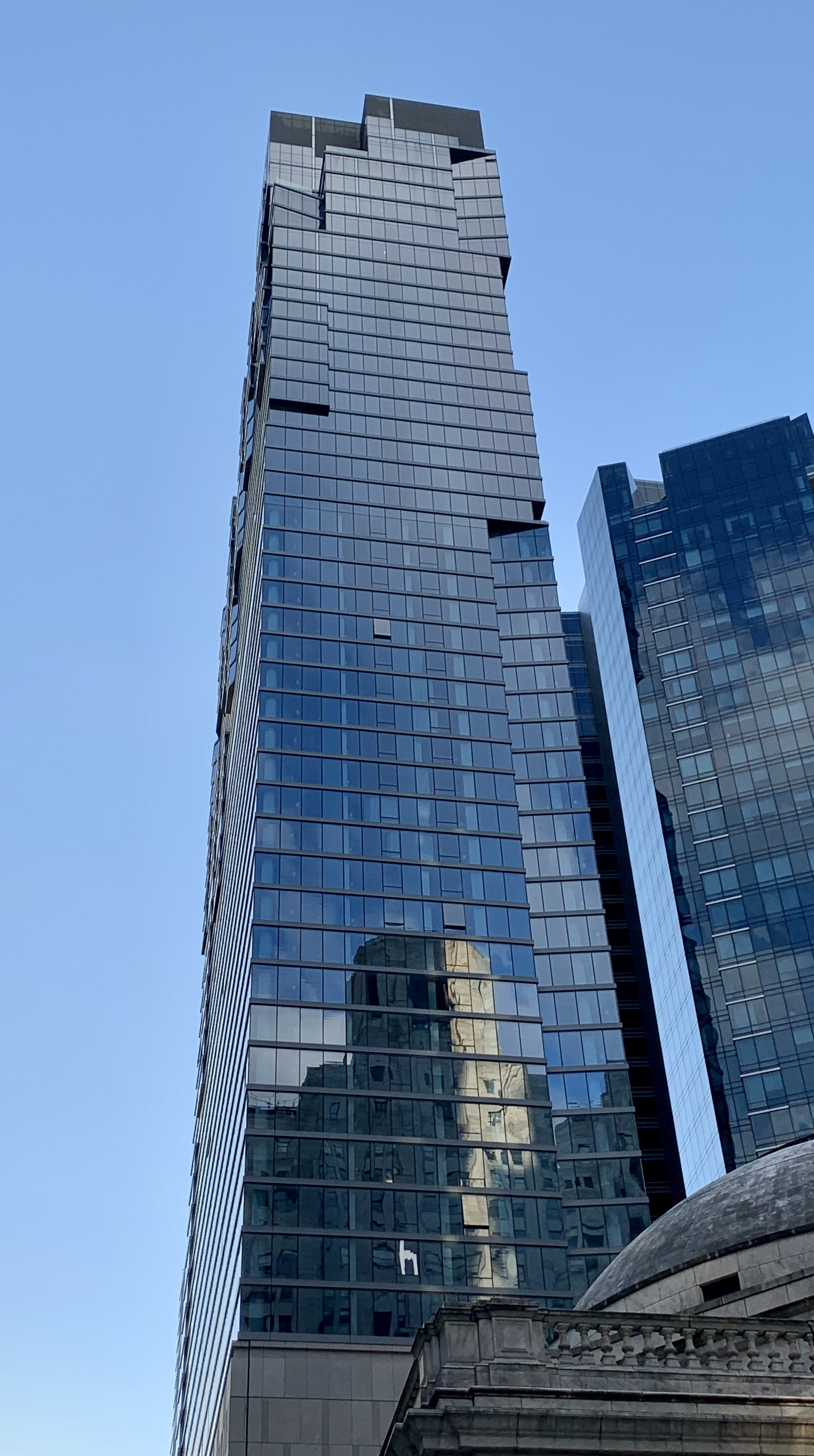
The W Philadelphia and Element Philadelphia

=== Pittsburgh ===
- Columbia Hotel
- Drury Hotel
- Embassy Suites
- Fairmont
- Marriott
- Renaissance Hotel
- Westin Convention Center
- William Penn Hotel
- Wyndham Grand
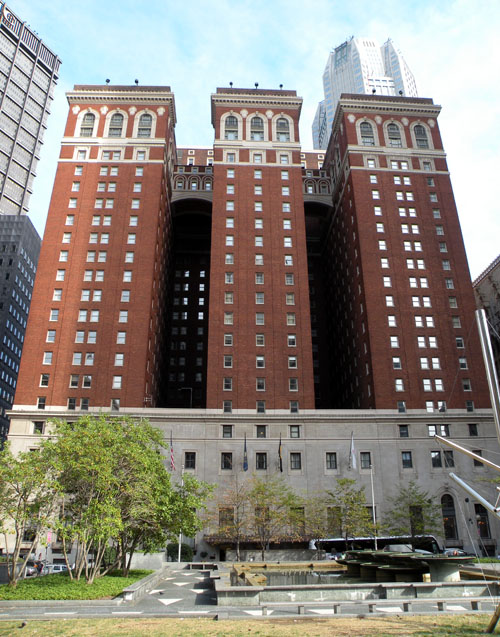
William Penn Hotel

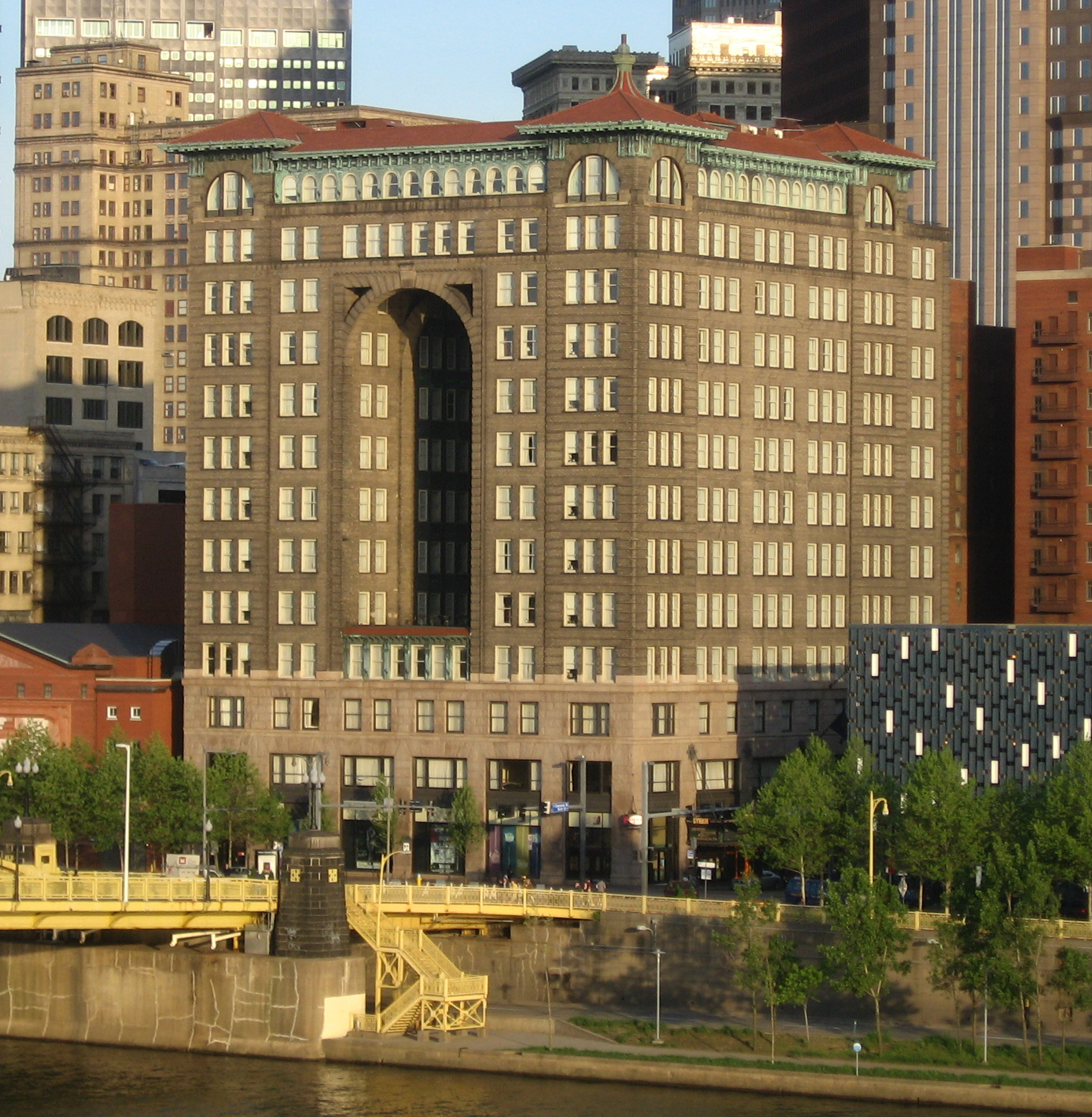
Renaissance Hotel

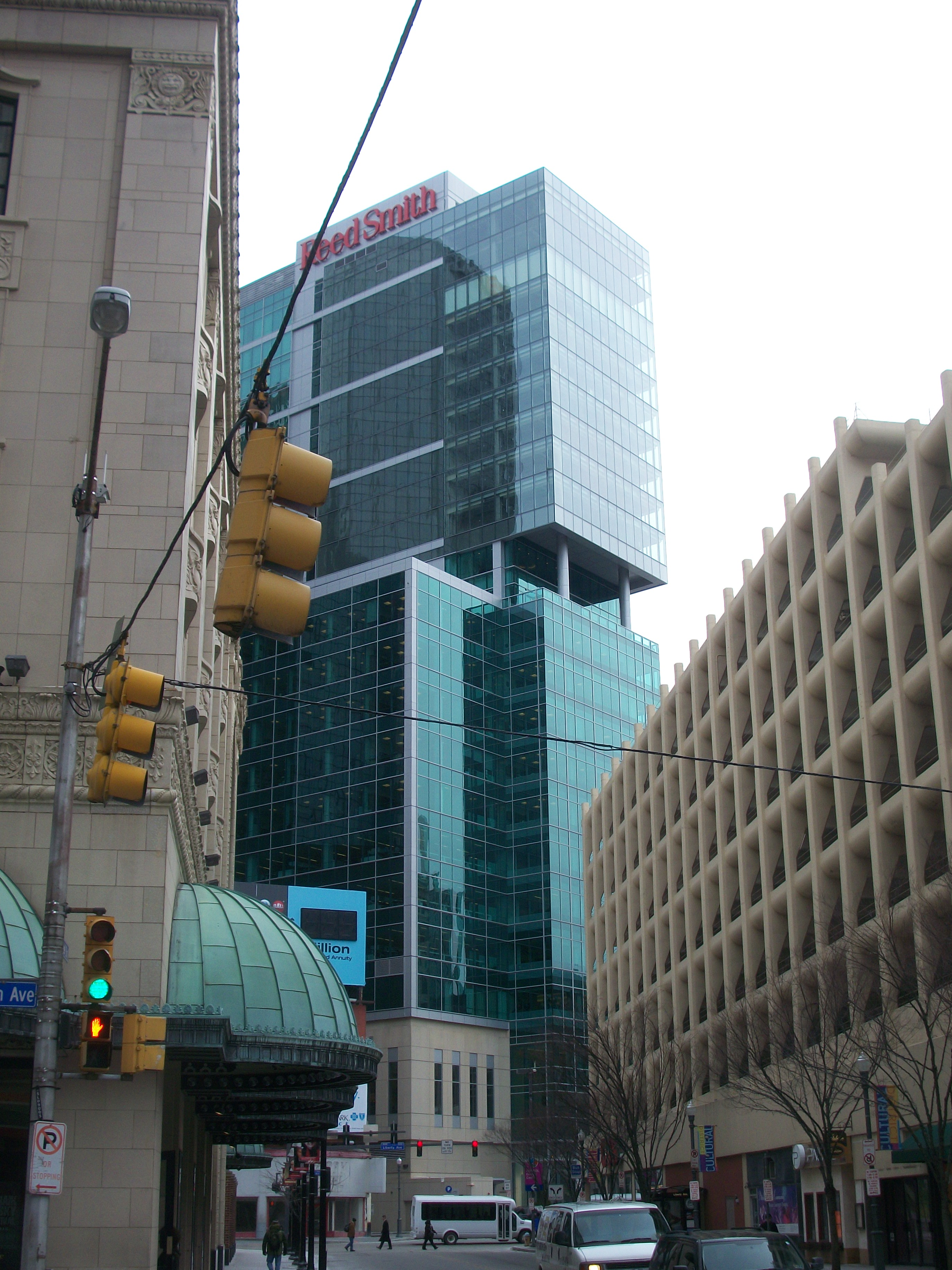
Fairmont

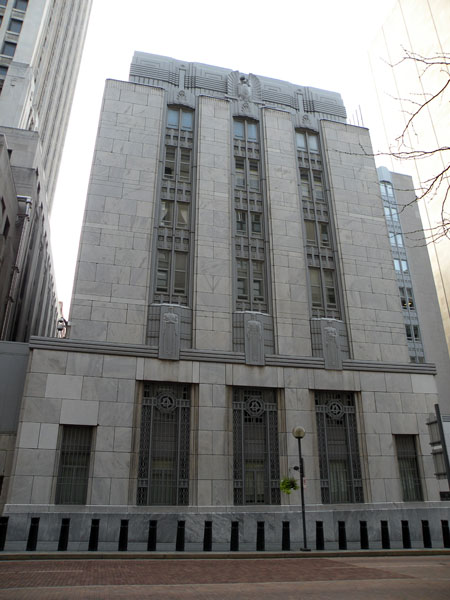
Drury Hotel

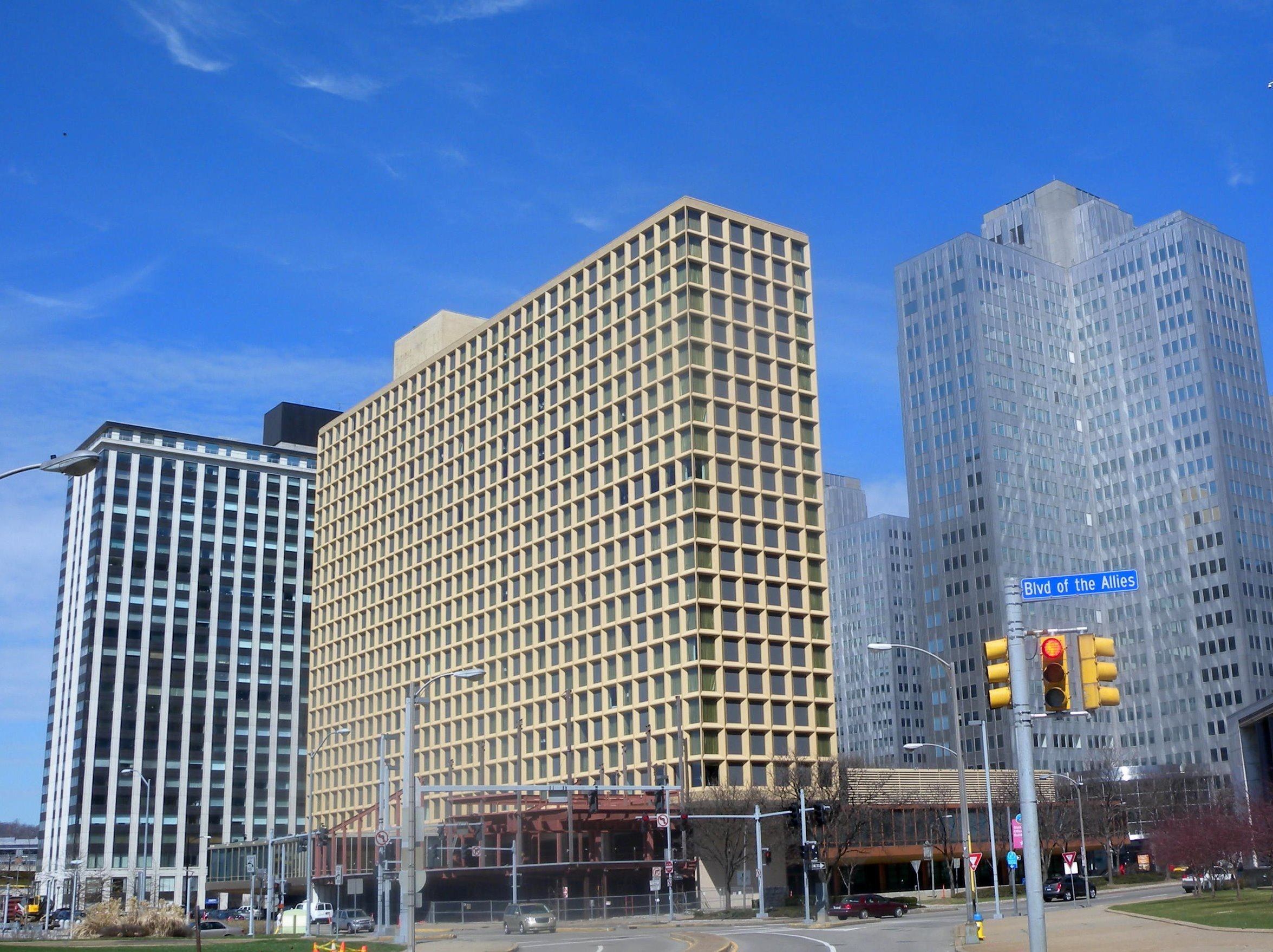
Wyndham Grand

== Rhode Island ==
- Admiral Fitzroy Inn
- Greene Inn
- Newport Beach Hotel & Suites
- Ocean House, Rhode Island
- Omni Providence Hotel
- Providence Biltmore
- Renaissance Providence Hotel
- The Residences Providence
- Weekapaug Inn

== South Carolina ==
- Chesterfield Inn
- Extended Stay Hotels
- Ocean Forest Hotel
- Meeting Street Inn
- Pleasant Inn
- Rainbow Court
- The Willcox

== South Dakota ==
- Brown Palace Hotel
- Bullock Hotel
- Calumet Hotel

== Tennessee ==
- Andrew Johnson Building
- Bijou Theatre
- Chilhowee Inn
- Clement Railroad Hotel Museum
- Courtyard Nashville Downtown
- Donoho Hotel
- Gaylord Opryland Resort & Convention Center
- Hale House-Patterson Hotel
- Hale Springs Inn
- Hermitage Hotel
- Maxwell House Hotel
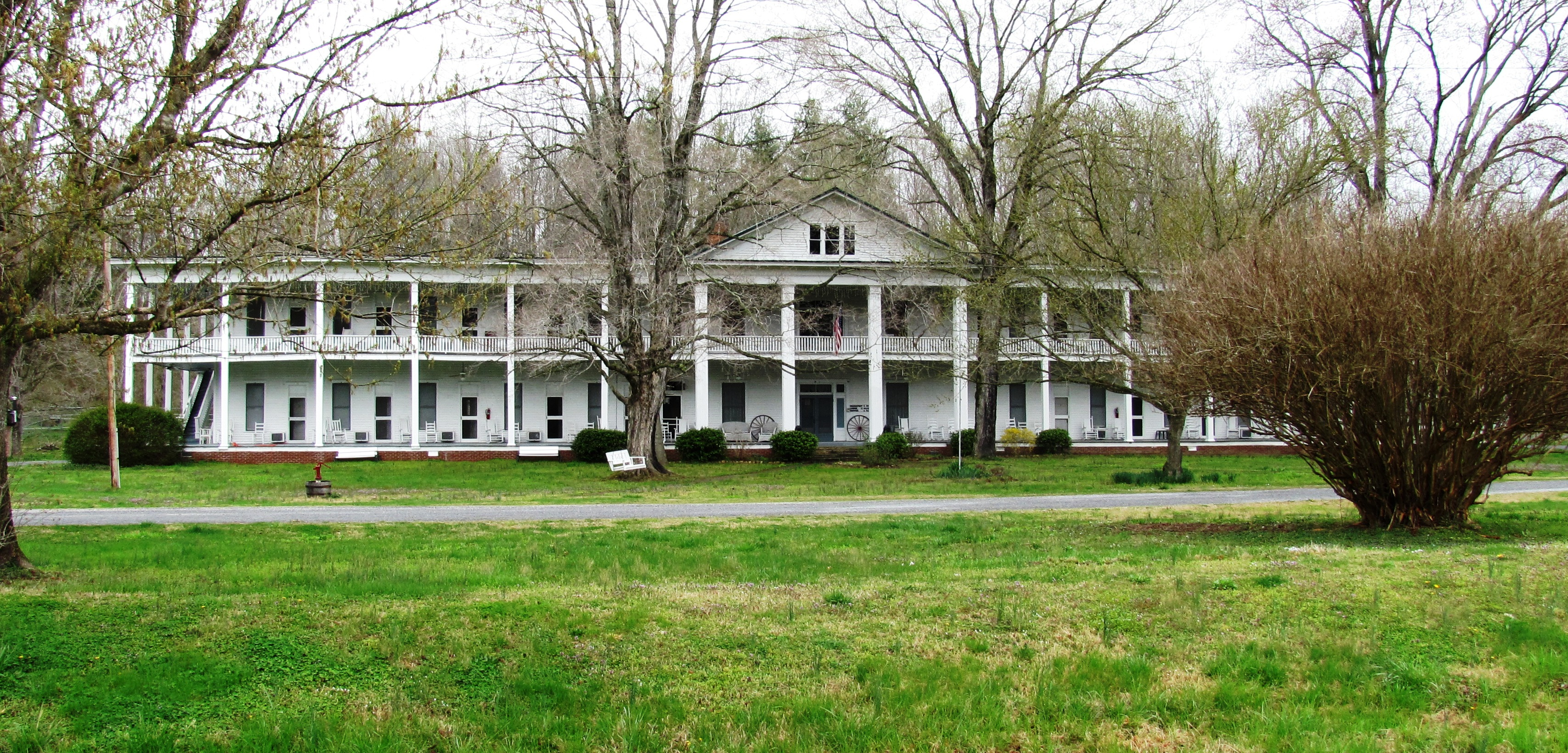
Donoho Hotel

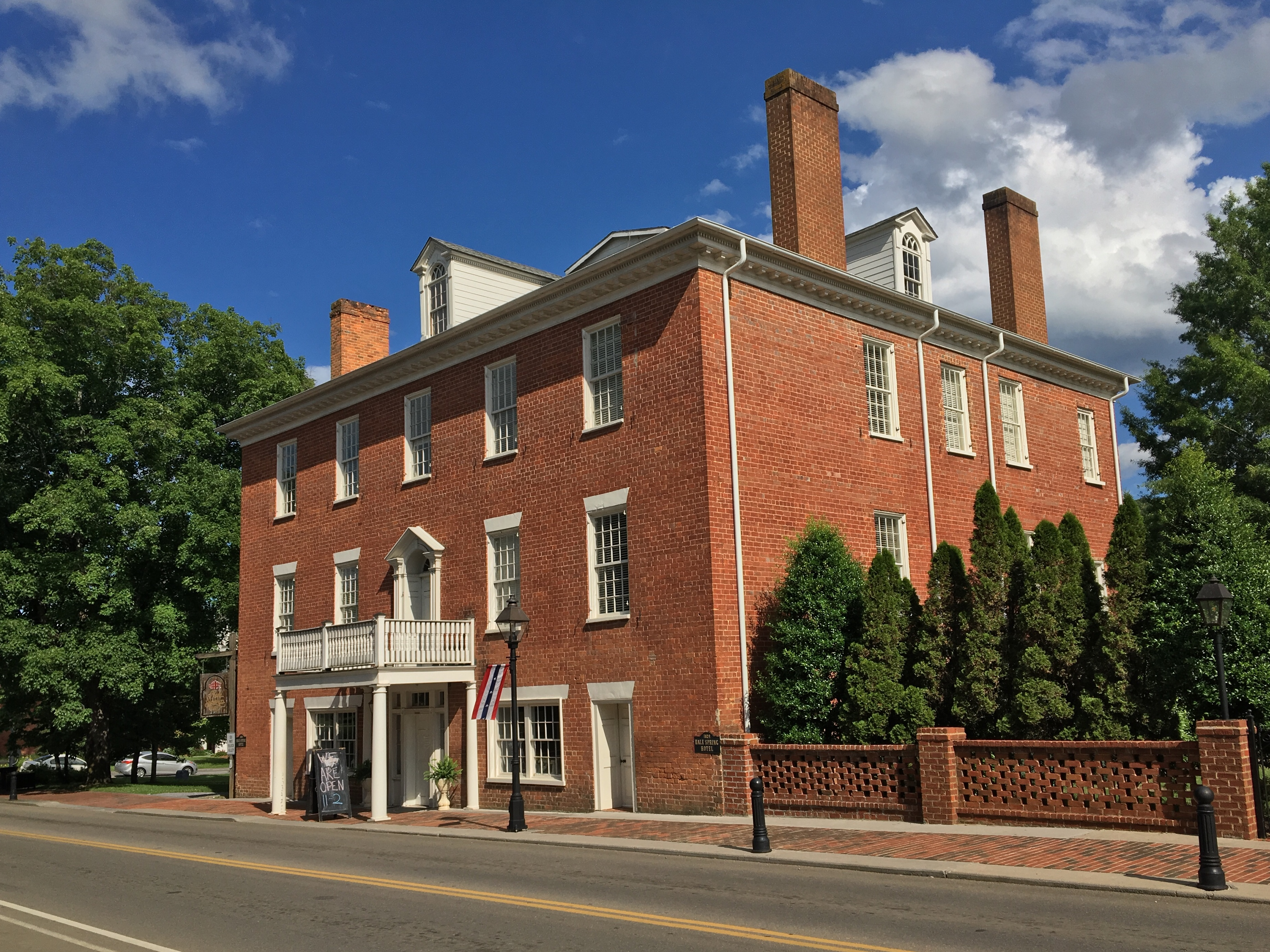
Hale Springs Inn

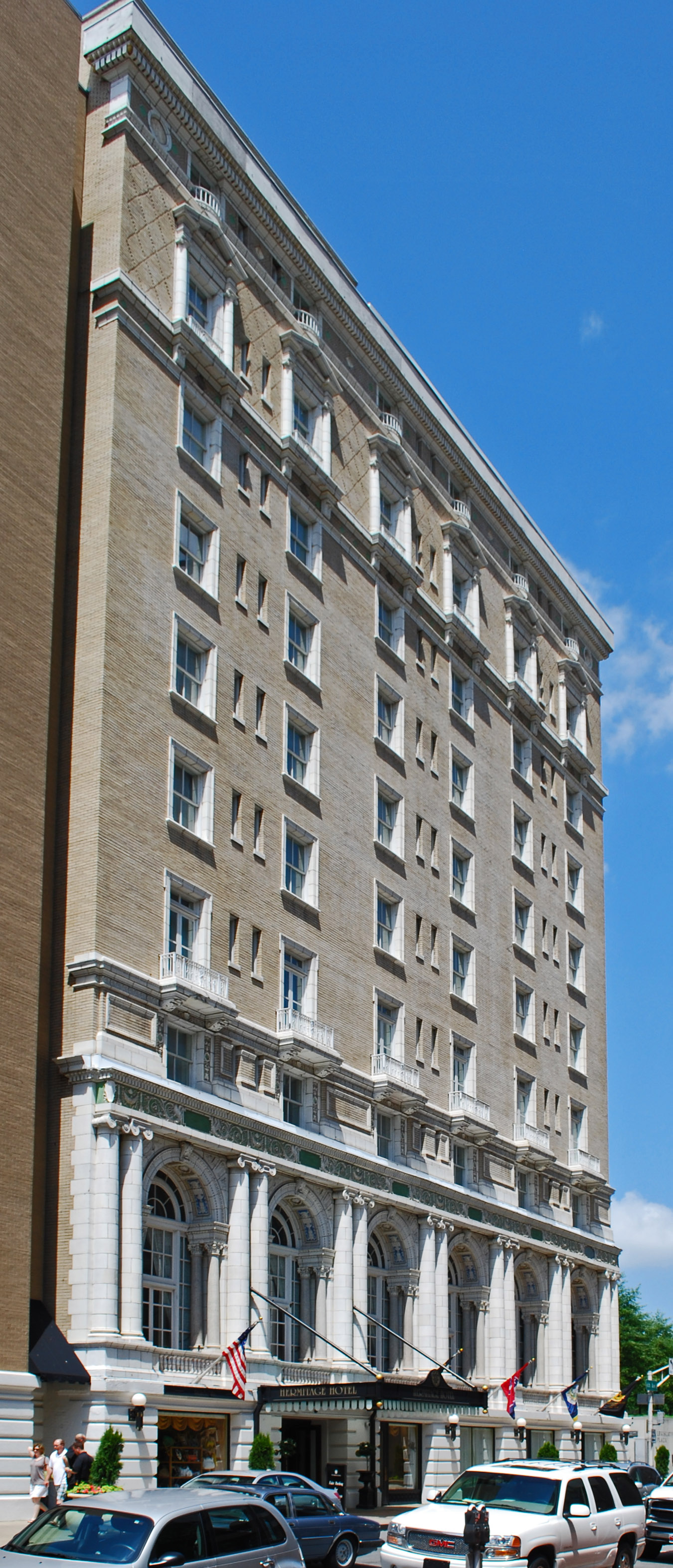
Hermitage Hotel

=== Memphis ===
- Gayoso Hotel
- Hilton Memphis
- Hotel Claridge
- Hu. Hotel
- Madison Hotel
- Memphis Riverline Hotel
- Peabody Hotel

== Texas ==
- Antlers Hotel
- Baker Hotel
- Blackstone Hotel
- El Paisano Hotel
- Gaylord Texan Resort Hotel & Convention Center
- Hotel Beaumont
- Hotel Blessing
- Hotel Galvez
- Hotel Paso del Norte
- Hotel Texas
- Hotel Turkey
- Kendall Inn
- Landmark Inn State Historic Site
- LaSalle Hotel
- Mobberly hotel
- Nueces Hotel
- Plaza Hotel, El Paso
- Plaza Hotel, College Station
- Saint Anthony Hotel
- Settles Hotel
- Stagecoach Inn (Texas)
- Tarpon Inn
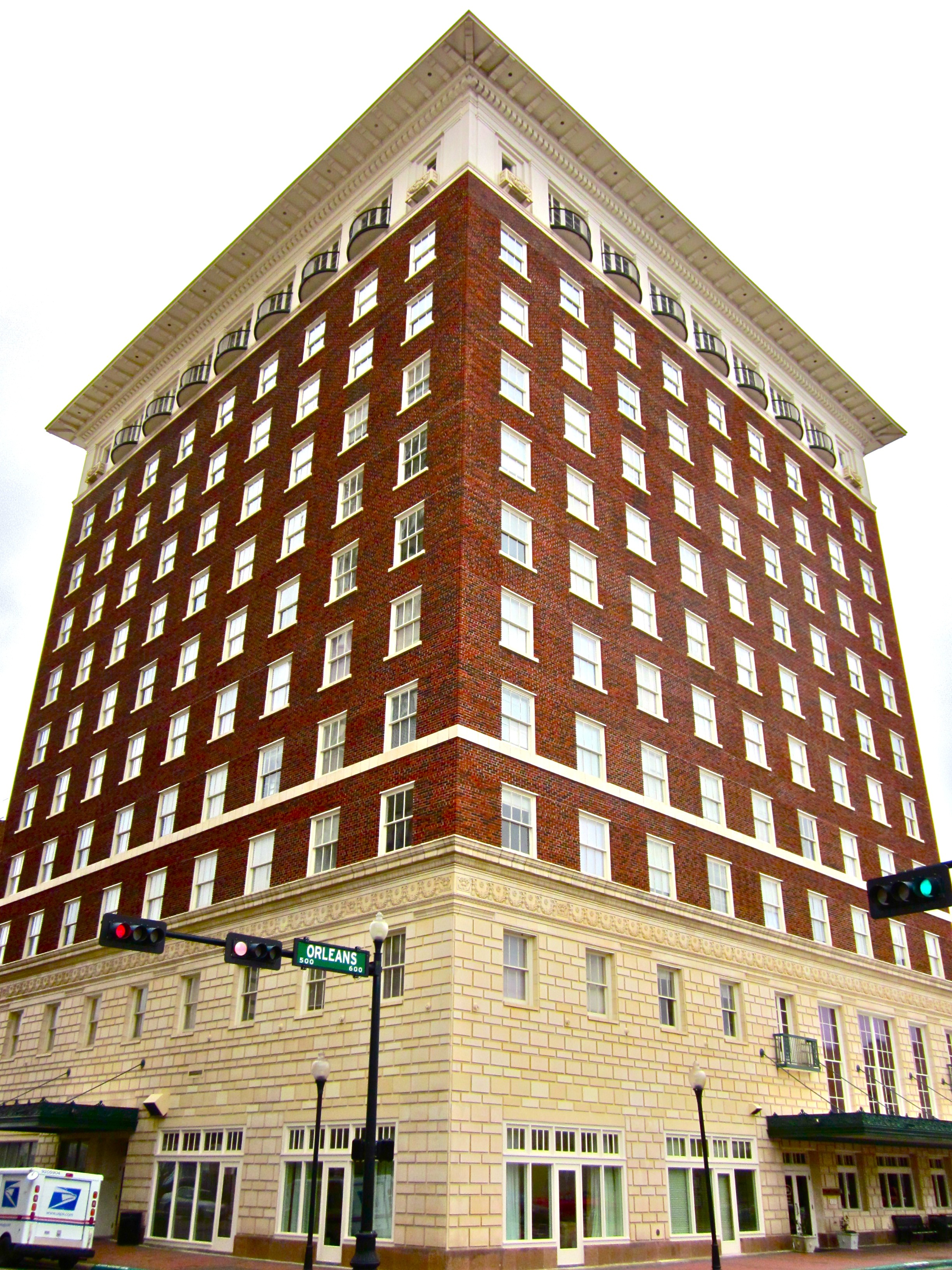
Hotel Beaumont

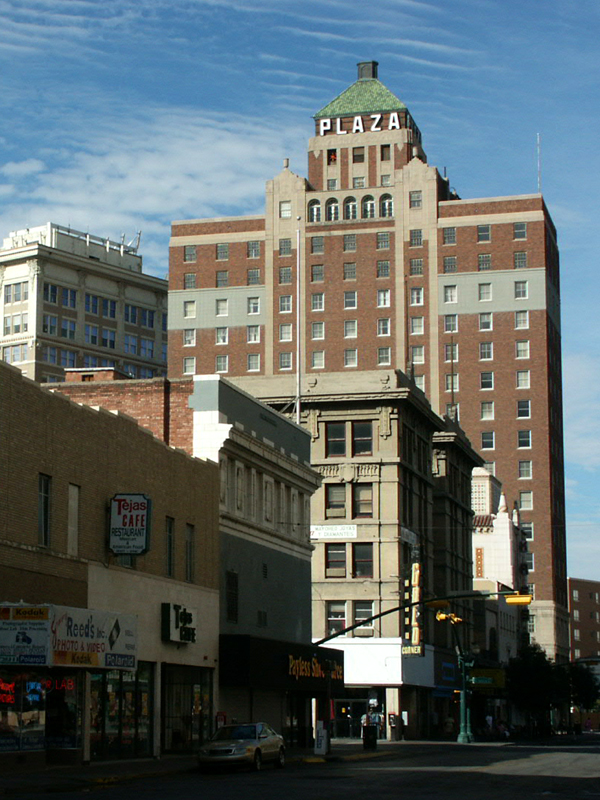
Plaza Hotel (El Paso, Texas)

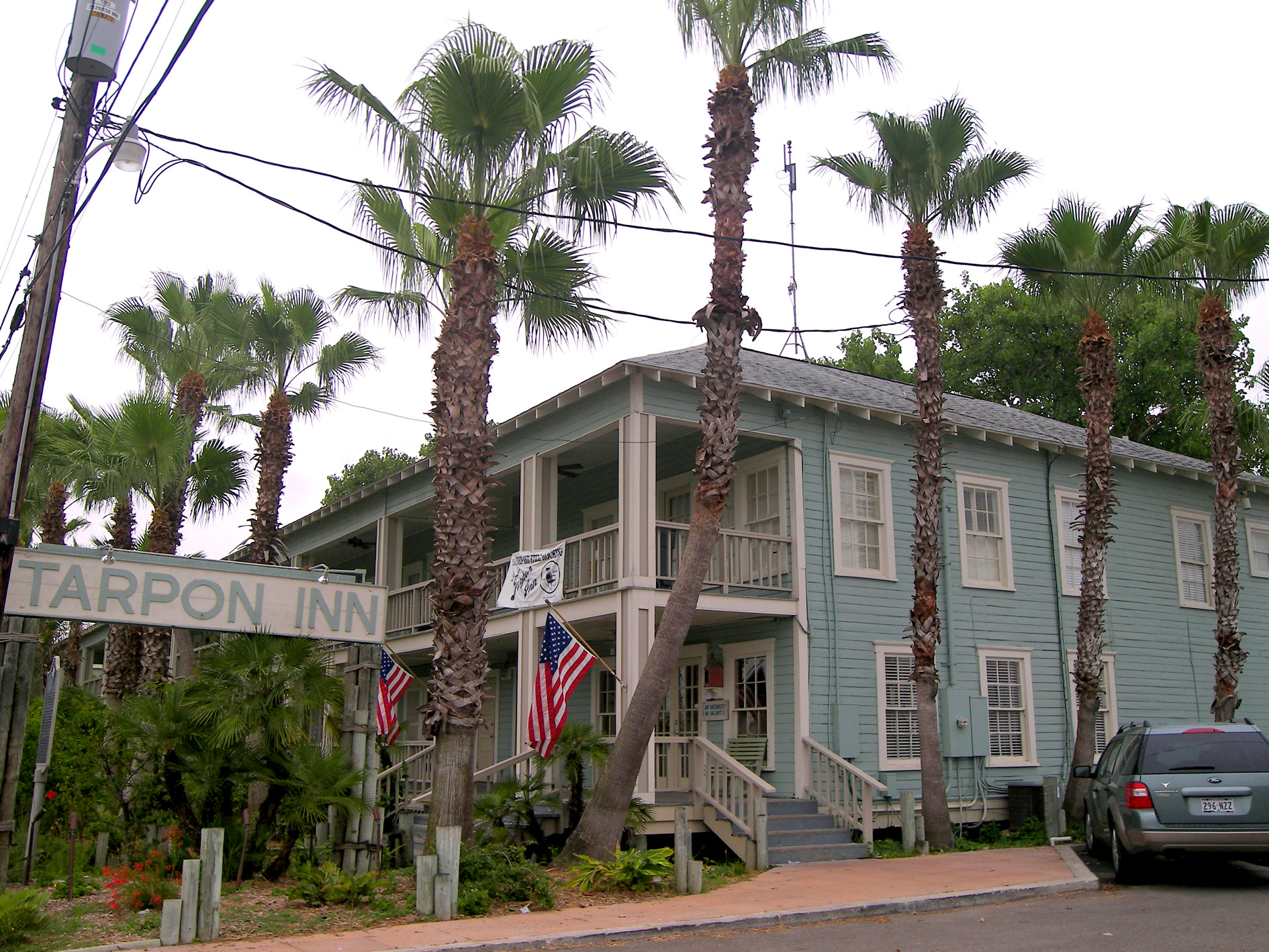
Tarpon Inn

=== Austin ===
- Driskill Hotel
- Four Seasons Hotel Austin
- W Austin Hotel and Residences
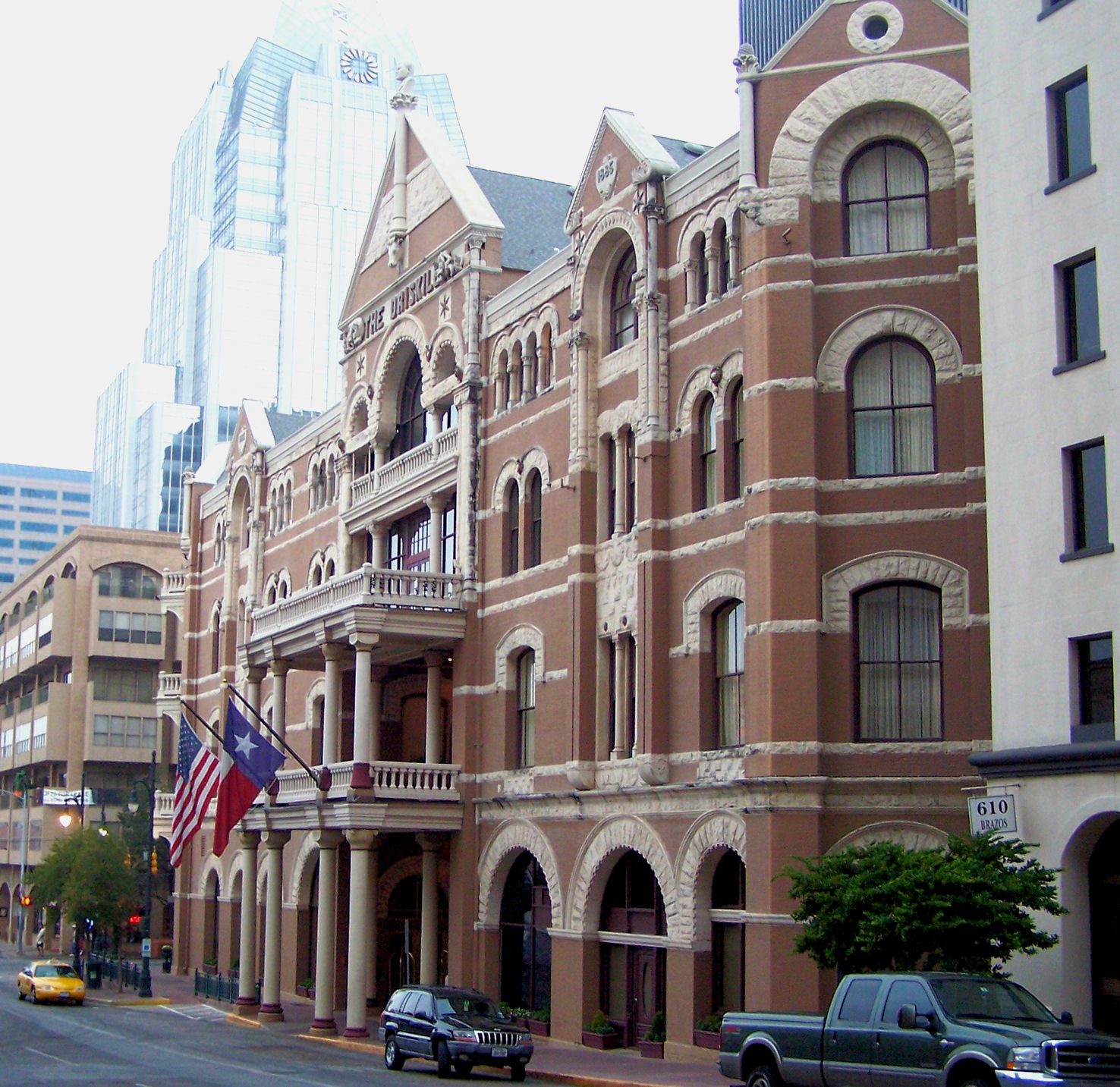
Driskill Hotel

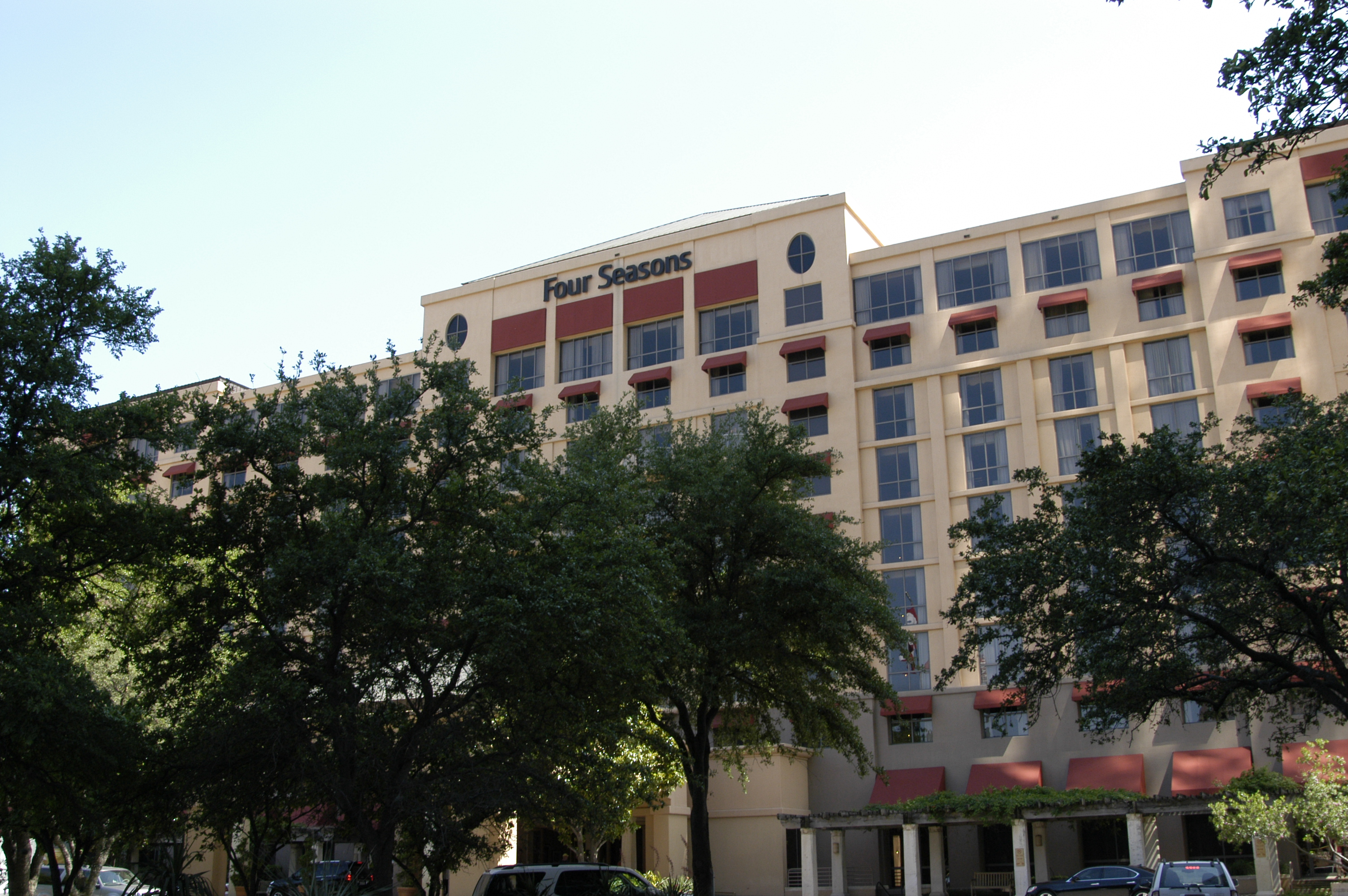
Four Seasons Hotel Austin

=== Dallas ===
- Adolphus Hotel
- Dallas Hilton
- Four Seasons Resort and Club Dallas at Las Colinas
- Hilton Anatole
- Hotel Drover
- Hyatt Regency Dallas
- The Joule Hotel
- Magnolia Hotel
- Omni Dallas Convention Center Hotel
- Renaissance Hotel
- Sheraton Dallas Hotel
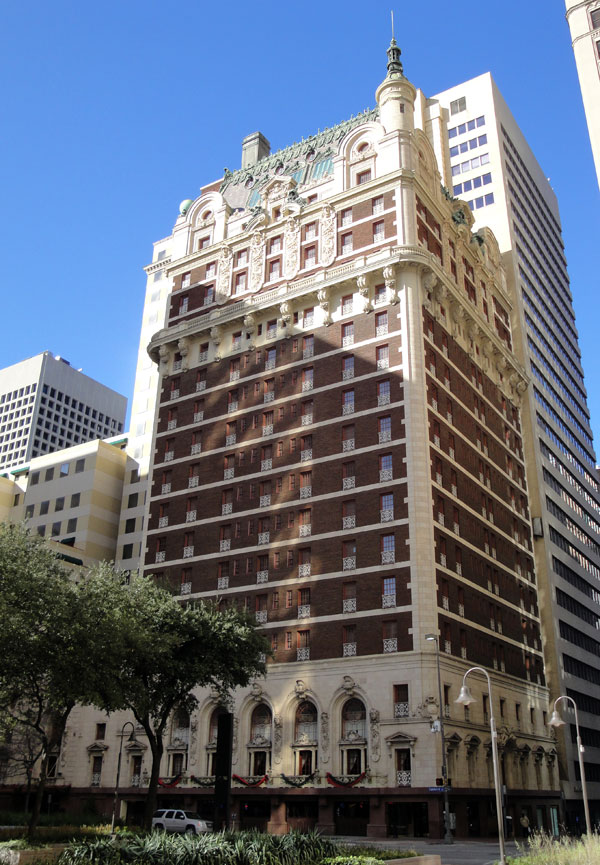
Adolphus Hotel

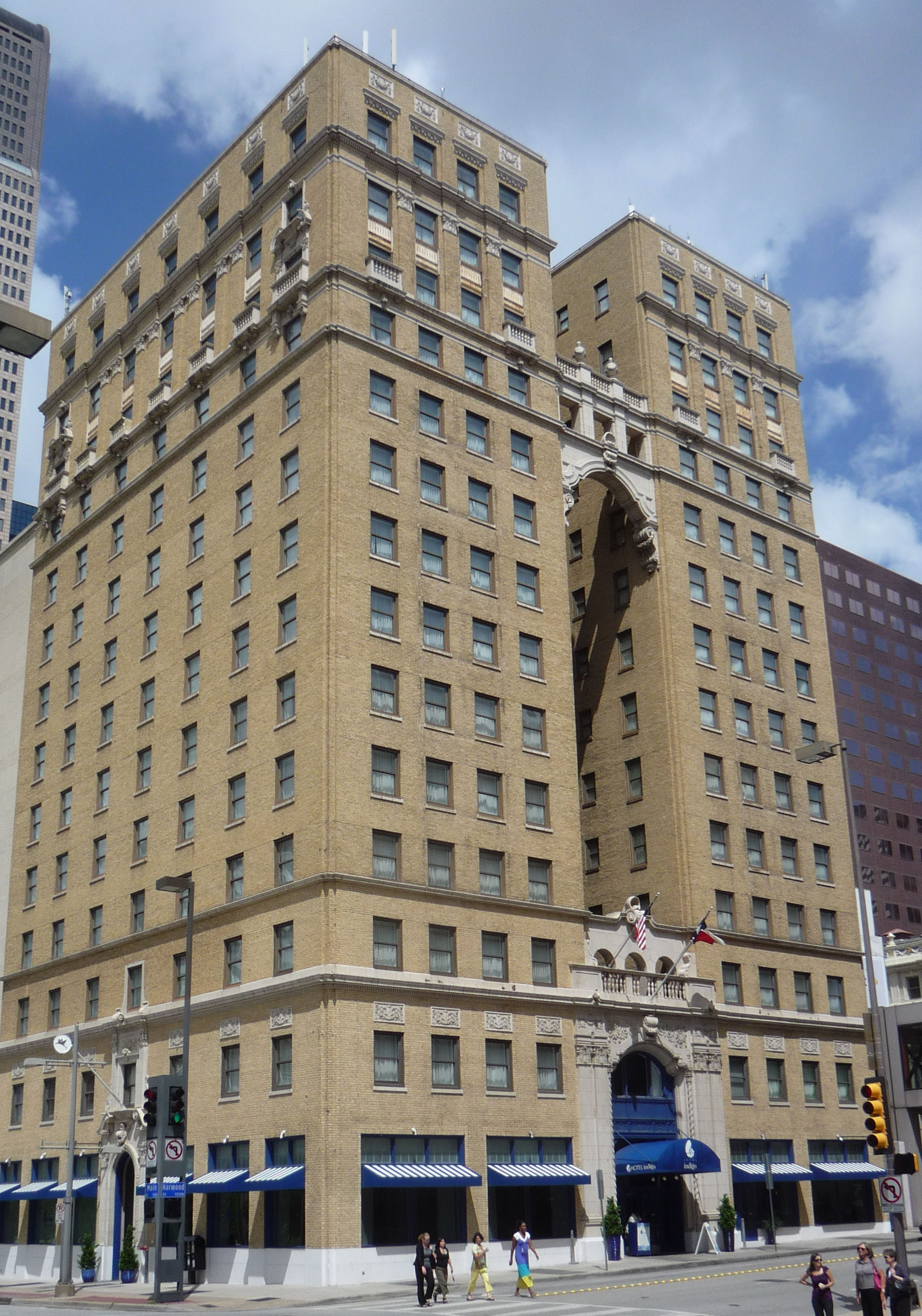
Dallas Hilton

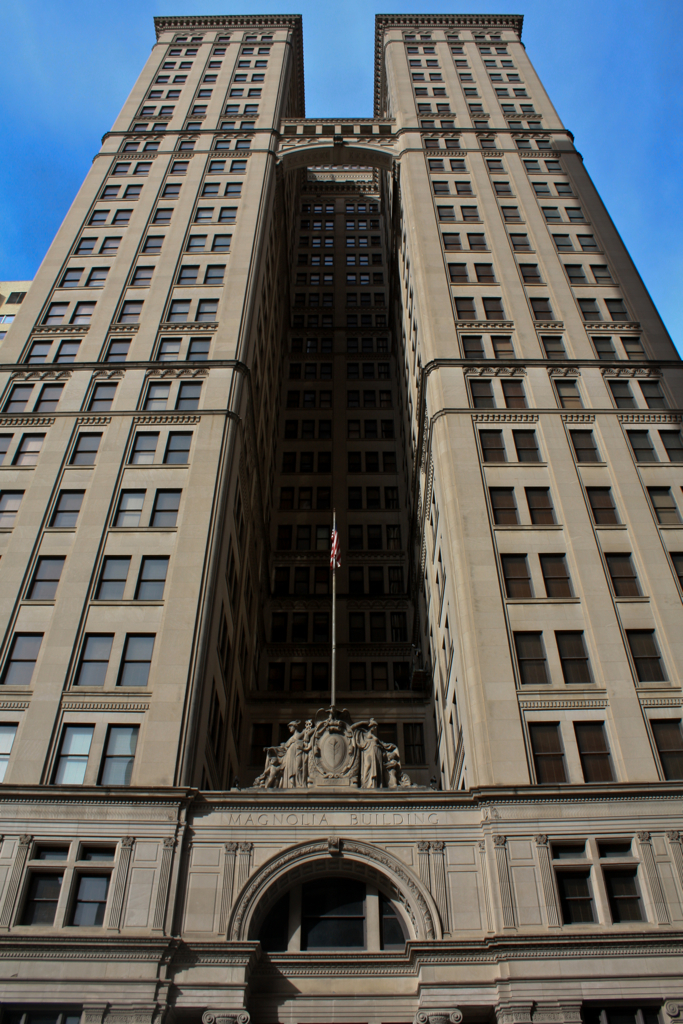
Magnolia Hotel (Dallas, Texas)

=== Houston ===
- Alden Houston
- Club Quarters Hotel
- Four Seasons Hotel Houston
- Hilton College of Hotel and Restaurant Management
- Hotel Icon
- Hyatt Regency Houston
- Kemah Boardwalk
- Magnolia Hotel
- Marriott Marquis Houston
- Shamrock Hotel
- The Post Oak
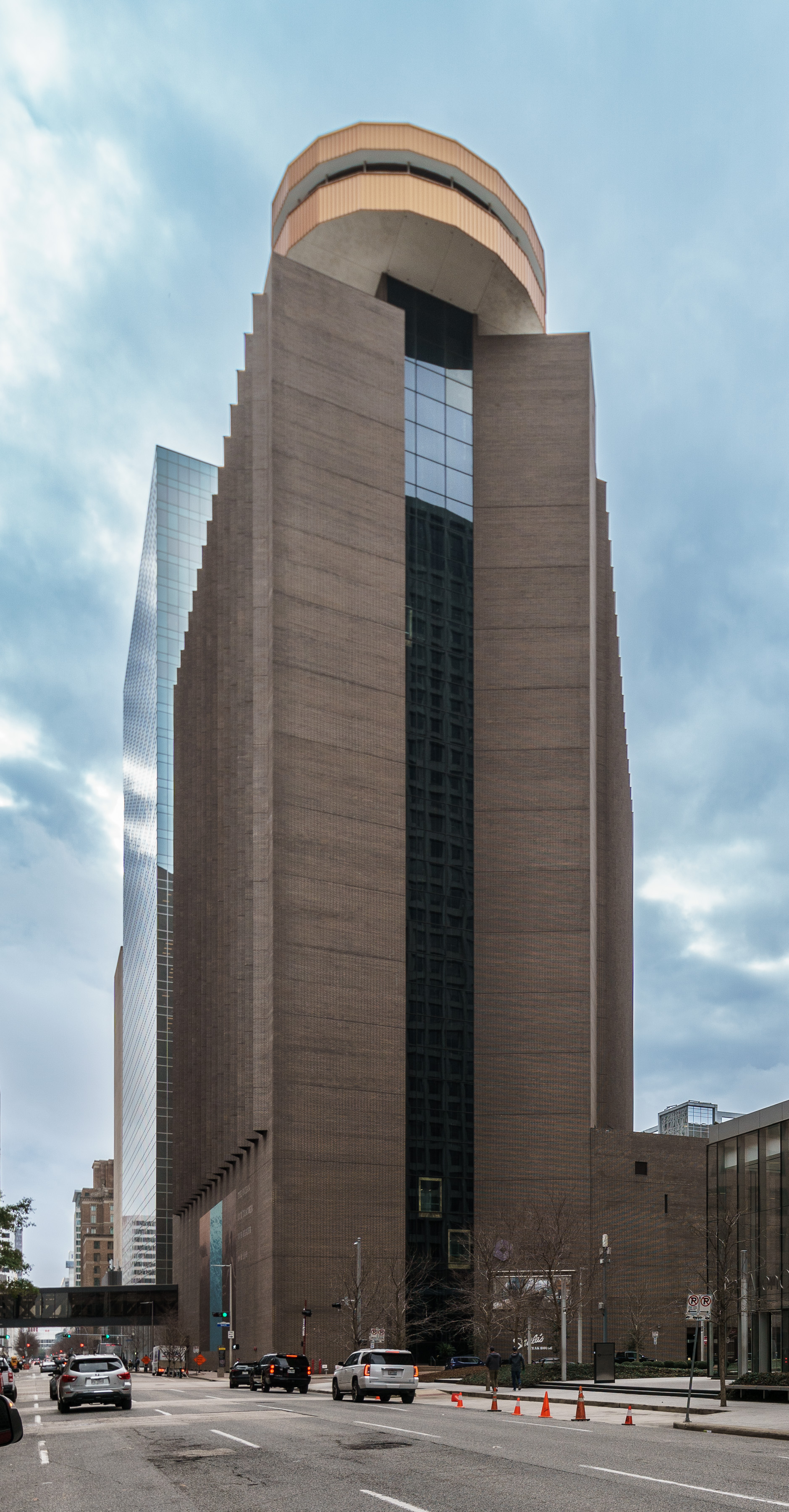
Hyatt Regency Houston

Magnolia Hotel (Houston)

=== San Antonio ===
- Fairmount Hotel
- Grand Hyatt San Antonio
- Gunter Hotel
- Holiday Inn Express Riverwalk Area
- Marriott Rivercenter
- Menger Hotel
- San Antonio Marriott Riverwalk
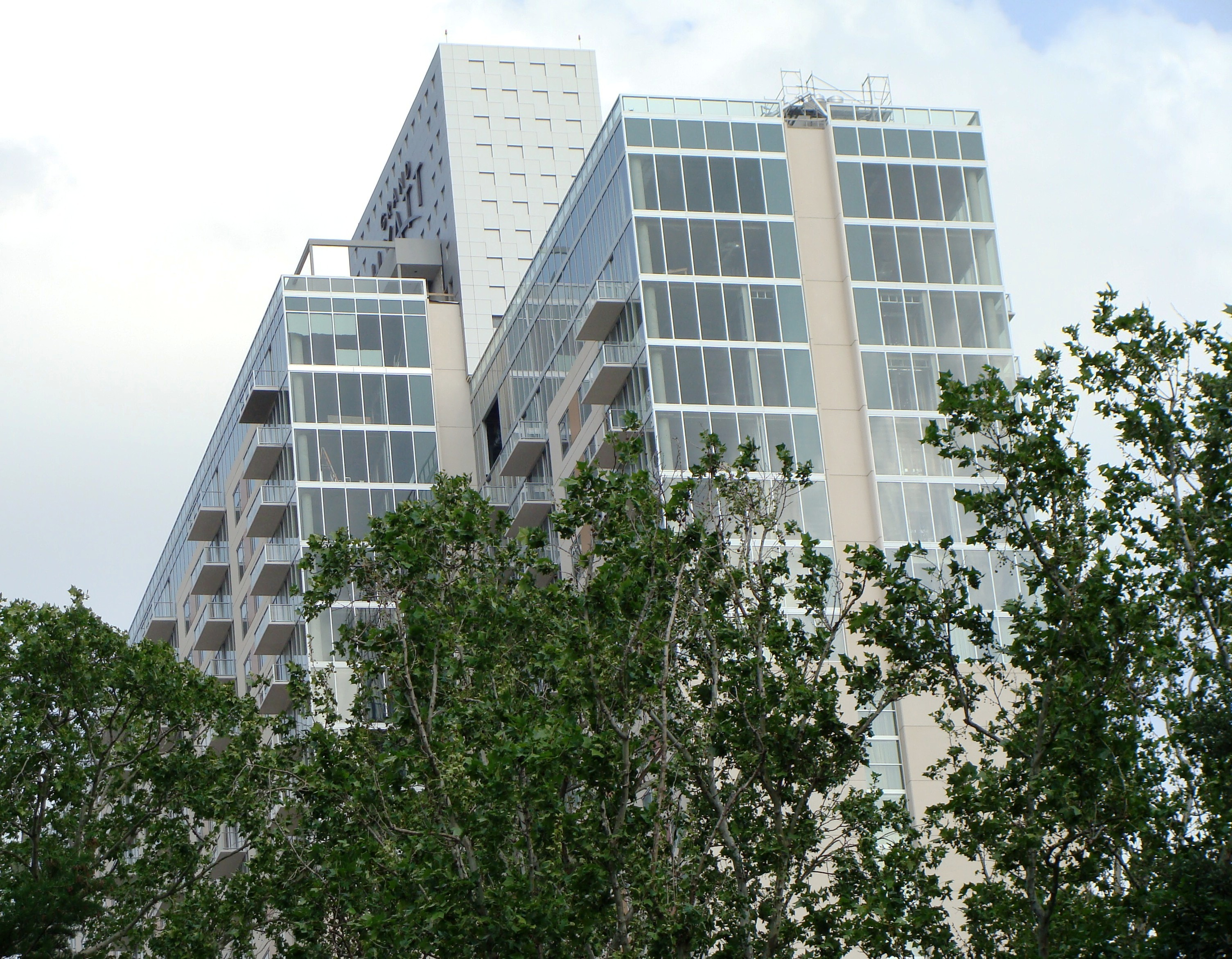
Grand Hyatt San Antonio

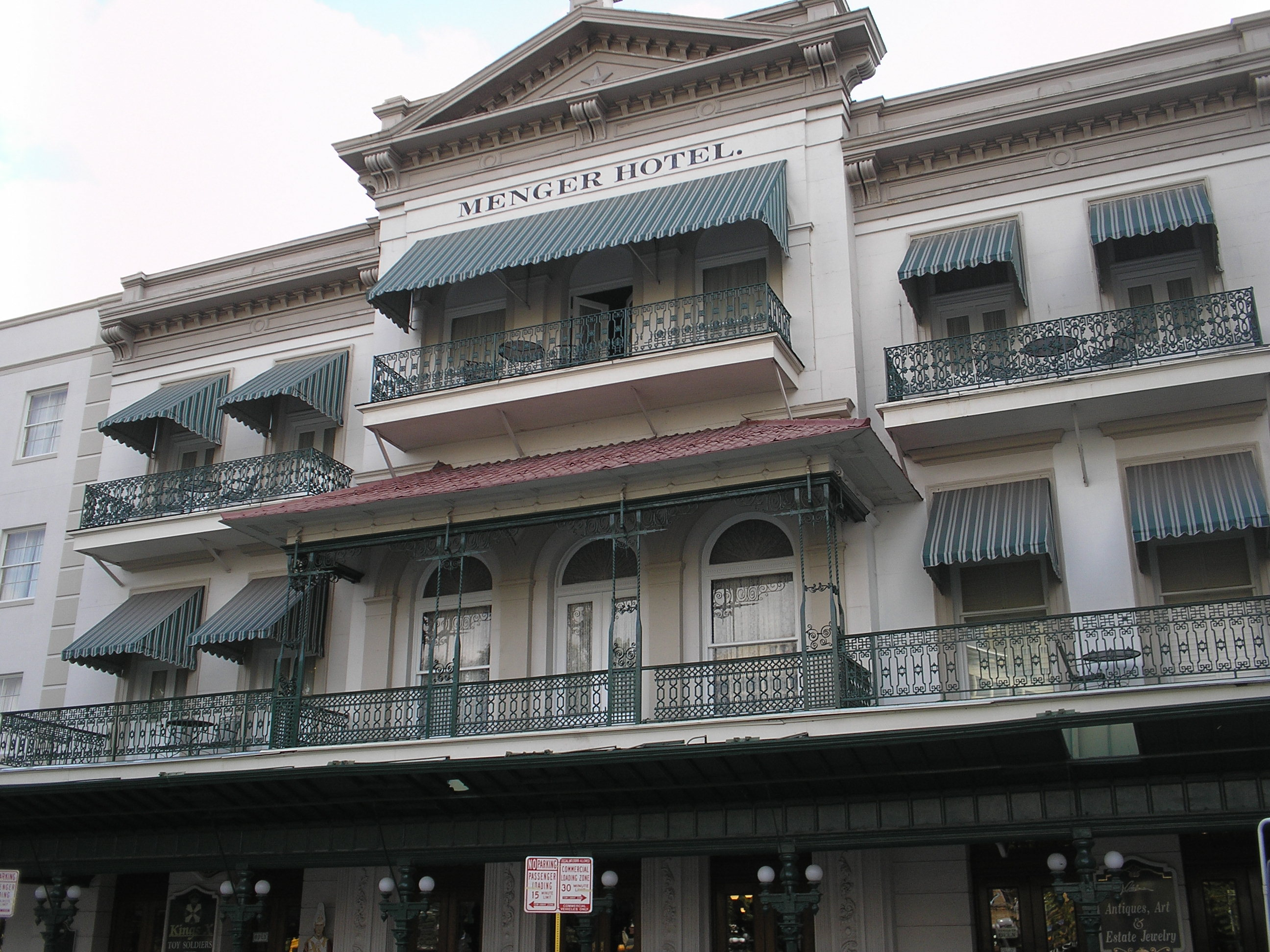
Menger Hotel

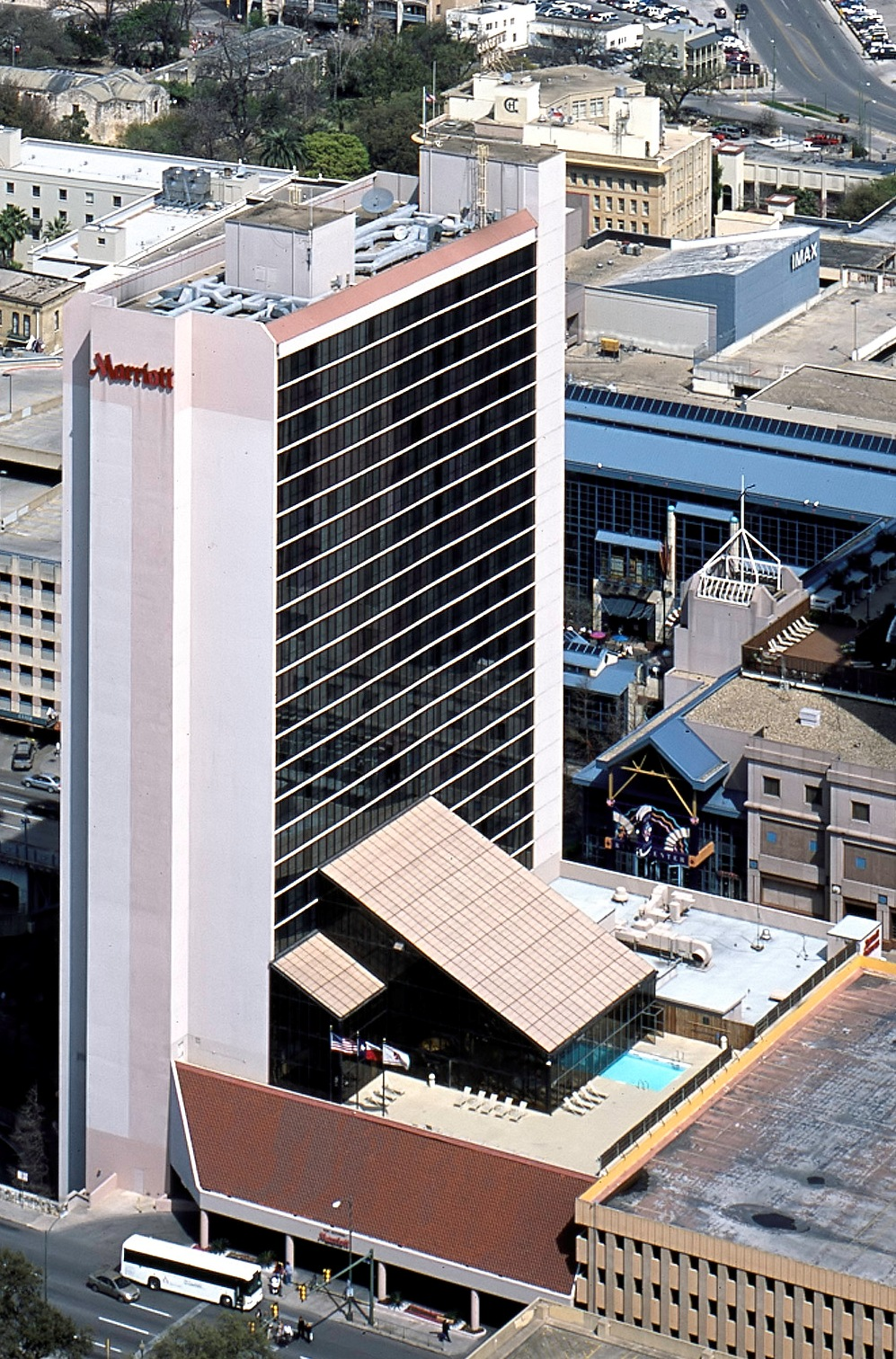
San Antonio Marriott Riverwalk

== Utah ==
- Bigelow-Ben Lomond Hotel
- Bryce Canyon Lodge
- Bryce Inn
- Forster Hotel
- Goulding's Trading Post
- The Grand America Hotel
- Hotel Roberts
- Hyland Hotel
- Joseph Smith Memorial Building
- Knutsford Hotel
- VanFleet Hotel
- Zion Lodge
- Zion Nature Center-Zion Inn
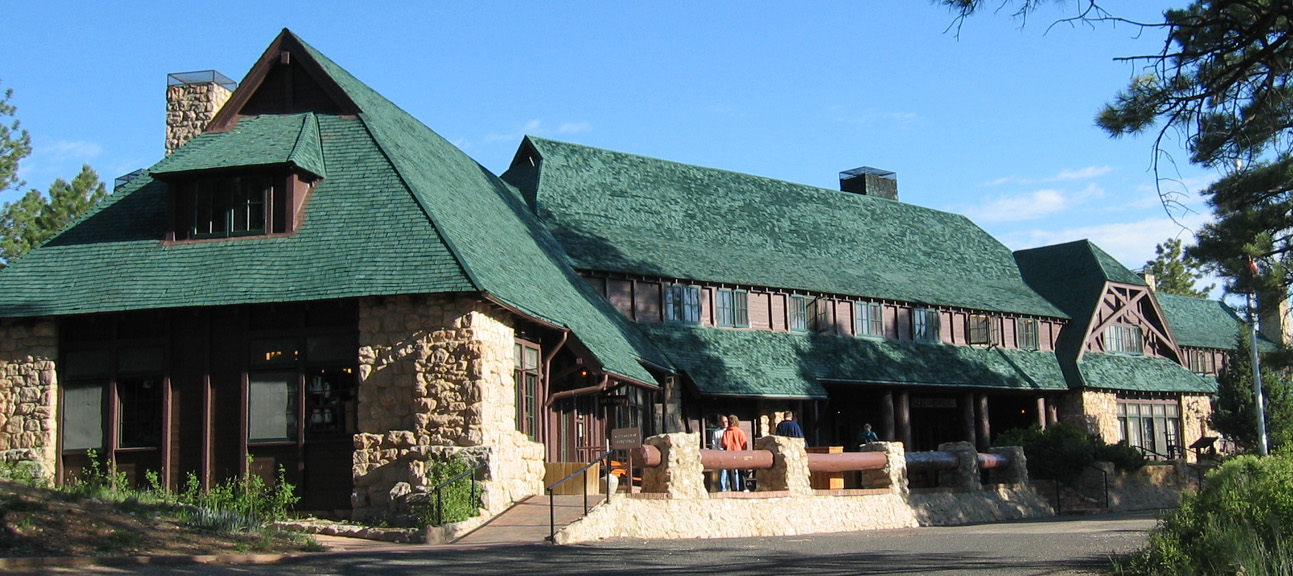
Bryce Canyon Lodge

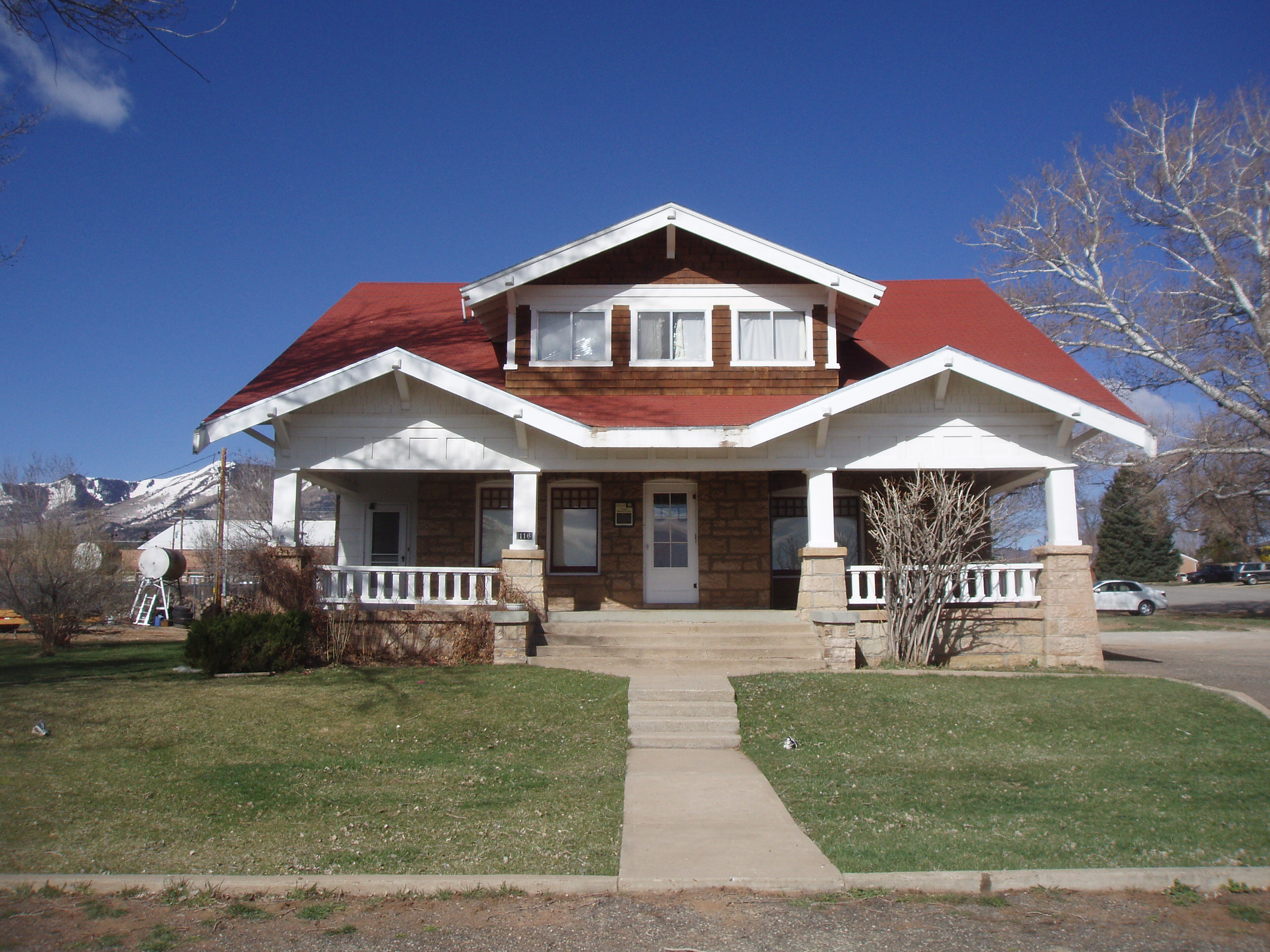
Hyland Hotel (Monticello, Utah)

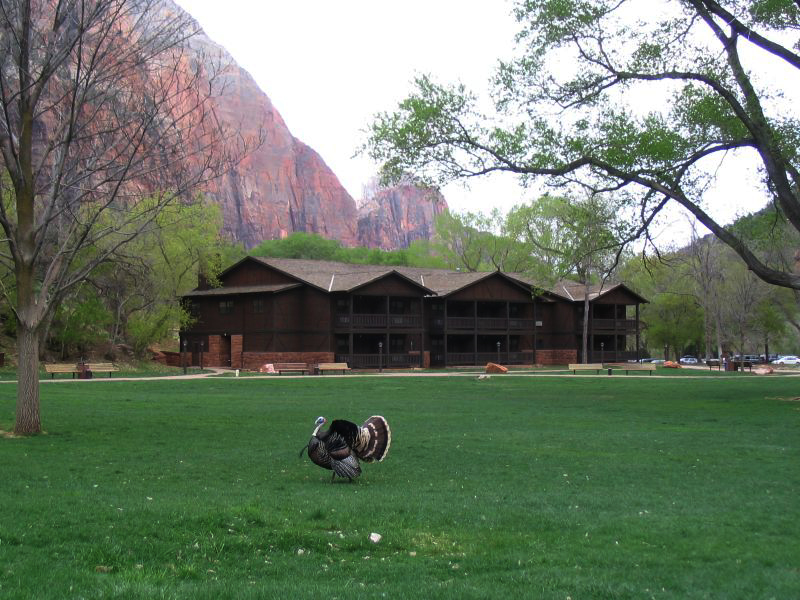
Zion Lodge

== Vermont ==
- The Gables Inn
- Green Mountain Inn
- The Pavilion
- Waybury Inn
- Wilburton Inn
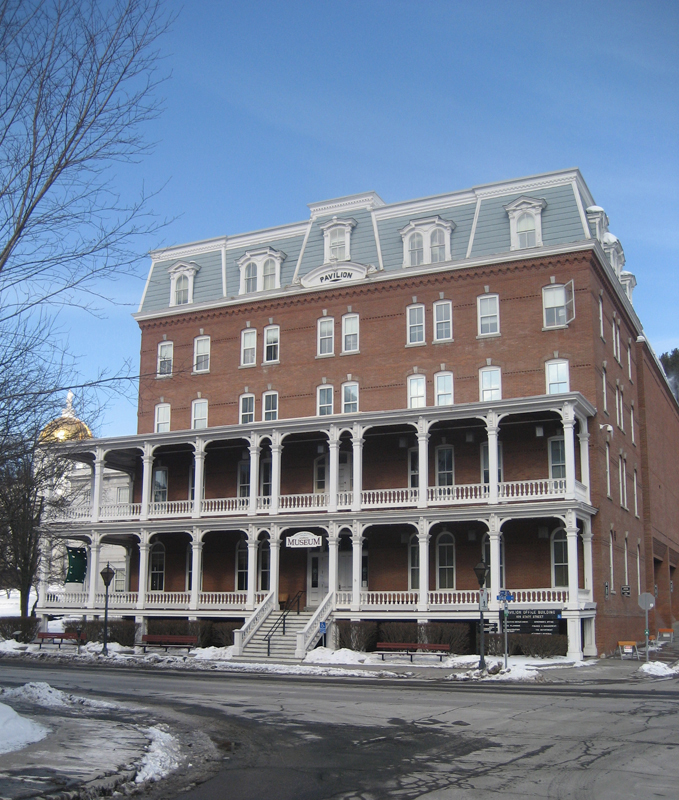
The Pavilion

== Virginia ==
- Colonial Hotel (Wise, Virginia)
- Exchange Hotel (Gordonsville, Virginia)
- The George Washington Hotel
- The Homestead (Hot Springs, Virginia)
- Hotel Roanoke
- Kentucky Hotel
- Martha Washington Inn
- Old Hotel
- Orkney Springs Hotel
- Panorama Resort
- Patrick Henry Hotel
- Skyland Resort
- The Tides Inn

=== Hampton Roads ===
- The Chamberlin
- The Monticello Hotel
- Hilton Norfolk the Main
- Norfolk Waterside Marriott
- Westin Virginia Beach Town Center

=== Richmond ===
- Exchange Hotel
- Hotel Richmond
- Jefferson Hotel
- Murphy's Hotel

=== Staunton ===
- American Hotel (Staunton, Virginia)
- Valley Hotel
- Virginia Hotel

=== Virginia Beach ===
- Cavalier Hotel

== Washington ==
- Ansorge Hotel
- Captain Whidbey Inn
- Creaser Hotel
- Enchanted Valley Chalet
- Evergreen Hotel
- George Washington Inn
- Glencove Hotel
- Lake Quinault Lodge
- Leopold Hotel
- Montgomery House Bed and Breakfast
- Monticello Hotel
- Olympic Club Hotel
- One Lincoln Tower
- Paradise Inn
- Rosemary Inn
- Semiahmoo Resort
- Tokeland Hotel
- Wilson Hotel

=== Seattle ===
- Ace Hotel
- Alaska Building
- Arctic Building
- Butler Hotel
- Camlin Hotel
- The Edgewater
- Fairmont Olympic Hotel
- Globe Building, Beebe Building and Hotel Cecil
- Grand Pacific Hotel
- Hyatt Regency Seattle
- Nippon Kan Theatre
- OK Hotel
- Panama Hotel
- Seattle Hotel
- Sorrento Hotel
- Thompson Seattle
- Westin Seattle

=== Spokane ===
- The Davenport Hotel
- Montvale Hotel
- Ridpath Hotel
- Hotel Lusso
- Otis Hotel
- Hotel Upton

== Washington, D.C. ==
- Capital Hilton
- The Churchill Hotel
- Donovan House
- The Dupont Hotel
- Four Seasons Hotel, Washington, D.C.
- Grand Hyatt Washington
- Hay–Adams Hotel
- Henley Park Hotel
- Hilton Washington
- Hotel Monaco
- Hotel Palomar
- Hotel Rouge
- L'Enfant Plaza Hotel
- Mandarin Oriental, Washington, D.C.
- Marriott Wardman Park
- Mayflower Hotel
- The Melrose Hotel
- Park Hyatt Washington
- The Ritz-Carlton, Georgetown
- The Ritz-Carlton, Washington, D.C.
- Omni Shoreham Hotel
- St. Gregory Luxury Hotels & Suites
- Topaz Hotel
- Willard InterContinental Washington

== West Virginia ==
- Altamont Hotel
- Blennerhassett Hotel
- Capon Springs Resort
- Daniel Boone Hotel
- Elmhurst
- Glen Ferris Inn
- The Greenbrier
- Halfway House
- Hermitage Motor Inn
- Inn at Fowlerstown
- Kanawha Hotel
- Miller's Tavern
- Mountaineer Hotel
- Pence Springs Hotel Historic District
- Red Sulphur Springs Hotel
- Rumsey Hall
- Shannondale Springs
- Tyree Stone Tavern
- Wells Inn
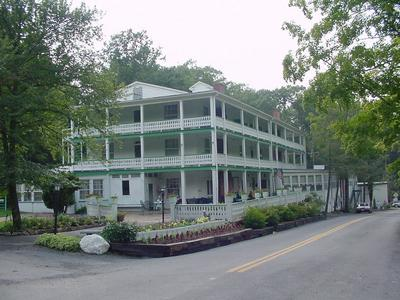
Capon Springs Resort

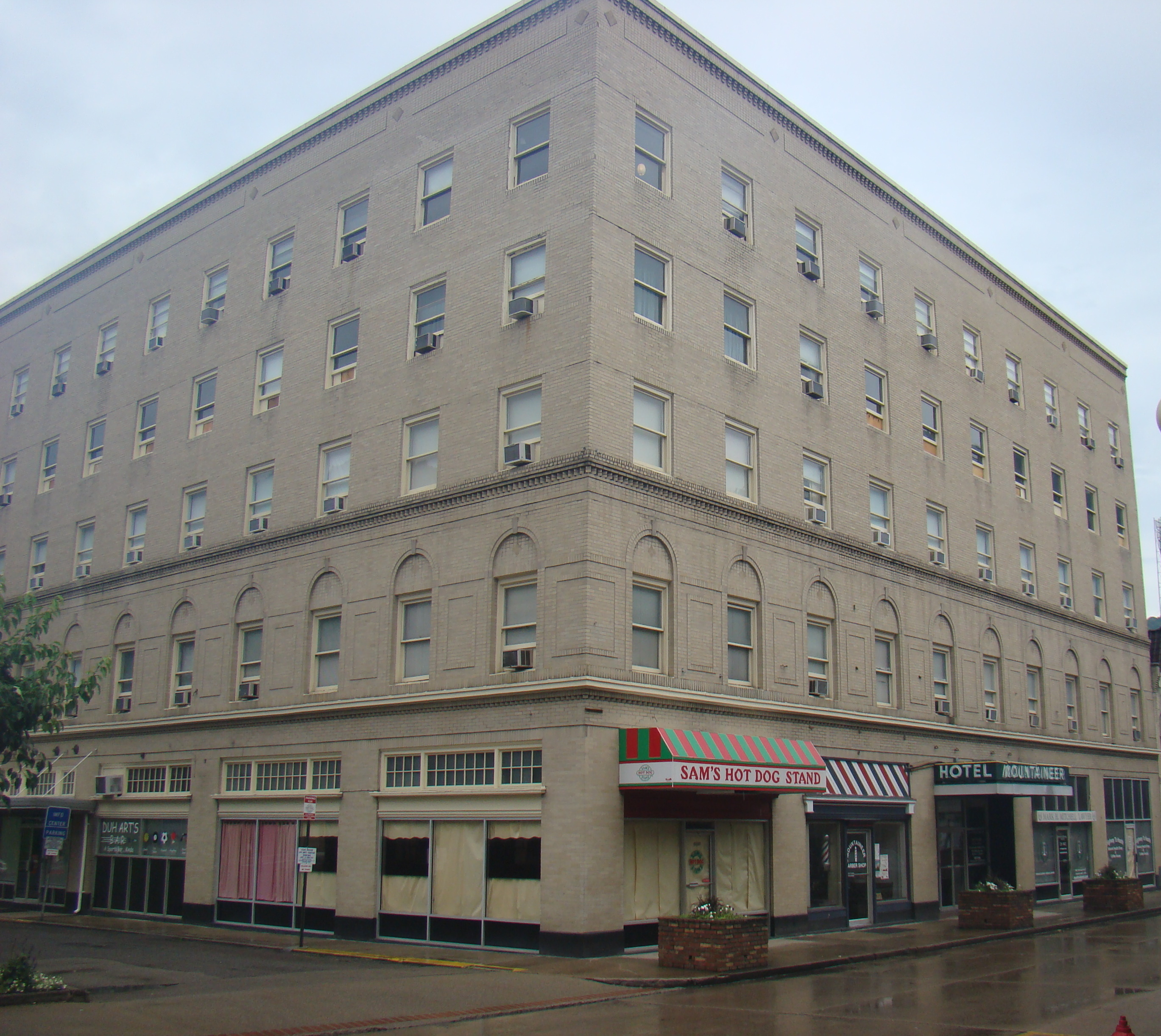
Mountaineer Hotel

== Wisconsin ==
- Astor on the Lake
- Burton House
- Dousman Hotel
- Gilpatrick Hotel, Milwaukee
- Hyatt Regency Milwaukee
- Governor's Mansion Inn, Madison
- Heartland Inn
- Hilton Milwaukee City Center
- Knickerbocker Hotel
- Lake Lawn Resort
- Omaha Hotel
- The Pfister Hotel
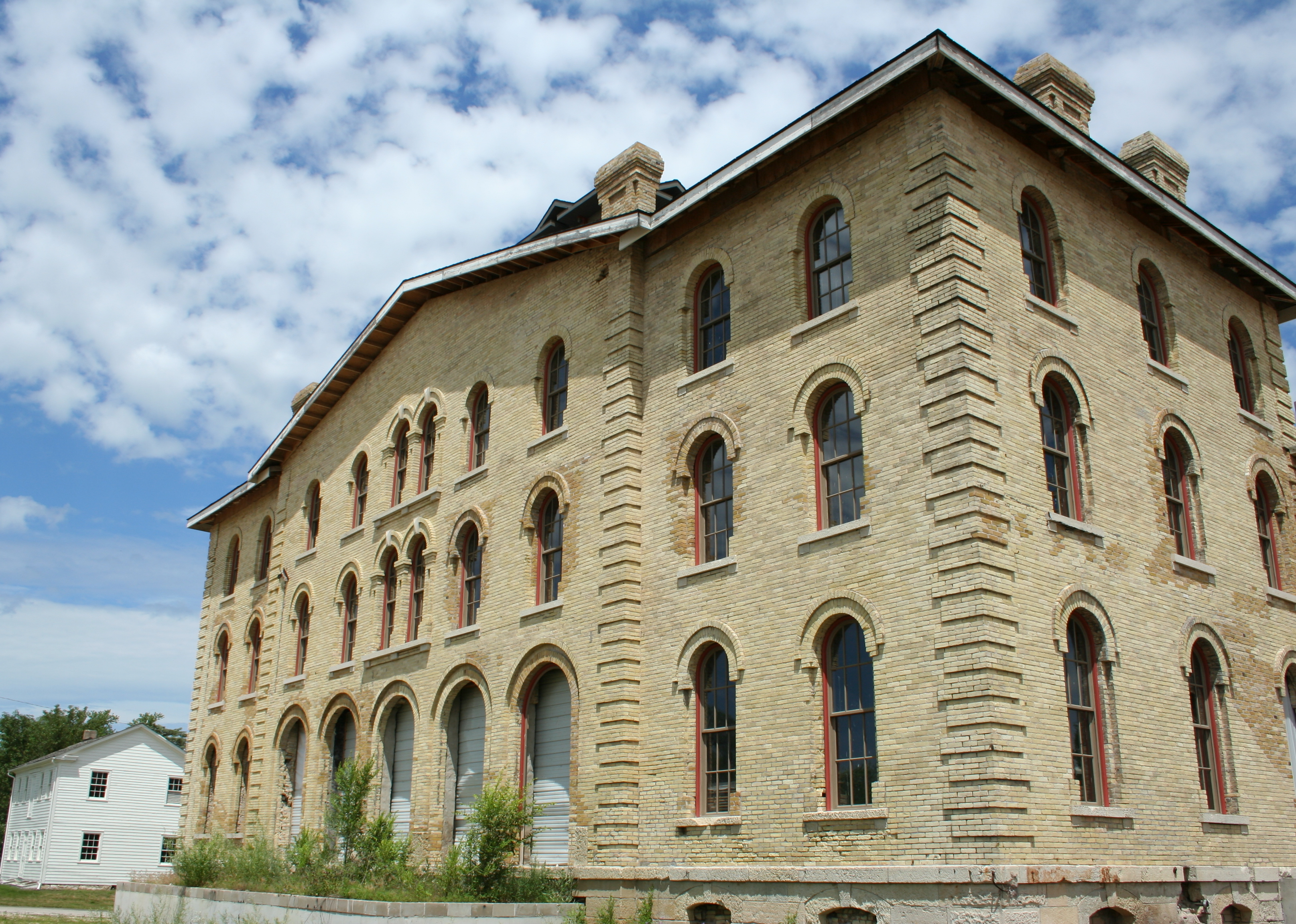
Dousman Hotel

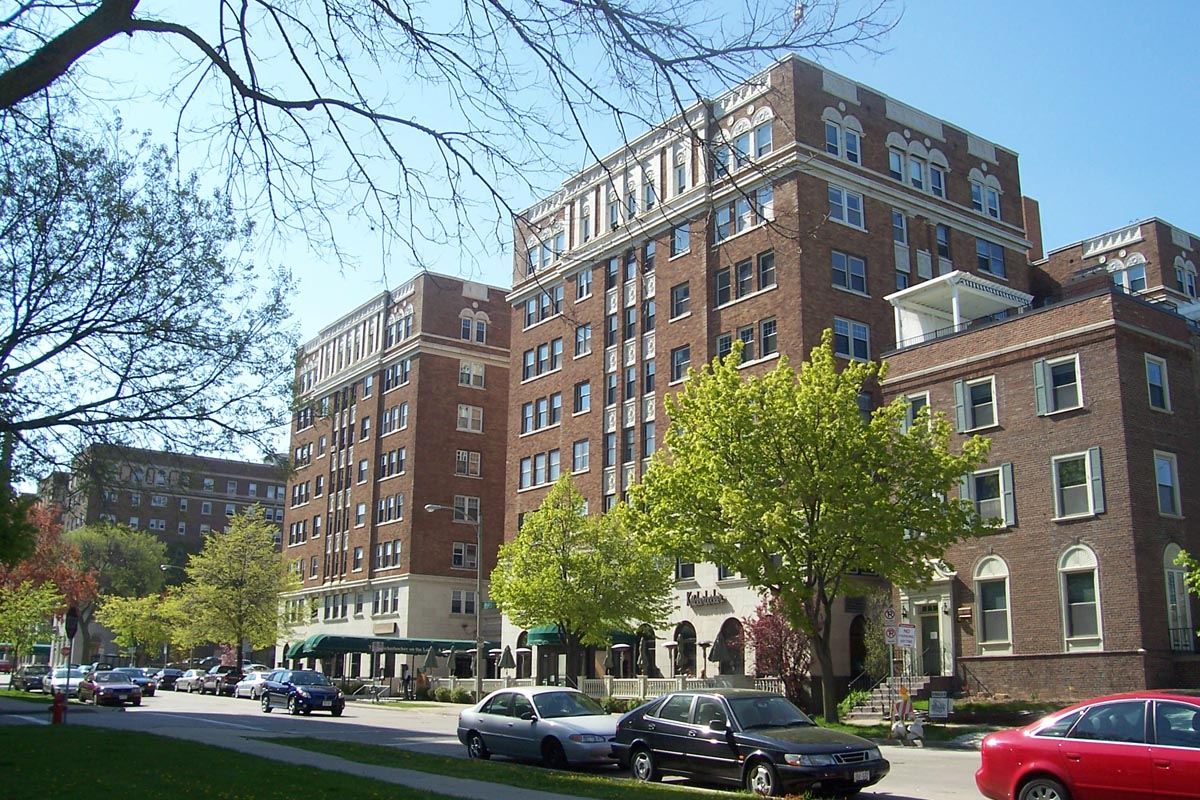
Knickerbocker Hotel

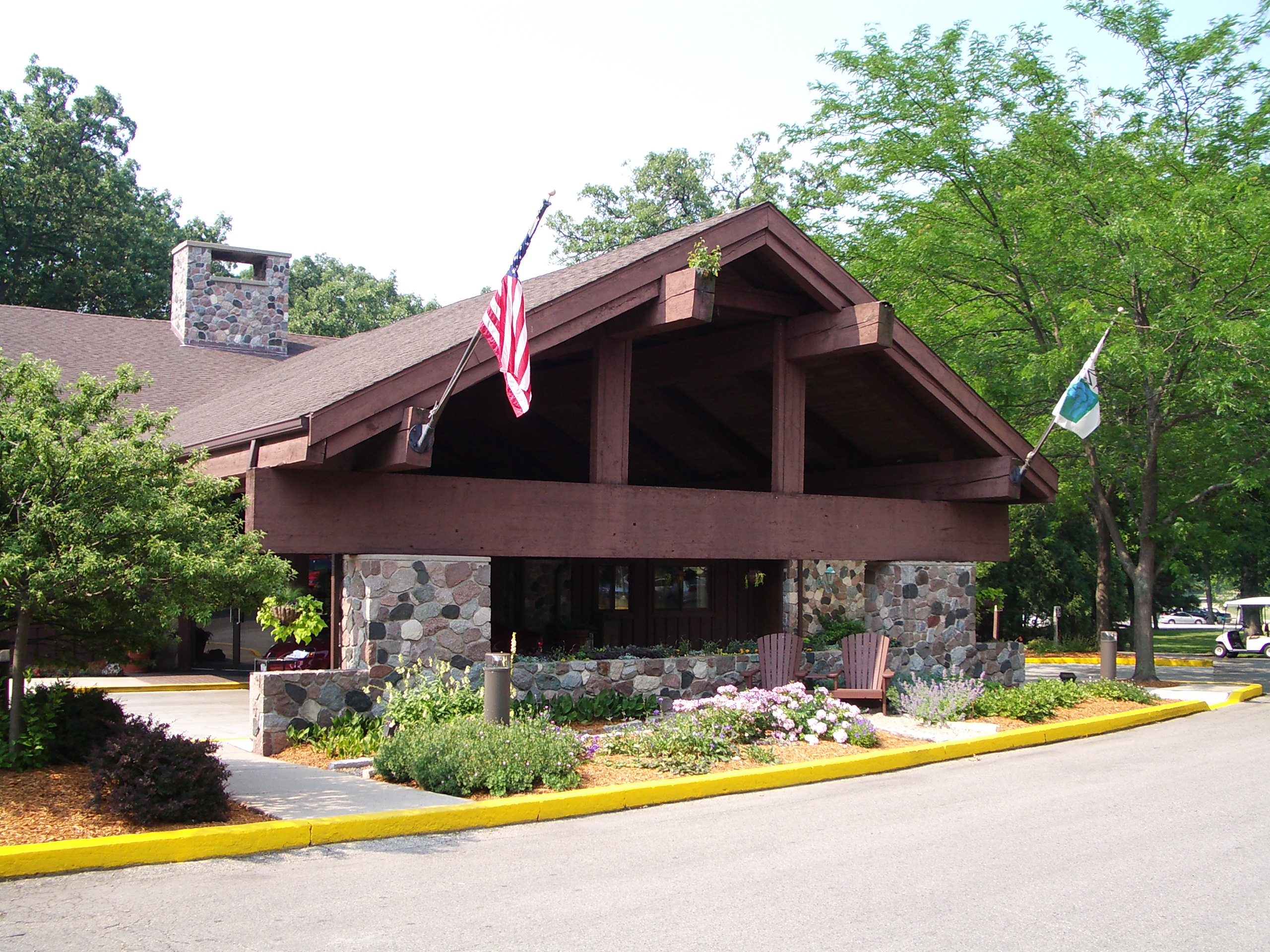
Lake Lawn Resort

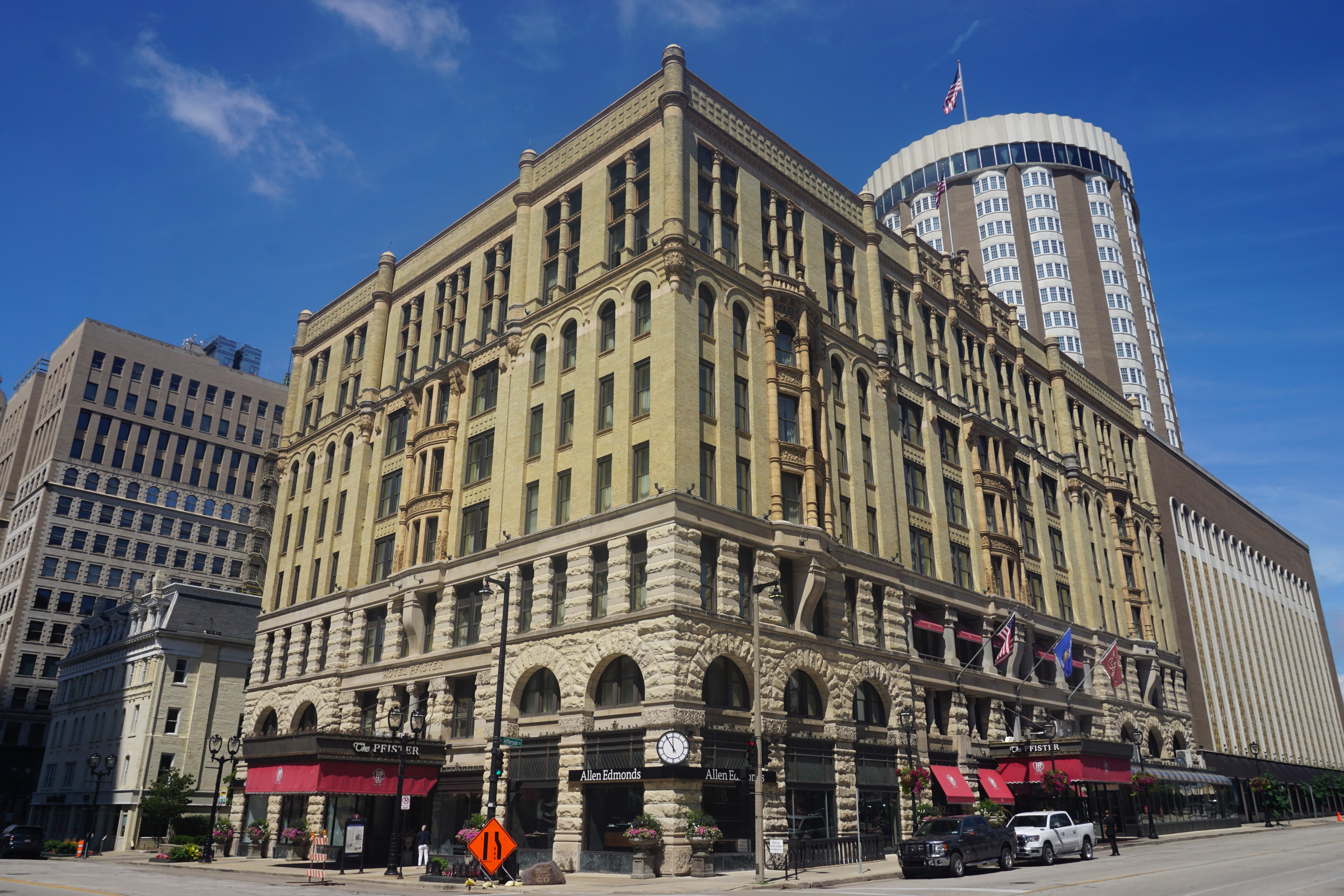
The Pfister Hotel

== Wyoming ==
- Callaghan Apartments
- Cambria Casino
- Canyon Hotel
- Flagg Ranch
- Goff Creek Lodge
- Irma Hotel
- Jackson Lake Lodge
- Lake Hotel
- Libby Lodge
- Log Cabin Motel
- Marshall's Hotel
- Old Faithful Inn
- Old Faithful Lodge
- Sheridan Inn
- Signal Mountain Lodge
- Virginian Hotel
- Wort Hotel

== Territories ==
=== American Samoa ===
- Rainmaker Hotel, Pago Pago
- Tradewinds Hotel, Fagatogo

=== Guam ===
- Hotel Nikko Guam

=== U.S. Virgin Islands ===
- The Buccaneer
- Caneel Bay

== See also ==
- Tourist attractions in the United States
- Lists of hotels – an index of hotel list articles on Wikipedia
- List of defunct hotel chains
- List of motels
