= Glass City Con X Midwest Media Expo =

Multi-genre convention in Toledo, Ohio

Coordinates: 41°38′57″N 83°32′11″W

- Status: Inactive
- Genre: Multi-genre
- Venue: SeaGate Convention Centre
- Location: Toledo, Ohio
- Country: United States
- Inaugurated: 2018
- Most recent: 2018
- Organizer: Defying Conventions / Youmacon Enterprises
- Website: Official website

Glass City Con X Midwest Media Expo was a two-day multi-genre convention held during July at the SeaGate Convention Centre in Toledo, Ohio. The convention was created by the merger of Glass City Con and Midwest Media Expo. This event only lasted a year before becoming inactive with an uncertain future.

== Event history ==
=== Glass City Con X Midwest Media Expo ===
| Dates | Location | Atten. | Guests |
|---|---|---|---|
| July 14-15, 2018 | SeaGate Convention Centre; Toledo, Ohio | | Brad "Duct-Tape" Hale |

=== Glass City Con ===
Glass City Con (formerly GarasuNoShiCon) was an annual two-day anime convention held during July at the SeaGate Convention Centre in Toledo, Ohio. In Japanese, "GarasuNoShiCon" means "Glass City Convention". The convention typically offered anime screenings, an artist alley, a cosplay competition, card and tabletop games, video games, LARP (live action role playing), a rave, vendors, and workshops. In 2010, it held a charity auction that benefited the American Red Cross, and in 2011, it supported Child's Play.

Glass City Con was founded in 2009 by Aaron Auzins and Chris Zasada and was organized by members of the Gamers United, Japanese Club, and Owens' Anime Convention clubs. The convention was originally free to attend in 2010 and 2011 and was held at Owens Community College. It expanded in 2014 and moved to the Seagate Convention Centre. The convention eventually was merged with Midwest Media Expo to create Glass City Con X Midwest Media Expo. This merged event lasted one year before becoming inactive.

| Dates | Location | Atten. | Guests |
|---|---|---|---|
| May 30–31, 2009 | Owens Community College; Perrysburg, Ohio | 500 | Gavin Goszka and Alex Heberling. |
| July 17–18, 2010 | Owens Community College, various buildings Perrysburg, Ohio | 1,100 (Note: Several hundred additional attendees were unregistered.) | Robert Axelrod, Cindy Chu, Anthony Doherty, Gavin Goszka, Alex Heberling, Cassandra Hodges, Julie Jensen, Doc Mack, The Man Power, Kerry Porter, and Salad Time Soldiers. |
| July 9–10, 2011 | Owens Community College, various buildings Perrysburg, Ohio | 1,500+ | Robert Axelrod, Classic l337, Distant Star Games, Anthony Doherty, Gavin Goszka, Tiffany Grant, Matt Greenfield, Doc Mack, The mini-GAME, John Oppliger, Kerry Porter, Salad Time Soldiers, Doug Smith, DJ TKR, and Year 200X. |
| July 26–27, 2014 | SeaGate Convention Centre; Toledo, Ohio | 1,200 | 2D6, Abracadabra Productions, Jessica Calvello, Classic l337, Distant Star Games, Gavin Goszka, Todd Haberkorn, Amy Howard-Wilson, Knight of the Round, Doc Mack, John Oppliger, Salad Time Soldiers, Paul St. Peter, DJ TKR, and David G. Wilson III. |
| August 29–30, 2015 | SeaGate Convention Centre; Toledo, Ohio | | 2D6, Jessica Calvello, Amber Lee Connors, D.C. Douglas, Caitlynn French, Gavin Goszka, Amy Howard-Wilson, Chuck Huber, Amanda Irwin, John Oppliger, The Pillowcases, Monica Rial, Lisle Wilkerson, and David G. Wilson III. |
| July 16-17, 2016 | SeaGate Convention Centre; Toledo, Ohio | 1,600 or 2,000 | Abracadabra Productions, Charles Dunbar, Harp Twins, Amy Howard-Wilson, Daman Mills, John Oppliger, Ken Pontac, Professor Shyguy, Micah Solusod, Jon St. John, Austin Tindle, and David G. Wilson III. |
| July 15-16, 2017 | SeaGate Convention Centre; Toledo, Ohio | | 2D6, Abracadabra Productions, Leah Clark, Charles Dunbar, Harp Twins, Tony Oliver, John Oppliger, and Jad B. Saxton. |

=== Midwest Media Expo ===
Midwest Media Expo (M2X) was an annual three day multi-genre convention held during April at the Edward Village Michigan in Dearborn, Michigan. The convention was organized by the group behind Youmacon. Midwest Media Expo typically offered an artist alley, exhibitor hall, formal ball, gaming (board, card, tabletop, video), musical events, and a rave. Video gaming ran 24-hours during the convention.

Midwest Media Expo in 2017 was to be held at the Edward Hotel & Convention Center, but was cancelled due to a problem with the hotel a few days before it was scheduled to start.

| Dates | Location | Atten. | Guests |
|---|---|---|---|
| April 25–27, 2014 | Detroit Marriott at the Renaissance Center; Detroit, Michigan | | Max Gilardi, Todd Haberkorn, Lewis Lovhaug, Vic Mignogna, Larry Nemecek, Ken Pontac, Adam Smith, David Stanworth, Steam Powered Giraffe, Time Crash, and Aurelio Voltaire. |
| April 10–12, 2015 | Detroit Marriott at the Renaissance Center; Detroit, Michigan | | 91.8 The Fan, Natasha Allegri, Breathlessaire, Mario Bueno, David Eddings, Lindsay Ellis, Eduardo Falaschi, G. D. Falksen, Jackie "Kanashimi" Florian, Harp Twins, Brad Jones, Kawaii Besu, Anthony Kresky, Evelyn Kriete, Lewis Lovhaug, John Patrick Lowrie, Mary Elizabeth McGlynn, Ellen McLain, Andre Meadows, Todd Nathanson, Jessie Pridemore, Scott Ramsoomair, Rantasmo, Malcolm Ray, Jon St. John, Steam Powered Giraffe, Corinne Sudberg, Time Crash, Aurelio Voltaire, Doug Walker, Rob Walker, and Akira Yamaoka. |
| April 15–17, 2016 | Edward Village Michigan; Dearborn, Michigan | Nearly 2,500 | Jeffrey Combs, Steve Downes, G. D. Falksen, Kyle Hebert, Richard Horvitz, Kawaii Besu, Evelyn Kriete, Tawny Letts, Jason Marsden, Jessie Pridemore, Ryter Rong, Jon St. John, Greg Weisman, and Billy West. |

==== Not Con ====
Not Con was a three-day convention held during April at the Radisson Hotel Detroit - Farmington Hills in Farmington Hills, Michigan. It was a free replacement for the cancelled 2017 Midwest Media Expo.

| Dates | Location | Atten. | Guests |
|---|---|---|---|
| April 28–30, 2017 | Radisson Hotel Detroit - Farmington Hills; Farmington Hills, Michigan | | David Eddings and Jon St. John. |

=== Other Related News Articles ===
- The Midwest Media Expo Is Cancelled Three Days Before The Doors Were Set To Open Bleeding Cool, Retrieved 2018-09-20
- Detroit-Based Comic Con Suddenly Cancelled Three Days Before Event (Updated) io9, Retrieved 2018-09-20
