= Youmacon =

Anime convention in Detroit

Coordinates: 42°19′44″N 83°2′22.9″W

- Status: Active
- Genre: Anime, manga, video games, and internet culture
- Venue: Huntington Place
- Location: Detroit, Michigan
- Country: United States
- Inaugurated: 2005
- Attendance: 22,142 in 2017
- Organizer: Defying Conventions / Youmacon Enterprises
- Website: www.youmacon.com

Youmacon is an annual four-day anime convention held during November at Huntington Place in Detroit, Michigan, United States. Youmacon's creation was inspired by other conventions including Anime Central and Ohayocon, with the convention's name coming from the Japanese word for demon or ghost. Founded by Morgan Kollin in 2005, it is the largest anime/gaming convention in Michigan. Midwest Media Expo was the convention's sister event.

== Programming ==
The convention typically offers anime music videos, Artist Alley, Charity Masquerade Ball, concerts, costume competitions, Dealers Room, gaming tournaments, karaoke, Live Action Mario Party and Donkey Kong, live musical performances, maid café, masquerade, Mystery Science Theater 4000, rave, table-top gaming, talent competitions, and video gaming.

The convention runs programming for 24 hours a day in Huntington Place. The walk between the Detroit Marriott at the Renaissance Center and Huntington Place is about 15 minutes. The conventions 2013 Cosplay Ball benefited the Detroit Institute of Arts. In 2009, 2010, and 2014, it benefited the Cornerstone Schools of Detroit. The 2017 masquerade ball benefited the Children's Hospital of Michigan. The 2019 masquerade ball benefited the Children's Hospital of Michigan. In 2026, the Charity Ball benefited Corewell Health Children.

== History ==
The first Youmacon took four years to plan. In 2010, Cobo Center started a $279 million renovation that finished in 2015. The 2012 convention had several complaints including the distance between venues (15 minutes) and registration line times. Youmacon is one of the larger users of the Marriott, and the only event to have all of its meeting space and 1,300 hotel rooms occupied as of 2014. The Renaissance Center prohibited attendees from carrying fake weapons and wearing masks that would hide their faces in 2014. Origa was unable to enter the United States from Canada for her 2014 Youmacon appearance due to not having a P visa. In 2016, the maid café expanded to two days, the Renaissance Center had construction occurring, and panel rooms in the Cobo Center were challenging to locate. Thursdays programming in 2017 did not require registration. The convention improved elevator lines and game room wait times, but the physical schedule copy suffered from errors in 2017.

Youmacon's in person 2020 convention was cancelled due to the COVID-19 pandemic, with an online convention held in its place. Its cancellation was delayed due to contractual issues regarding COVID-19 shutdowns. In 2021, the People Mover between event venues was not available, with the convention offering transportation for specific attendees with needs. The convention was only held at Huntington Place in 2023 and admission was free on Thursday. In 2025, Youmacon added a kids corner, and tabletop gaming received an expansion.

=== Event history ===
Dates	Location	Atten.	Guests
November 11–13, 2005	Hilton Detroit/Troy; Troy, Michigan	1,078	David Anez, Johnny Yong Bosch, Emily DeJesus, Robert DeJesus, Eyeshine, Caitlin Glass, Bruce Kalish, Yuri Lowenthal, Monica May, Vic Mignogna, Tara Platt, Alycia Purrott, Kristine Sa, The Spoony Bards, and Chris Violette.
November 3–5, 2006	Hilton Detroit/Troy; Troy, Michigan	2,125	Captain Lou Albano, David Anez, Chris Cason, Caitlin Glass, Matt Hill, Tony Oliver, Patrick Seitz, Kevin Siembieda, The Spoony Bards, Moy Tung, and Brett Weaver.
November 1–4, 2007	Hilton Detroit/Troy; Troy, Michigan	3,119	Johnny Yong Bosch, Emily DeJesus, Robert DeJesus, Eyeshine, Quinton Flynn, Caitlin Glass, Wayne Grayson, Hyper-Strike, Lemon Demon, Jeff Nimoy, Patrick Seitz, Stephanie Sheh, Michael Sinterniklaas, and The Spoony Bards.
October 30–November 2, 2008	Hyatt Regency Dearborn; Dearborn, Michigan	4,494	Caitlin Glass, Wayne Grayson, Kyle Hebert, Walter E. Jones, Evelyn Lanto, Trish Ledoux, Lemon Demon, Mark Musashi, My Dear Disco, Paul Schrier, Patrick Seitz, Michael Sinterniklaas, The Spoony Bards, and Toshifumi Yoshida.
October 29–November 1, 2009	Hyatt Regency Dearborn; Dearborn, Michigan	6,200	Curtis Arnott, Laura Bailey, Bea Billany, Cowboy Shogun, Scott Frerichs, Caitlin Glass, Wayne Grayson, Kyle Hebert, Anthony Kresky, Nick Landis, Lemon Demon, Lewis Lovhaug, My Dear Disco, Lawrence Simpson, Michael Sinterniklaas, The Spoony Bards, Brad Swaile, Joe "Angry Joe" Vargas, Doug Walker, and Travis Willingham.
October 28–31, 2010	Detroit Marriott at the Renaissance Center; Detroit, Michigan		Curtis Arnott, Bea Billany, Scott Frerichs, Caitlin Glass, Todd Haberkorn, Anthony Kresky, Nick Landis, Lemon Demon, Vic Mignogna, Christopher Robin Miller, Marin M. Miller, Patrick Seitz, Lawrence Simpson, The Spoony Bards, and Brad Swaile.
November 3–6, 2011	Detroit Marriott at the Renaissance Center; Detroit, Michigan	10,375	Sola "BurnYourBra" Adesui, Arc Impulse, Curtis Arnott, Tia Ballard, Bea Billany, Ryan "Inthul" Burke, James Carter Cathcart, Ben Creighton, Scott Frerichs, Yan "Kern" Gagne, Fred Gallagher, Mary "Kite" Garren, Caitlin Glass, Eduardo "PR Balrog" Pérez-Frangie Izquierdo, Josh Keaton, Anthony Kresky, Nick Landis, Reuben Langdon, Lemon Demon, Lewis Lovhaug, Rene "Kor" Maisty, Vic Mignogna, Christopher Robin Miller, Marin M. Miller, Chris Niosi, Rhonda "Tranquil" Patterson, Potter Puppet Pals, Powerglove, Lawrence Simpson, Marc Soskin, Jon St. John, Sonny Strait, Corinne Sudberg, Brad Swaile, Michael "Mookie" Terracciano, and Tom Wayland.
November 1–4, 2012	Detroit Marriott at the Renaissance Center; Cobo Center; Detroit, Michigan	12,156	91.8 The Fan, Tia Ballard, Bea Billany, James Carter Cathcart, Fred Gallagher, Caitlin Glass, Todd Haberkorn, Cherami Leigh, Lemon Demon, Lewis Lovhaug, Scott McNeil, Potter Puppet Pals, Random Gibberish, Paul Schrier, Michael Sinterniklaas, Jon St. John, Steam Powered Giraffe, Sonny Strait, Brad Swaile, Doug Walker, and Shinichi Watanabe.
October 31–November 3, 2013	Detroit Marriott at the Renaissance Center; Cobo Center; Detroit, Michigan	14,496	91.8 The Fan, Curtis Arnott, Tia Ballard, Bea Billany, Ben Creighton, D.C. Douglas, David Eddings, Scott Frerichs, Fred Gallagher, Caitlin Glass, Garth Graham, Todd Haberkorn, Kyle Hebert, Adrian Hough, Chuck Huber, Michele Knotz, Nick Landis, Loverin Tamburin, Lewis Lovhaug, Christopher Robin Miller, Sarah Natochenny, Ken Pontac, Random Gibberish, Anthony Sardinha, Jan Scott-Frazier, Lawrence Simpson, Jon St. John, Steam Powered Giraffe, Sonny Strait, Corinne Sudberg, Sarah "Sully" Sullivan, Brad Swaile, Michael "Mookie" Terracciano, and Tom Wayland.
October 30–November 2, 2014	Detroit Marriott at the Renaissance Center; Cobo Center; Detroit, Michigan	16,300	91.8 The Fan, Curtis Arnott, Tia Ballard, Steve Bennett, Bea Billany, Steve Blum, Kevin Bolk, Johnny Yong Bosch, Ben Creighton, Robbie Daymond, D.C. Douglas, David Eddings, Scott Frerichs, Fred Gallagher, Caitlin Glass, Todd Haberkorn, Michael Hecht, Anthony Kresky, Lauren Landa, Nick Landis, Lewis Lovhaug, Joel McDonald, Jessi Nowack, Tony Oliver, Ken Pontac, Raj Ramayya, Random Gibberish, Tyson Rinehart, Anthony Sardinha, Jan Scott-Frazier, Patrick Seitz, Lawrence Simpson, Meredith Sims, Ian Sinclair, Jon St. John, Steam Powered Giraffe, Ciarán Strange, Corinne Sudberg, Brad Swaile, David Vincent, Howard Wang, Noah Watts, and Tom Wayland.
October 29–November 1, 2015	Detroit Marriott at the Renaissance Center; Cobo Center; Detroit, Michigan	19,200	91.8 The Fan, Curtis Arnott, Bea Billany, Amber Lee Connors, Robbie Daymond, Lucien Dodge, D.C. Douglas, David Eddings, Carlos Ferro, Scott Frerichs, Todd Haberkorn, Mike Hecht, Adrian Hough, Chuck Huber, Nick Landis, Lewis Lovhaug, Joel McDonald, Erica Mendez, Vic Mignogna, Jessi Nowack, Lisa Ortiz, Ken Pontac, Random Gibberish, Anthony Sardinha, Lawrence Simpson, Ian Sinclair, Jon St. John, Steam Powered Giraffe, Ciarán Strange, Corinne Sudberg, Brad Swaile, Austin Tindle, Cristina Vee, and Crush 40.
November 3–6, 2016	Detroit Marriott at the Renaissance Center; Cobo Center; Detroit, Michigan	21,036	91.8 The Fan, Curtis Arnott, Kevin Bolk, Chris Cason, Ben Creighton, David Eddings, Scott Frerichs, Fred Gallagher, Todd Haberkorn, Kyle Hebert, Nick Landis, Comfort Love, Lewis Lovhaug, Yuri Lowenthal, Joel McDonald, Vic Mignogna, Lisa Ortiz, Tara Platt, Chris Rager, Monica Rial, Ryter Rong, Anthony Sardinha, Ian Sinclair, Michael Sinterniklaas, Jon St. John, Steam Powered Giraffe, Ciarán Strange, J. Michael Tatum, Austin Tindle, Cristina Vee, Lex Winter, and Adam Withers.
November 2–5, 2017	Detroit Marriott at the Renaissance Center; Cobo Center; Detroit, Michigan	22,142	91.8 The Fan, Steve Bennett, Kevin Bolk, Dameon Clarke, Samuel "Uncle Kage" Conway, Mr. Creepy Pasta, D.C. Douglas, David Eddings, Chad Evett, G. D. Falksen, Fred Gallagher, Todd Haberkorn, Junichi Hayama, Sawa Kato, Kawaii Besu, Evelyn Kriete, Tawny Letts, Erica Lindbeck, Andrew Love, Comfort Love, Lewis Lovhaug, Bryan Massey, Joel McDonald, Mega Ran, Vic Mignogna, Randy Milholland, Cassandra Lee Morris, NateWantsToBattle, Jake Paque, Tyson Rinehart, Ring of Steel, Keith Silverstein, Ian Sinclair, Jon St. John, Ciarán Strange, Eric Stuart, Austin Tindle, Cristina Vee, Billy West, and Mamoru Yokota.
November 1–4, 2018	Detroit Marriott at the Renaissance Center; Cobo Center; Detroit, Michigan	21,000+ (est.).	91.8 The Fan, Kevin Bolk, Capcom Live!, Ray Chase, Samuel "Uncle Kage" Conway, Robbie Daymond, Richard Epcar, Fred Gallagher, Brad "Duct-Tape" Hale, Junichi Hayama, Samantha Inoue-Harte, Anthony Kresky, Wendee Lee, Cherami Leigh, Comfort Love, Jason Charles Miller, Max Mittelman, Lisa Ortiz, Jake Paque, Ring of Steel, Carrie Savage, Erica Schroeder, Hiroshi Shiibashi, Shigefumi Shingaki, Michael Sinterniklaas, Jon St. John, Ellyn Stern, J. Michael Tatum, Adam Withers, and Mamoru Yokota.
October 31–November 3, 2019	Detroit Marriott at the Renaissance Center; TCF Center; Detroit, Michigan		Bennett Abara, Dameon Clarke, Trae Dorn, D.C. Douglas, Maile Flanagan, Jim Foronda, Fred Gallagher, Brianna Knickerbocker, Comfort Love, Yuri Lowenthal, Mark C. MacKinnon, Mega Ran, Colleen O'Shaughnessey, Tara Platt, Tyson Rinehart, Ring of Steel, Tara Sands, Scarfing Scarves, Shing02, Micah Solusod, Jon St. John, Ciarán Strange, Substantial, Corinne Sudberg, David Vincent, and Adam Withers.
October 29–November 1, 2020	Online convention		
October 28–31, 2021	Detroit Marriott at the Renaissance Center; TCF Center; Detroit, Michigan		Mori Calliope, SungWon Cho, Blake Anthony Foster, MC Frontalot, Katelyn Gault, Walter E. Jones, Billy Kametz, Takanashi Kiara, MC Lars, Cricket Leigh, Erica Lindbeck, Comfort Love, Kyle McCarley, Joel McDonald, Mega Ran, Michaela Jill Murphy, Tony Oliver, Tyson Rinehart, Zeno Robinson, Schäffer the Darklord, Jonah Scott, Keith Silverstein, Ciarán Strange, Corinne Sudberg, and Adam Withers.
November 3–6, 2022	Detroit Marriott at the Renaissance Center; Huntington Place; Detroit, Michigan		A.J. Beckles, Kara Edwards, Blake Anthony Foster, Katelyn Gault, Walter E. Jones, Anthony Kresky, Comfort Love, Kyle McCarley, Brandon Jay McLaren, Mega Ran, Kayli Mills, Tony Oliver, Chris Patton, Anairis Quiñones, Jonah Scott, Keith Silverstein, Selwyn Jaydon Ward, and Adam Withers.
November 2–5, 2023	Huntington Place; Detroit, Michigan		Griffin Burns, Ian James Corlett, Tracy Lynn Cruz, Khoi Dao, Brian Drummond, Richard Epcar, Caitlin Glass, Barbara Goodson, Chris Hackney, Brendan Hunter, Alessandro Juliani, David Kaye, Josh Keaton, Anthony Kresky, Christopher Khayman Lee, Comfort Love, Mega Ran, Erica Mendez, The Microphone Misfitz, Justin Nimmo, Tony Oliver, Laura Stahl, Ellyn Stern, Ciarán Strange, Kit Strange, KT Strange, Corinne Sudberg, Brad Swaile, Roger Velasco, Selwyn Jaydon Ward, and Adam Withers.
October 31–November 3, 2024	Huntington Place; Detroit, Michigan		Britt Baron, Dawn M. Bennett, John Bentley, ChibiTifa, Allegra Clark, Jason Douglas, Ricco Fajardo, Anthony Kresky, Keith Silverstein, Nienna Surion, Kirk Thornton, Natalie Van Sistine, Briana White, and Suzie Yeung.
October 30–November 2, 2025	Huntington Place; Detroit, Michigan	14,000	Autumn's Cosplay, Babybeard, Morgan Berry, Bill Butts, Clifford Chapin, Jessie James Grelle, May Hong, Melanie Jasmine, Christina Marie Kelly, Lex Lang, Alan Lee, David Matranga, Kristen McGuire, Patrick Pedraza, Chris Rager, Casey Renee, Zeno Robinson, Michelle Rojas, and Spirit Bomb.
October 29–November 1, 2026	Huntington Place; Detroit, Michigan		AllieCat, Griffin Burns, Ray Chase, The Cybertronic Spree, Robbie Daymond, Marisa Duran, Sandy Fox, Chad Hoku, Marina Inoue, Melanie Jasmine, Lex Lang, Virginia Lee, Emi Lo, Adam McArthur, Hikaru Midorikawa, NateWantsToBattle, Casey Renee, Michael Sorich, Karen Strassman, Kaiji Tang, David Vincent, Cedric Williams, and Anne Yatco.

== See also ==
- Midwest Media Expo
- Glass City Con X Midwest Media Expo
