= Fairlane Town Center =

Regional shopping mall in Dearborn, Michigan

Coordinates: 42°18′59″N 83°13′23″W

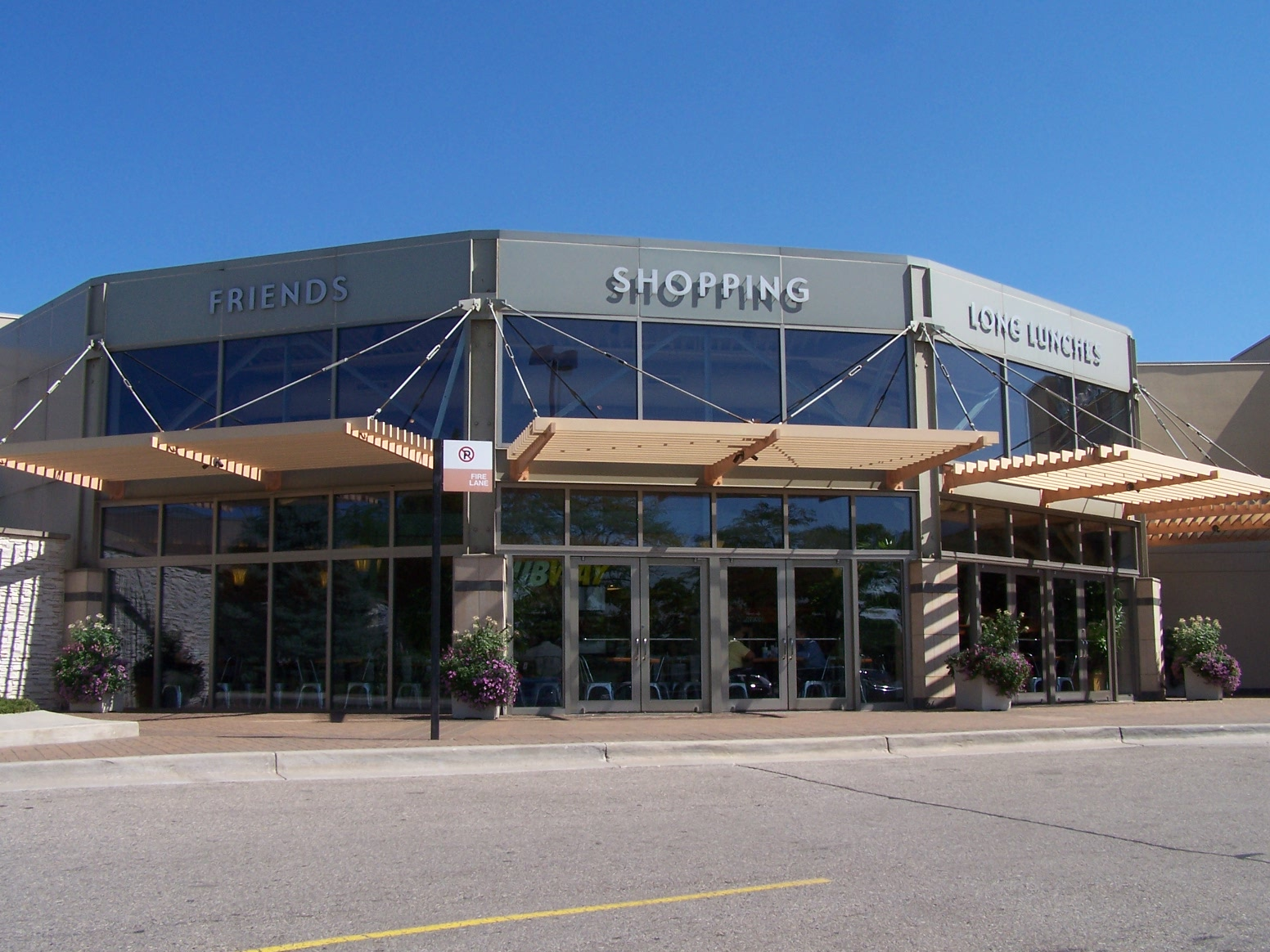
- Location: Dearborn, Michigan, U.S.
- Opened: March 1, 1976; 50 years ago
- Developer: Taubman Centers, Homart, and Ford Motor Land Development
- Manager: Kohan Retail Investment Group
- Owner: Kohan Retail Investment Group
- Num. of stores: 125
- Num. of anchor tenants: 5 (2 occupied, 3 vacant)
- Floor area: 1,400,000 sq ft (130,000 m^{2})
- Floors: 2 with partial third floor (3 in Macy's)
- Parking: 8,400 spaces
- Public transit: DDOT 2, 10, 46, 60; SMART 200, 210, 250
- Website: http://www.shopfairlane.com/

Fairlane Town Center is a super-regional shopping mall in the Detroit suburb of Dearborn, Michigan. The mall is adjacent to The Henry Hotel, The Fairlane Club, the University of Michigan–Dearborn, Henry Ford Community College, The Henry Ford, and the Ford Motor Company headquarters. The anchor stores are Macy's and JCPenney, with vacant anchor spaces last occupied by AMC Theatres, Sears, and Ford Motor Company offices.

Following a major renovation in 2007, the mall features a large food court, full-service restaurants, several eateries, and merchandise for the urbanized market. The mall is about a 15-minute drive from downtown Detroit, Wayne State University, or Metro Airport.

== History ==
Fairlane Town Center was a joint-venture between A. Alfred Taubman, Homart, and Ford Motor Land Development. Fairlane Town Center opened on March 1, 1976. The mall is one of four super-regional Taubman malls built in the Detroit metro area in the 1970s, the other three being Briarwood Mall in Ann Arbor (1973), Lakeside Mall in Sterling Heights (1976) and Twelve Oaks Mall in Novi (1977).

In 1976, the mall opened with JCPenney as the north anchor and Sears as south anchor; Hudson's opened on July 20. Additional features included an ice skating rink (on the ground floor), a 5 screen movie theater (on the second floor above the ice skating rink), as well as a unique Ford ACT elevated monorail car that shuttled shoppers between the mall and the nearby Hyatt Regency Dearborn. The monorail system ceased in 1987, and the tracks demolished in 1990.

Lord & Taylor was added March 6, 1978, along with stores at Twelve Oaks and Lakeside malls, and Saks Fifth Avenue opened in 1980.

The first Coffee Beanery opened at the mall in 1978.

In the early 1980s, the ice skating rink was removed and the space was converted to a 5 screen movie theater, operated by United Artists. (5 screens were on the ground floor, and an additional 5 screens were on the second floor.) It was closed in the late 1990s. The space was demolished to make way for a 21 screen Star Theatre multiplex which was added in 1999. Also in 1999 a Lifestyle Cafe (food court) was added. In 2006 AMC merged with Star and it became AMC Star. Saks Fifth Avenue changed its store to an Off 5th Outlet format in January 2002, solely operating on the first floor.

Hudson's adopted the Marshall Field's name in August 2001 shortly before the chain was acquired by May Company and again in 2005 by Federated Department Stores; in September 2006, the store was converted to Macy's along with all other Marshall Field's stores in Michigan. In 2004, Fairlane adopted an adult supervision policy to discourage underage loitering. Lord & Taylor closed in 2006.

In 2007, the mall completed a major three year renovation project. The mall secured H&M as an anchor tenant in 2007. The same year, Saks Fifth Avenue Off 5th closed its outlet store at the mall and was demolished in 2008 for a new wing featuring restaurants such as BRAVO!, Cucina Italiana, and P.F. Chang's China Bistro.

In 2014, Taubman Centers announced that Fairlane and six other malls (including The Mall at Partridge Creek) would be sold to the Starwood Capital Group LLC for $1.4 billion. In 2015, a DSW in the former Lord and Taylor wing relocated to a nearby shopping center. Two years later, Ford Motor Company added new offices in the former Lord & Taylor and part of the wing, accommodating more than 200,000 square feet of space, colloquially nicknamed "Ford & Taylor" by employees. The wing got blocked off in early April 2016. Later in 2017, Macy's Backstage—an off-price variant of its namesake—opened its first location in Michigan, occupying the majority of the third floor.

On May 31, 2018, it was announced that Sears would be closing as part of a plan to close 78 stores nationwide. The store closed on September 2, 2018.

In 2020, the mall, along with Stony Point Fashion Park in Richmond, Virginia, and The Shops at Willow Bend in Plano, Texas, got new ownership after Starwood defaulted on its loan. Ford closed its offices in Fairlane Town Center shortly after. AMC closed the mall's theater on November 13, 2022.

In March 2023, the mall was sold to the Kohan Retail Investment Group.

On July 3, 2026, two people were killed and another injured in what is believed to have been a targeted attack that also injured a bystander.

== Architecture ==
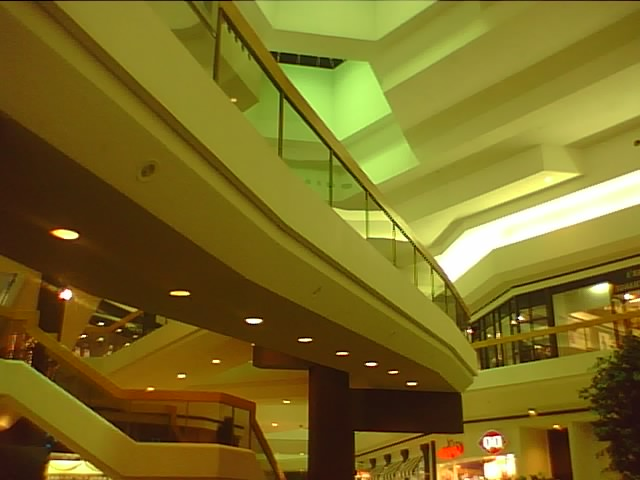
Interior.

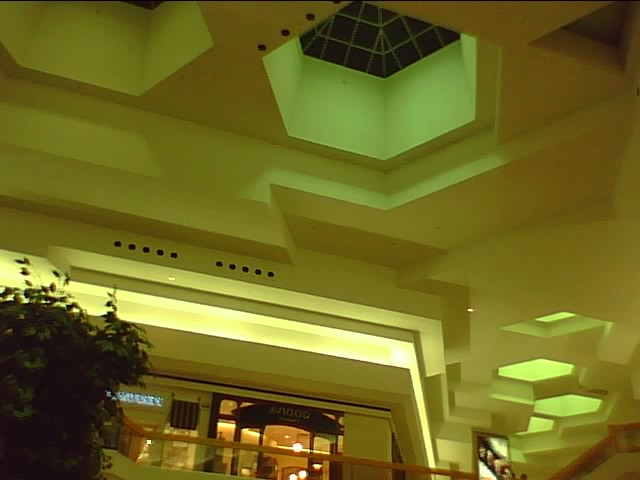
Interior.

The interior of the Fairlane Town Center is unique and innovative following the themes of other Taubman shopping centers.

The internal pedestrian network consists of two floors through most of the mall, and a third level designed into the middle of the center courts. The middle level design is perhaps one of the most unusual designs of the mall, sharing the concept with Schaumburg, Illinois' Woodfield Mall and the original Eastridge Center, in San Jose, California. One side of the center of the mall is lower, and a middle level is formed between the upper and lower levels, thus creating a three level design in the center courts while maintaining a two level design throughout the rest of the mall.

Due to the original monorail system, there are dual interior courts rather than a single grand court. The south central court was originally designed as an activity center, with a stage and seating areas, and the north central court was designed as the location of a large terraced fountain.

Each anchor court features a large sculpture and seating areas. The interior features terrazzo-tiled flooring, wood trimmed glass railings, and white walls and ceilings articulated with geometric, hexagon shaped skylights featuring three halogen lights mounted on the apex of each dome. Access among the three retail levels is provided by a complex network of stairs, ramps, escalators, and two lighted "octa-lift" elevators each located in the center of the mall.

== References and further reading ==
- Cantor, George (2005). Detroit: An Insiders Guide to Michigan. University of Michigan Press. ISBN 0-472-03092-2.
- Meyer, Katherine Mattingly and Martin C.P. McElroy with Introduction by W. Hawkins Ferry, Hon A.I.A. (1980). Detroit Architecture A.I.A. Guide Revised Edition. Wayne State University Press. ISBN 0-8143-1651-4.
- McKeever, J. Ross, Nathaniel M Griffin, Commercial and Office Development Council, Urban Land Institute, Executive Group (1977). Shopping Center Development Handbook. ULI.
