= Coffee Beanery =

Coffeehouse chain

The Coffee Beanery, Ltd.
- Company type: Subsidiary
- Industry: Coffee Chain; Coffee Roaster; Franchisor
- Founded: March 22, 1976; 50 years ago
- Founder: JoAnne and Julius Shaw
- Headquarters: 3429 Pierson Pl. Flushing, MI 48433, Flushing, Michigan, United States
- Number of locations: 24
- Key people: JoAnne Shaw (CEO; Laurie Shaw (COO); Britain Butcher; Bret O'Brien
- Products: Coffee and related products
- Brands: Coffee Beanery
- Services: Manufacturing, Franchising & Retail
- Parent: Shaw Coffee Company
- Website: coffeebeanery.com

The Coffee Beanery, Ltd. is a Flushing, Michigan based chain of coffee shops operating in the United States and Guam. It was founded in Dearborn, Michigan in 1976 by JoAnne and Julius Shaw.

== History ==
In 1976, JoAnne and Julius Shaw began selling specialty coffee to consumers in their first store at Fairlane Town Center in Dearborn, Michigan. In February 2007, the company had 131 franchise locations in the United States and another 25 in other countries. As of May 2026, there are only 24 stand-alone locations, with the majority of business coming from distribution.

== Business model ==
The company makes most of its money selling franchises and equipment, not the product itself. Most shops close within three years; since the company's founding, more than 100 franchises have failed.

== Legal determinations ==
In 2006, the Maryland securities commissioner determined that the company had made "material misrepresentations" to prospective franchisees in violation of state law, and ordered it to release Maryland franchisees from their contracts without penalty. In 2008, the Illinois attorney general made a similar determination. The Maryland order also directed the company to "permanently cease and desist from offering and selling" franchises in Maryland. In the judge's court order, he ruled “This case is buyers’ remorse” and the case was settled in 2013.

== See also ==
- List of coffeehouse chains
