= Urban Science =

Private worldwide company

Urban Science ChannelVantage
- Type: Private
- Industry: Automotive and Financial Consulting
- Founded: 1977
- Headquarters: Detroit, Michigan
- Key people: Jim Anderson, President/Founder/CEO
- Number of employees: 500+
- Website: urbanscience.com / channelvantage.com

Urban Science is a worldwide company headquartered in the Renaissance Center, Detroit, Michigan. Urban Science serves nearly every automotive OEM in over 70 countries, throughout their 15 global offices. Jim Anderson founded Urban Science in 1977, and led the company as President/CEO until 2026 when he transitioned to the advisory role of chairman after appointing Tom Longo to the role of President/CEO.

== History ==
In 1977, Cadillac wanted to identify 37,000 car buyers in Chicago on a map and the only way it could be done was manually with push pins. James A. Anderson responded to the request by pioneering an automated mapping process, invented computer generated dot mapping and founded Urban Science to deliver the solution. From that he grew a network planning process; turning the focus on how to optimize the correct number and location of retail outlets.

In 2015, the Spanish National Commission on Markets and Competition sanctioned Urban Science España, S.L.U with 70,039 euros for facilitating since 2010 a cartel of car builders and sellers in Spain controlling 91% of the market and sharing information about their sales and repair activities reducing competition among them.

== Subsidiaries ==
ChannelVantage is a wholly owned subsidiary, formed in 2001 as a strategic alliance between General Motors and Urban Science. The name ChannelVantage supposedly embodies the scope of the services they provide—marketing and distribution "Channel" management—and signifies how they help General Motors Corporation achieve its "Vantage," or as Webster's Dictionary defines it, "a position affording superior power or opportunity."
