= Sibley's Shoes =

Former Michigan retail footwear chain

- Industry: Footwear
- Founded: 1920
- Founder: Harry Rosenfeld
- Defunct: 2003
- Headquarters: Detroit, Michigan

Sibley's Shoes was a retail footwear chain founded in 1920 in the city of Detroit, Michigan, United States. It was founded by Harry Rosenfeld. His sons Aaron Ross and Norman Rosenfeld worked for the company and later took over management and ownership upon Harry's death in 1973. In 1932, the flagship store was moved to the corner of Woodward Avenue and Montcalm; by 1952, Sibley's moved its corporate offices to the Fox Building and remained there until 1977. Meanwhile, the Sibley's chain grew to more than 38 stores at its peak, throughout Michigan and into Ohio. These stores, primarily located in shopping malls, included both Sibley's and Ms. Sibley's, the latter of which was a specialty shoe store for women.

Upon the construction of the Renaissance Center skyscraper complex in the mid-1970s, Sibley's later moved its offices there, until the complex was purchased by General Motors. Sibley's later chose a site in Warren, Michigan in 1997 and began construction on a new headquarters building and warehouse, completed in August 1998.

In 2001, the company was sold to its two top executives, President and CEO Hansel Artrip and CFO/VP Andrew Belsky, and the headquarters were relocated again, this time to Grand Blanc, Michigan. After the chain's acquisition in the spring of 2001, store sales saw deep declines in 2002 and 2003. Efforts were made to develop diversification strategies to align product with younger demographics, as well as capitalize on the emerging web-based markets, but demand for their products as well as market headwinds eliminated the potential for a turn-around. The ownership group soon saw its line of credit revoked by way of Chase Bank's acquisition of Detroit-based Bank One, and mounting losses, made worse by the terrorist attacks of 9/11/2001 and the mysterious blackouts of August, 2003 forced the senior leadership team into panic mode as they teetered on the brink of insolvency. Artrip moved to negotiate a partnership with a financier to back continued operations, but in December 2003 it was determined that there was no way forward. After intense deliberation, and an unwillingness to restructure the embattled company, Artrip and Belsky announced their intent to close the last twenty-nine stores in late 2003, citing poor financial performance. The stores would close for good in April, 2004. The Sibley's Shoes name was subsequently purchased by Mr. Alan's for $25,000
