= Edward Hotel & Convention Center =

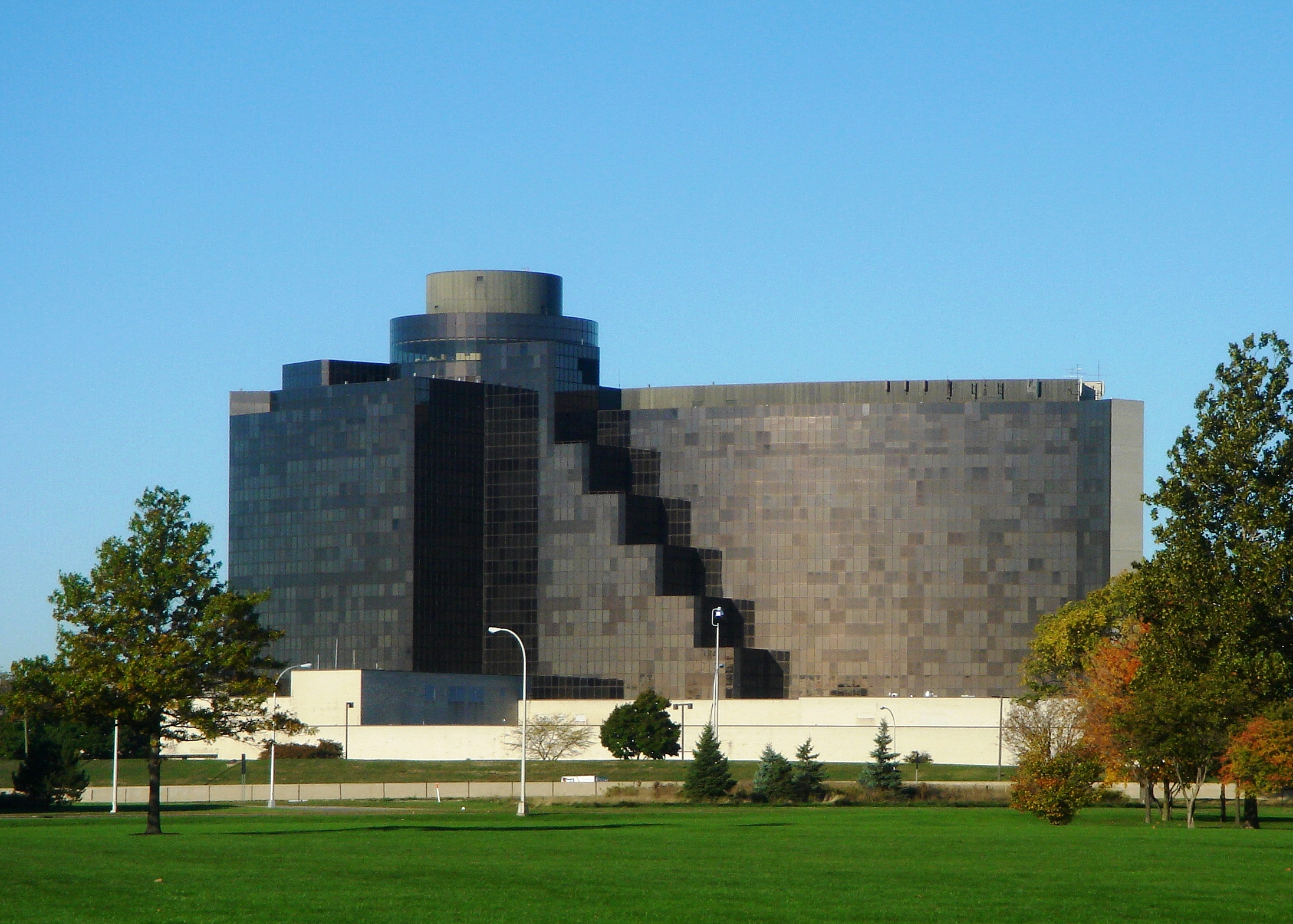
- Former names: Hyatt Regency Dearborn

General information
- Type: Hotel
- Architectural style: Modern
- Location: Dearborn, Michigan; United States
- Coordinates: 42°18′43.6″N 83°13′4.1″W
- Groundbreaking: October 1973
- Completed: 1976
- Closed: December 14, 2018

Height
- Top floor: 213 ft (65 m)

Technical details
- Floor count: 16

Design and construction
- Architect(s): Charles Luckman and Associates
- Main contractor: Del E. Webb Corporation

The Edward Hotel & Convention Center, formerly the Hyatt Regency Dearborn hotel, was a 14-story, 773-room former conference center hotel located in the Metro Detroit suburb of Dearborn, Michigan. Until its closure in 2018, it was the second largest hotel in Michigan, after the Marriott in Detroit's Renaissance Center.

== History ==
The hotel was constructed in 1976 as the Hyatt Regency Dearborn. Originally built as an upscale hotel, the building included a Ford-designed monorail people mover to Fairlane Mall. The people mover, hotel, and mall were supposed to be part of a larger office, retail, and residential complex built by Ford's land development subsidiary. The people mover was a Ford Motor Company prototype for an Automatically Controlled Transportation System and was closed in 1988, and ultimately removed.

The hotel originally had a revolving restaurant on its top floor, a helipad and featured 800 rooms when it first opened.

The high-rise hotel contains a conference center, restaurants, a retail area, and a fitness center. The architect, Charles Luckman, designed the hotel in a contemporary Modern style with glass as the main exterior material. The hotel was built by the Del E. Webb Corporation. The hotel is adjacent to Fairlane Town Center shopping mall, Ford World Headquarters, and The Henry Ford Museum and Greenfield Village.

The hotel was renamed Adoba Hotel Dearborn / Detroit on November 1, 2012, and the Royal Dearborn Hotel and Convention Center in 2015. Canadian businessman Xiao Hua Gong, also known as Edward Gong, bought the hotel for $20 million in 2016 and renamed it after himself, calling it first the Edward Village Michigan Hotel, then the Edward Hotel & Convention Center.

On December 14, 2018, the hotel was deemed "unfit for human occupancy" by the City of Dearborn and condemned and closed due to fire code violations and lack of necessary permits. The hotel was seized from Gong by US and Canadian authorities in 2021, after his business empire imploded as a result of multi-national criminal investigations in the US, Canada and New Zealand.

On September 18, 2021, the vacant structure was sold by the United States Marshals Service to an unnamed buyer. The buyer announced plans to convert the 773-room hotel to 375 apartments, while possibly retaining a small hotel portion. The buyer was later revealed to be an affiliate of New York-based firm Rhodium Capital Advisors. Construction never started, and the Rhodium affiliate defaulted on the property's mortgage, prompting a sheriff's sale in June 2024.

== See also ==
- Architecture of metropolitan Detroit
- Tourism in metropolitan Detroit
