= Renaissance Center =

Skyscrapers in Detroit, Michigan

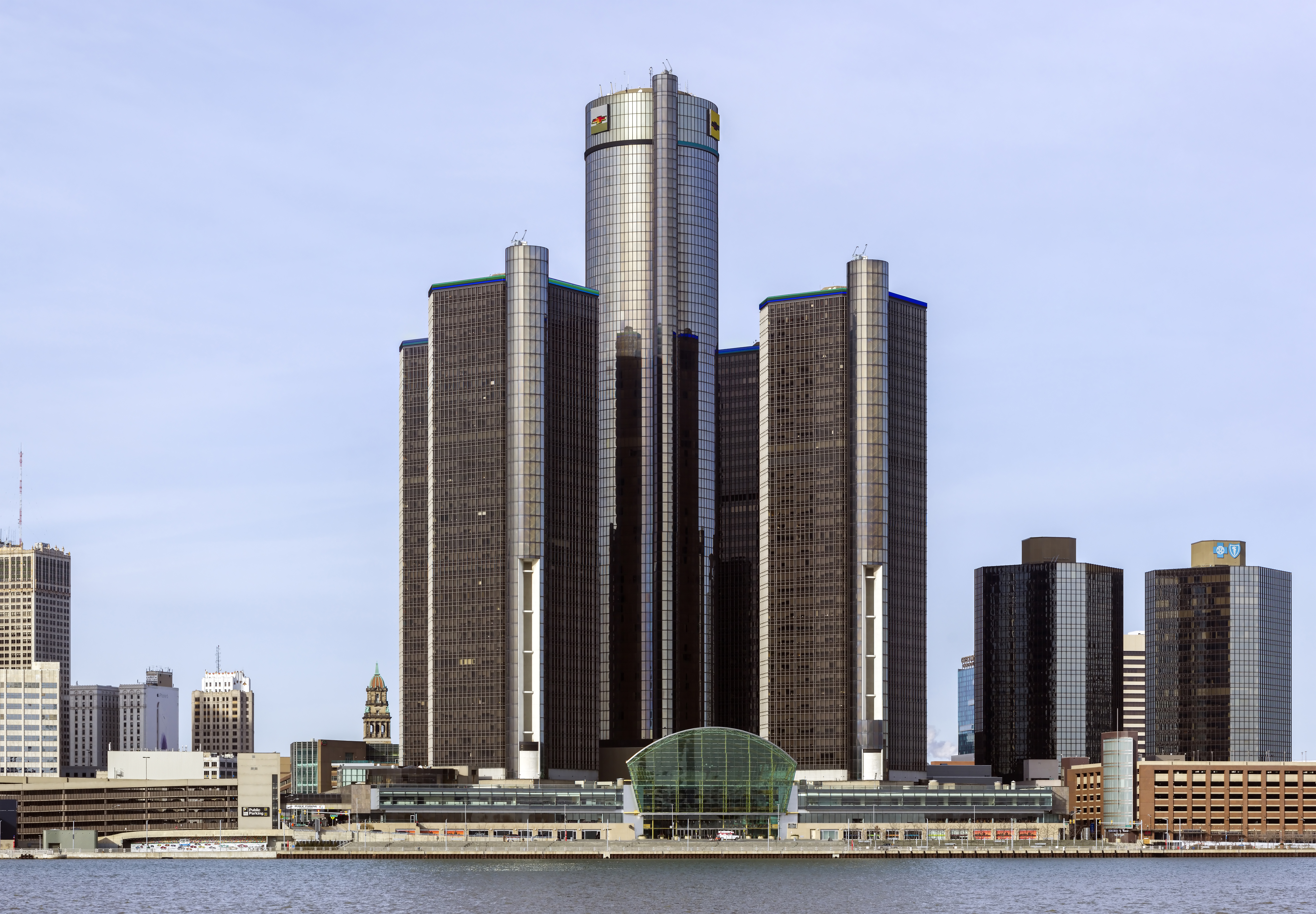
- Renaissance Center seen from Windsor in 2014
- Alternative names: GMRENCEN

General information
- Type: Hotel; Commercial offices Retail
- Architectural style: Modern; Brutalist
- Location: 400 E Jefferson Avenue; Detroit, Michigan 48243; United States
- Coordinates: 42.3289°N 83.0397°W
- Construction started: 1973
- Completed: 1977; 49 years ago 1981; 45 years ago (towers 500–600)
- Renovated: 2004
- Owner: General Motors (hotel, towers 100–400)
- Operator: CBRE Group

Height
- Antenna spire: 750 ft (230 m)
- Roof: 727 ft (222 m)
- Top floor: 697 ft (212 m)

Dimensions
- Diameter: 188 ft (57 m) (central tower)

Technical details
- Floor count: 73 (Marriott); 39 (towers 100-400); 21 (towers 500-600)
- Floor area: 5,552,000 sq ft (515,800 m^{2})

Design and construction
- Architect: John Portman & Associates
- Structural engineer: Morris E. Harrison & Associates
- Main contractor: Tishman Construction

Renovating team
- Architects: Skidmore, Owings & Merrill; Gensler; SmithGroup; Ghafari Associates
- Main contractor: Turner Construction

Other information
- Public transit: Renaissance Center; DDOT 3, 9 SMART FAST Michigan, Woodward; SMART 805, 851

Website
- gmrencen.com

Detroit Marriott at the Renaissance Center

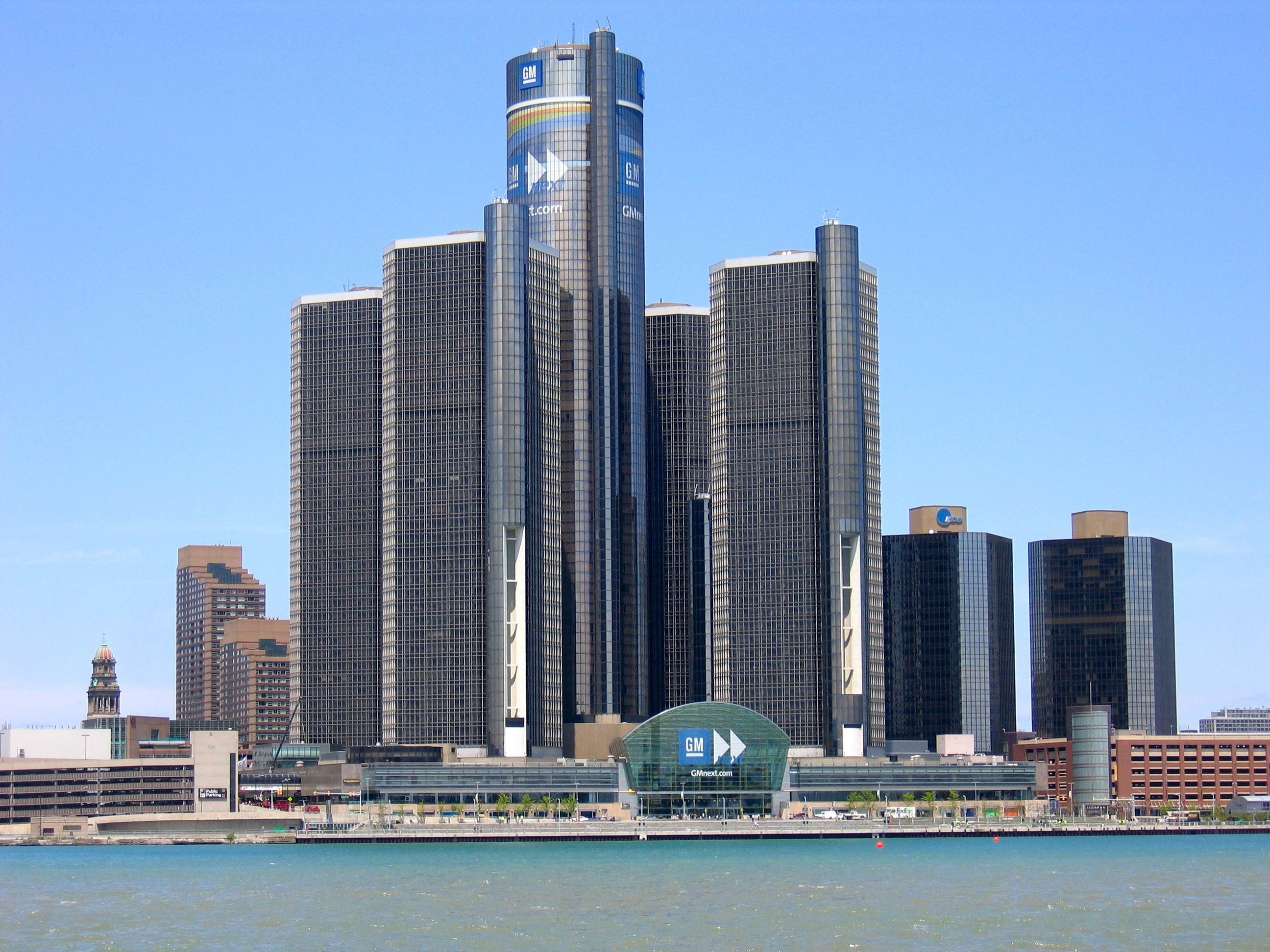
- Renaissance Center seen from Windsor in 2008
- Hotel chain: Marriott International

General information
- Location: United States, 400 Renaissance Center Drive; Detroit, Michigan
- Coordinates: 42.3289°N 83.0397°W
- Opening: 1977
- Owner: General Motors
- Operator: Marriott Hotels & Resorts

Height
- Height: 727 ft (222 m)

Technical details
- Floor count: 73
- Floor area: Meeting space: 100,000 sq ft (9,300 m^{2})

Other information
- Number of rooms: 1,246
- Number of suites: 52
- Parking: Valet and self

Website
- www.marriott.com/dtwdt

The Renaissance Center, commonly known as the RenCen, (Note: Sometimes known as the General Motors Renaissance Center, and officially branded as the GMRENCEN from 2015 until 2026.) is a landmark mixed-use building complex in downtown Detroit, Michigan, United States. Located on the Detroit International Riverfront, the complex consists of seven connected towers, including a 74-story Marriott hotel, (Note: Despite the center's name, the hotel is not affiliated with the Renaissance Hotels chain, also owned by Marriott.) and the tallest building in Michigan at its center. Four shorter office skyscrapers surround the hotel, with two shorter, auxiliary office towers to the east. The towers are connected by a large square podium containing extensive public spaces, a conference center, and retail stores.

Developed as an urban renewal project in the 1970s, the Renaissance Center was envisioned as a "city-within-a-city," and was meant to anchor a wider redevelopment of the then-declining city of Detroit. The project was developed and funded by a consortium led by the Ford Motor Company, and John Portman served as its principal architect. The five tallest towers were built in the Modern architectural style and completed in stages from 1976 to 1977, with the two shorter towers added later in 1981.

At the time of its completion, the Renaissance Center was the largest private development in the history of the United States, and the central tower was the world's tallest hotel. General Motors purchased the complex in 1996 for use as its global headquarters, formerly, and extensively renovated it in the early 2000s, modernizing its Brutalist interior and adding a glass retail atrium and public plaza on the riverfront.

The RenCen is a distinctive feature of Detroit's skyline, and is widely considered a landmark and cultural icon of the city. With 5,552,000 square feet (515,800 m^{2}) of floor space, it is one of the largest commercial complexes in the world, though its occupancy has declined significantly since the COVID-19 pandemic. General Motors relocated its headquarters away from the Renaissance Center in early 2026, and it is planned to be partially demolished and subsequently redeveloped.

== History ==
=== Development and early years ===
The idea was conceived by Henry Ford II, then-chairman of the Ford Motor Company. In 1970, to bring his idea to life, Ford teamed up with other business leaders to form the Detroit Renaissance. This was a private non-profit development organization which Ford headed in order to stimulate building activity and revitalize the economy of Detroit. Henry Ford II sold the concept of the RenCen to the City and community leaders. Detroit Mayor Roman Gribbs touted the project as the anchor of a bridge to bridge walkway, and a complete rebuilding from bridge to bridge, referring to the area between the Ambassador Bridge, that connects Detroit to Windsor, Ontario, and the MacArthur Bridge, which connects the city with Belle Isle Park.

The Detroit Renaissance announced the first phase of construction in 1971, receiving primary financing led by the Ford Motor Company. It soon became the world's largest private development with an anticipated 1971 cost of $500 million. The principal architect was John Portman, the architect behind the Westin Peachtree Plaza Hotel and the Peachtree Center in Atlanta; the Embarcadero Center in San Francisco; and the Bonaventure Hotel in Los Angeles.

The city within a city arose. The first phase of Renaissance Center opened on July 1, 1976. For phase I, the facade of the first five towers was covered with 2,000,000 square feet (186,000 m^{2}) of glass, and used about 400,000 cubic yards (310,000 m^{3}) of concrete. This did not include the additional glass used for the atriums. It also cost $337 million to construct, employing 7,000 workers. The heating and cooling systems for the buildings were housed in two-story concrete berms facing Jefferson Avenue. Other phases that included residences, additional office and retail space were never constructed.

When the Renaissance Center opened, the cylindrical central tower was originally the flagship of Westin Hotels. The top three floors of the hotel hosted an upscale restaurant, The Summit, that rotated to allow a 360 degree view. The shopping center in the podium originally housed high-end boutiques, but now contains a greater complement of restaurants in the retail mix.

In 1977, managed by Western International Hotels, the central hotel tower of the Renaissance Center opened as the Detroit Plaza Hotel. It became the world's tallest all-hotel skyscraper surpassing its architectural twin, the Westin Peachtree Plaza Hotel in Atlanta. Its opening ended the Penobscot Building's 49-year reign as the tallest building in Michigan. The hotel was later renamed The Westin Hotel Renaissance Center Detroit. In 1986, it was surpassed in height by The Westin Stamford in Singapore. Since, the Renaissance Center's central tower has held the distinction as the tallest all-hotel skyscraper in the Western Hemisphere.

On April 15, 1977, Henry Ford II and Detroit mayor Coleman Young unveiled a plaque commemorating the private investors whose funds made the project possible. Later that evening, 650 business and society leaders attended a benefit to celebrate the Renaissance Center's formal dedication. The money raised from the $300-per-couple tickets went to the Detroit Symphony Orchestra.

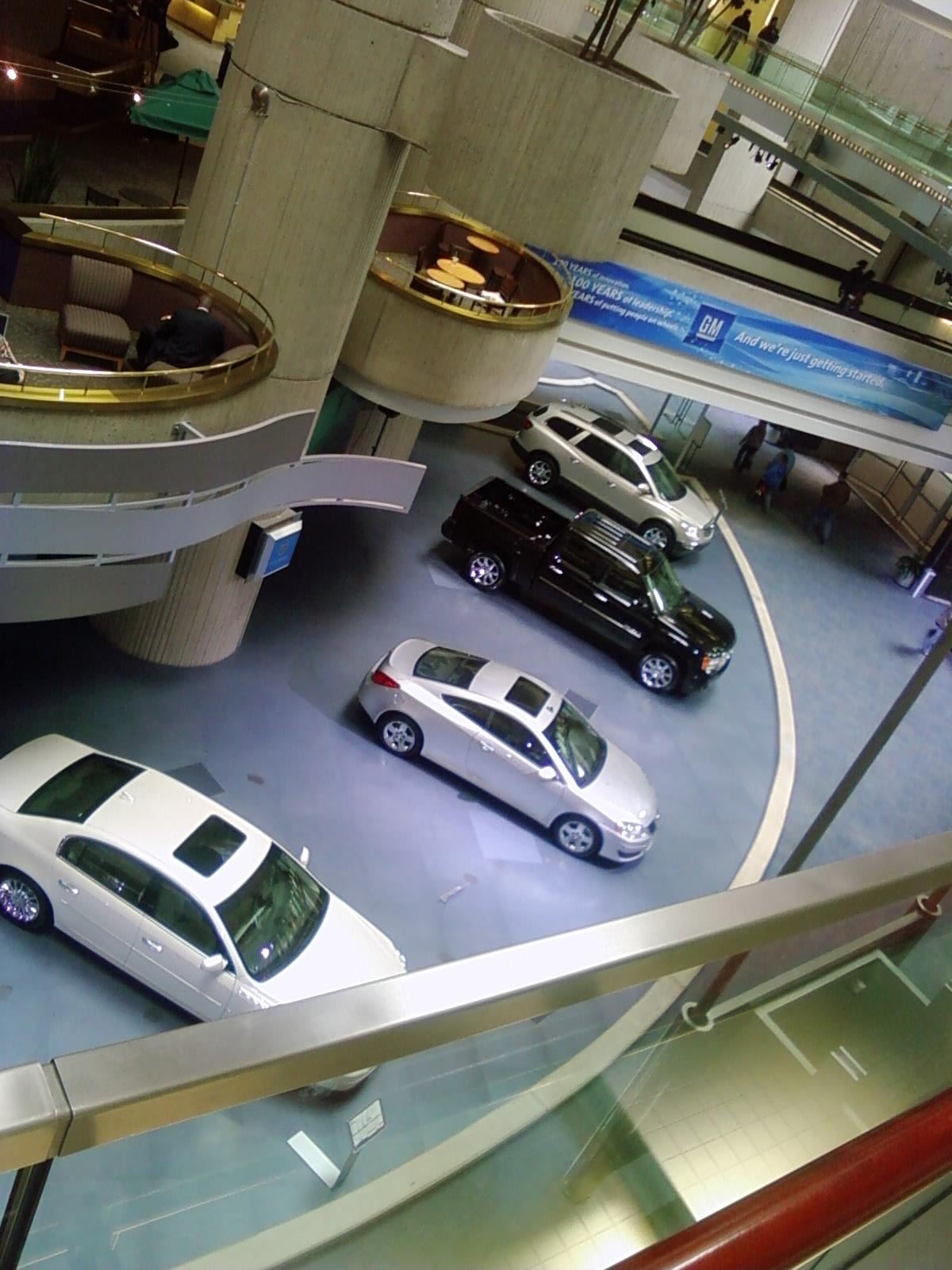
GM World exhibit inside the Renaissance Center in 2009

During the 1980 Republican National Convention, hosted at nearby Joe Louis Arena, presidential nominee Ronald Reagan and former President Gerald Ford both stayed at the Renaissance Center.

In 1987, the elevated Detroit People Mover transit line began operation with a stop at the Renaissance Center.

=== General Motors ownership ===
In May 1996, General Motors purchased the complex. GM moved its world headquarters from what is now the historic Cadillac Place state office complex in the New Center district, to the Renaissance Center, in downtown Detroit. Meanwhile, Ford Motor Company maintained offices in one of the towers in the center. Before the acquisition, Sibley's Shoes had its headquarters in the center.

In December 2001, General Motors unveiled the Wintergarden retail atrium. Designed by Skidmore, Owings & Merrill, it rises 103 feet (31 m) tall at its highest point opening direct access to the International Riverfront. In addition, the atrium contains 150,000 square feet (14,000 m^{2}) of retail space and 40,000 square feet (3,700 m^{2}) of contiguous main floor exhibit space which was used by the media during Super Bowl XL.

The $500 million renovation of the Renaissance Center completed in 2003 has helped improve Detroit's economy. Together, GM's renovation of the Renaissance Center and the Detroit Riverwalk exceeded $1 billion; the project constituted a substantial investment in downtown. More than 10,000 people (of whom 6,000 are GM employees) work in the complex. Nearly 2,000 state workers now occupy GM's former office building, the restored Cadillac Place, in the historic New Center district.

Architects' initial design for the Renaissance Center focused on creating secure interior spaces, while its design later expanded and improved to connect with the exterior spaces and waterfront through a reconfigured interior, open glass entryways, and a winter garden. By 2004, GM completed an extensive $500 million renovation of the Renaissance Center. This included a $100 million makeover for the hotel. Among GM's first actions was to remove the concrete berms facing Jefferson Avenue. The renovation includes a lighted glass walkway which encircles the interior mezzanine for ease of navigation, while the addition of the winter garden provides riverfront access and a view of Canada. A covered skyway over Jefferson Avenue connects to the Millender Center, Courtyard by Marriott - Downtown Detroit, and Coleman A. Young Municipal Center.

The Wintergarden added to the Renaissance Center faces the Riverfront and provides panoramic views of the Windsor skyline. The complex connects offices, the hotel, retail specialty shops, restaurants, a jazz club, and a movie theater. The theater has since closed and been converted to offices. A pedestrian-friendly glass entryway has replaced the former concrete berms along Jefferson Avenue. The redevelopment provides the GM World display of vehicles, a restored hotel, a renovated rooftop restaurant, and the addition of GM's corporate logo to crown the top of the building. Construction of the lighted glass walkway facilitates ease of navigation encircling the interior mezzanine. Hines completed redevelopment of Towers 500 and 600 for GM in 2004.

The Riverfront Promenade was dedicated on December 17, 2004, and helped to usher in a return to recreational uses along Detroit's International Riverfront. GM played a key role in the transformation of the east riverfront with a donation of $135 million to the Detroit Riverfront Conservancy for the development of a world class riverfront promenade planned at $559 million, which included $50 million from the Kresge foundation. In 2011, the Detroit Wayne County Port Authority opened its new state of the art cruise ship dock and passenger terminal on Hart Plaza, adjacent to the Renaissance Center. Port authority bonds financed another 1,500 space parking garage adjacent to the Renaissance Center. Further upriver, the Roberts Riverwalk Hotel faces the east riverfront. In addition to the gradual continuation of the riverfront promenade, other planned projects complementing the Renaissance Center continue along the International Riverfont which include development of luxury condominiums, a cruise ship passenger terminal, retail, and entertainment venues.

In 2011, the Renaissance Center added colored LED lighting on the top of its towers (Towers 500 and 600 utilize traditional blue floodlights to illuminate their top floors). General Motors added a large illuminated LED corporate logo which also displays GM divisions. The animated logo and illuminated LED color bands around the towers can be used to support special events and may be seen from Comerica Park, home of the Detroit Tigers. The renovation of TCF Center convention and exhibit facility incorporates similar blue neon lighting along riverfront promenade.

In July 2010, Blue Cross Blue Shield of Michigan announced plans to lease 435,245 square feet (40,435.6 m^{2}) of Tower 500 and Tower 600 and relocate 3,000 of its employees from its building in Southfield, Michigan.

In January 2015, General Motors announced its intent to renovate much of the complex to make it more inviting as a destination for visitors to Detroit. That July, the complex was re-branded as "The GMRENCEN, and" Its logo was modernized and "Reflecting a New Detroit" was introduced as the new tagline. A photo-journalistic advertising campaign launched to "shine a spotlight on the people in Detroit who make remarkable contributions" to the city.

The hotel in the central tower is managed by the Marriott hotel chain and is called the Detroit Marriott at the Renaissance Center. The 1,298-room hotel is one of the largest operated by Marriott. The rooftop restaurant (which previously had revolved) received a $10 million renovation and was operated by The Epicurean Groups's Coach Insignia and closed in 2017.). It served Coach wines, a product of the Fisher family whose legacy includes Fisher Body, a name which is part of GM history.

The Renaissance Center's renovation provides for the prospect of continued development and restorations throughout the city. Architectural critics have touted the city's architecture as among North America's finest.

In its first year of operation it generated over $1 billion in economic growth for the downtown.

=== General Motors exit and redevelopment ===
On April 15, 2024, GM announced its intention to move its headquarters from the Renaissance Center to the under-construction Hudson's Detroit in 2025. GM publicly committed to redeveloping the RenCen, but their planned exit sparked public speculation that it could be demolished, a possibility which CEO Mary Barra declined to rule out. GM retained Bedrock Detroit, the real estate firm developing Hudson's Detroit, to consult on the redevelopment.

GM and Bedrock revealed a conceptual plan for the RenCen's redevelopment in November 2024. The plan calls for the demolition of two of the RenCen's office towers, 300 and 400, and most of the existing public and retail spaces at its base. Under this plan, one of the remaining office towers would be converted to rental apartments; the central tower would remain a hotel, but its upper floors would also be converted to rental apartments.

The two companies stated that they planned to fund the majority of the $1.6 billion redevelopment, but they expect $250 million in subsidies from the state of Michigan, and $100 million in tax-increment financing from the Detroit Downtown Development Authority. The companies' demand for taxpayer funding of the project was met with public opposition by many state lawmakers, including Matt Hall, then speaker-elect of the Michigan House of Representatives. In response, General Motors later stated that if lawmakers did not provide taxpayer funding, they would demolish the entire RenCen at their own expense, a proposal described by the Detroit Free Press as "likely... the largest voluntary skyscraper demolition in world history." Opponents of the demolition likened the proposal to extortion.

In 2025, GM began to buy out tenants' leases and empty the RenCen; by that November, only 18 office and retail tenants remained in the complex. Media likened the complex to a ghost town, and a GM executive compared it to a dead mall. Burger King, the last tenant in the RenCen's food court, closed November 26. The U.S. Post Office reportedly closed on January 20, 2026.

GM began to move its offices from the RenCen to Hudson's Detroit on January 12, 2026. At that time, GM closed the RenCen's public spaces, with no public announcement. As of May 2026, access to the building is restricted to office tenants, hotel and restaurant guests, and authorized visitors. It was reopened to the public during the 2026 Detroit Grand Prix from May 29–31, 2026.

Bedrock's CEO stated that demolition of the podium and towers 300 and 400, and subsequent construction on the redevelopment, is planned to begin in April 2027.

== Location ==
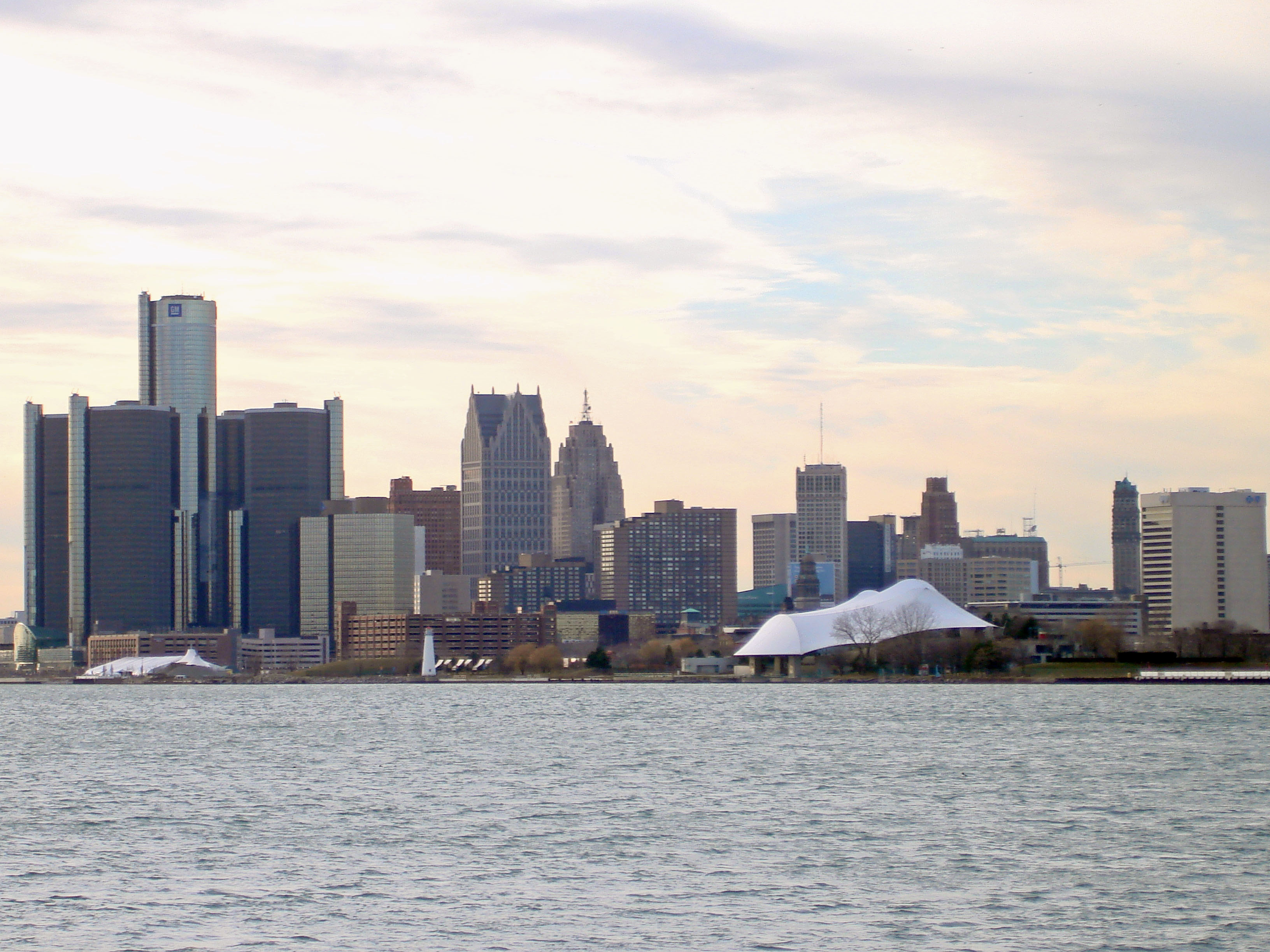
A view of the Detroit International Riverfront from Belle Isle

The Renaissance Center is a riverfront property located along the Detroit River. Approximately one-mile north of the center are Comerica Park and Ford Field, the respective venues for the Detroit Tigers and Detroit Lions. The US portal of the Detroit-Windsor Tunnel emerges adjacent to the western boundary of the Renaissance Center. The Renaissance Center is also a station on the Detroit People Mover. Additionally a pedestrian skyway, over Jefferson Avenue, connects the complex to the Millender Center. Several blocks to the west of the Renaissance Center, along Jefferson Avenue, there are the Coleman A. Young Municipal Center, Hart Plaza, Huntington Place (formerly Cobo Center, home to events such as the North American International Auto Show and Youmacon) and the Joe Louis Arena (former home of the Detroit Red Wings). The University of Detroit Mercy School of Law is located just across Jefferson Avenue. The Renaissance Center's modernist architecture balances the city's panoramic waterfront skyline, a frequent feature in photography taken from Windsor, Ontario, across the river. From the top of Renaissance Center's previous Coach Insignia restaurant (closed in 2017), patrons were able to peer down upon the neo-gothic spires of the One Detroit Center and the city's Financial District skyscrapers and stadiums. The view from the top extended for 30 miles (48 km) in all directions.

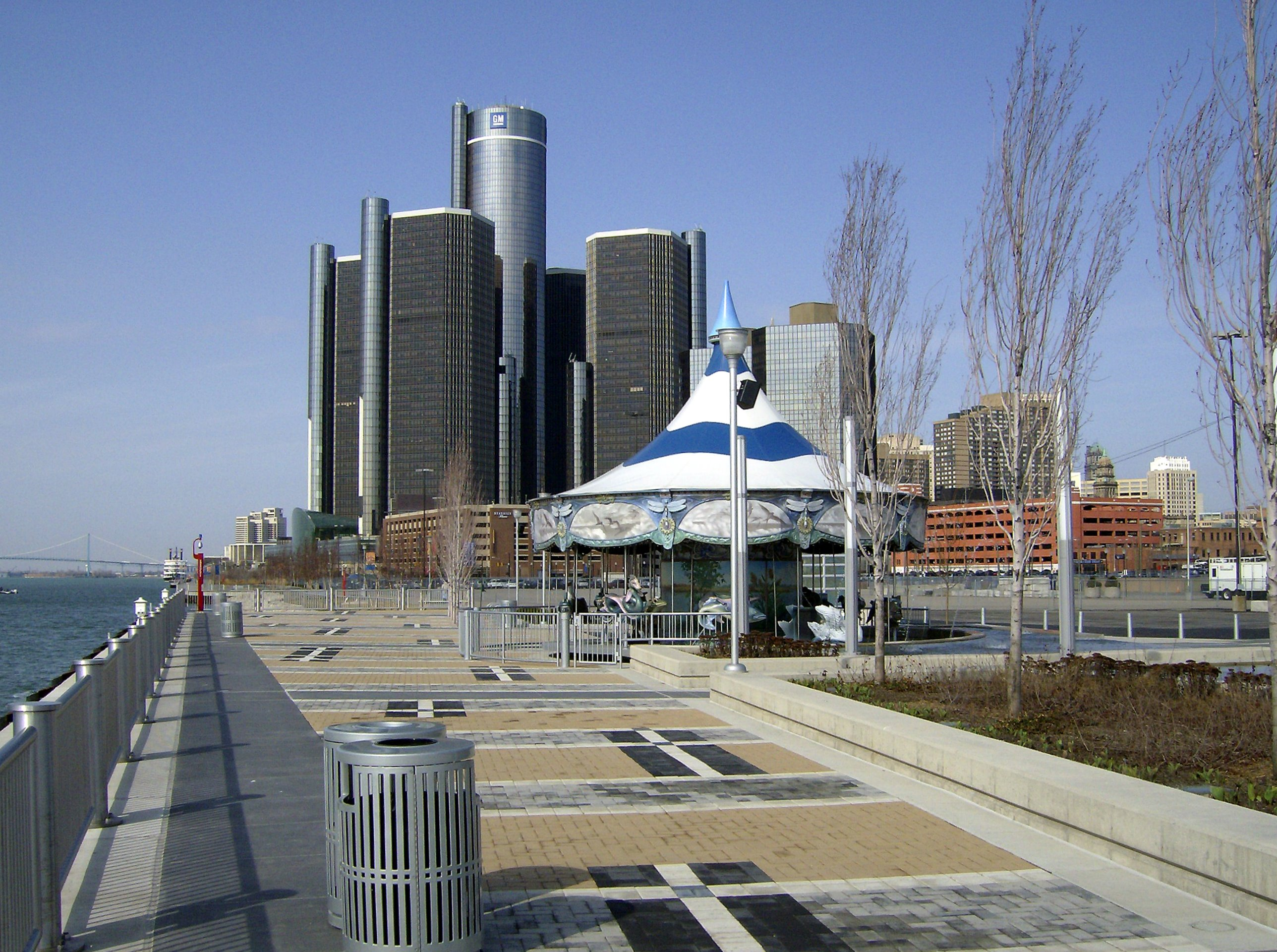
International Riverfront and Rivard Plaza merry-go-round

The Renaissance Center grounds constitute ZIP code 48243.

== Architecture ==
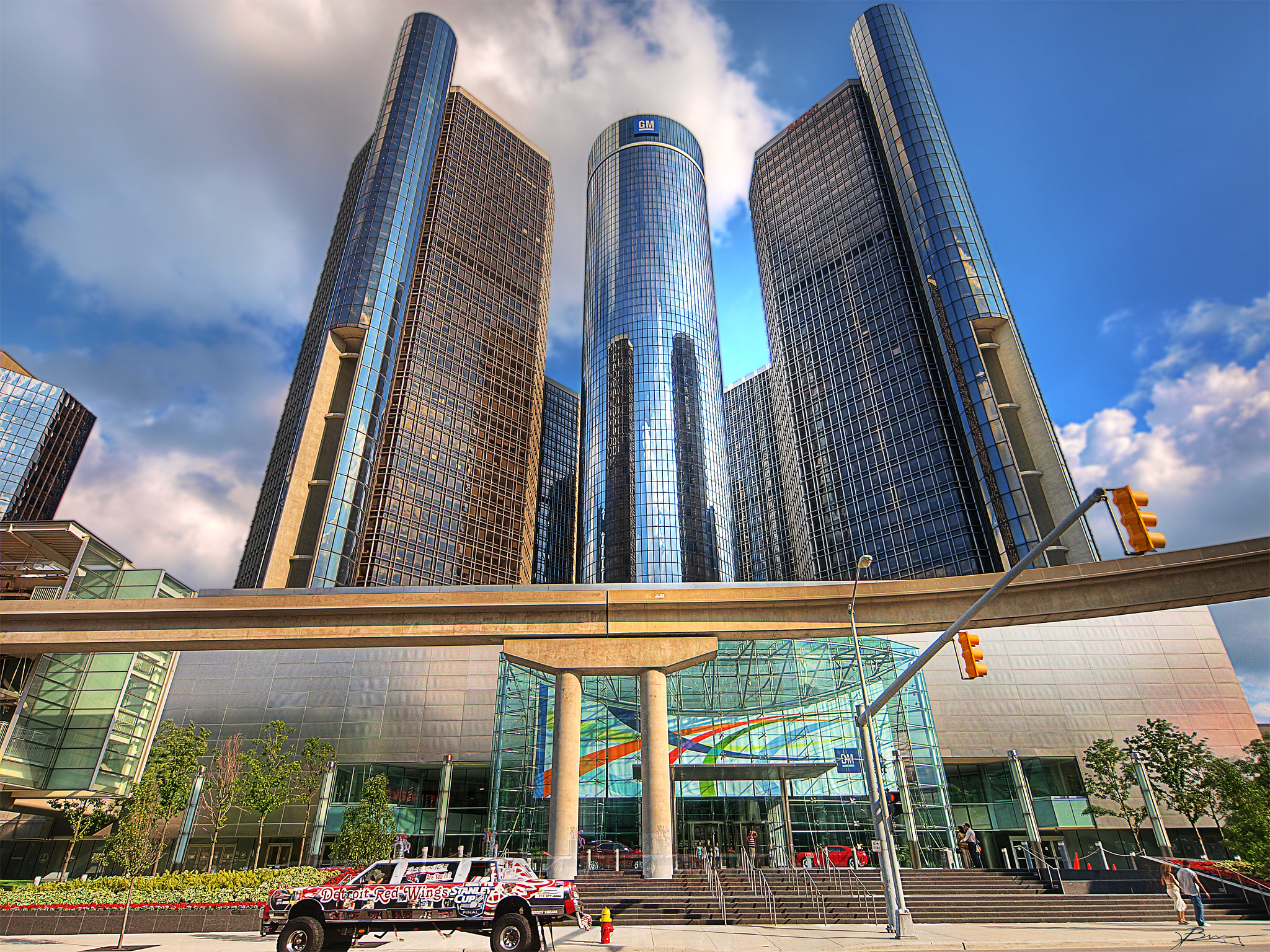
Renaissance Center from Jefferson Avenue

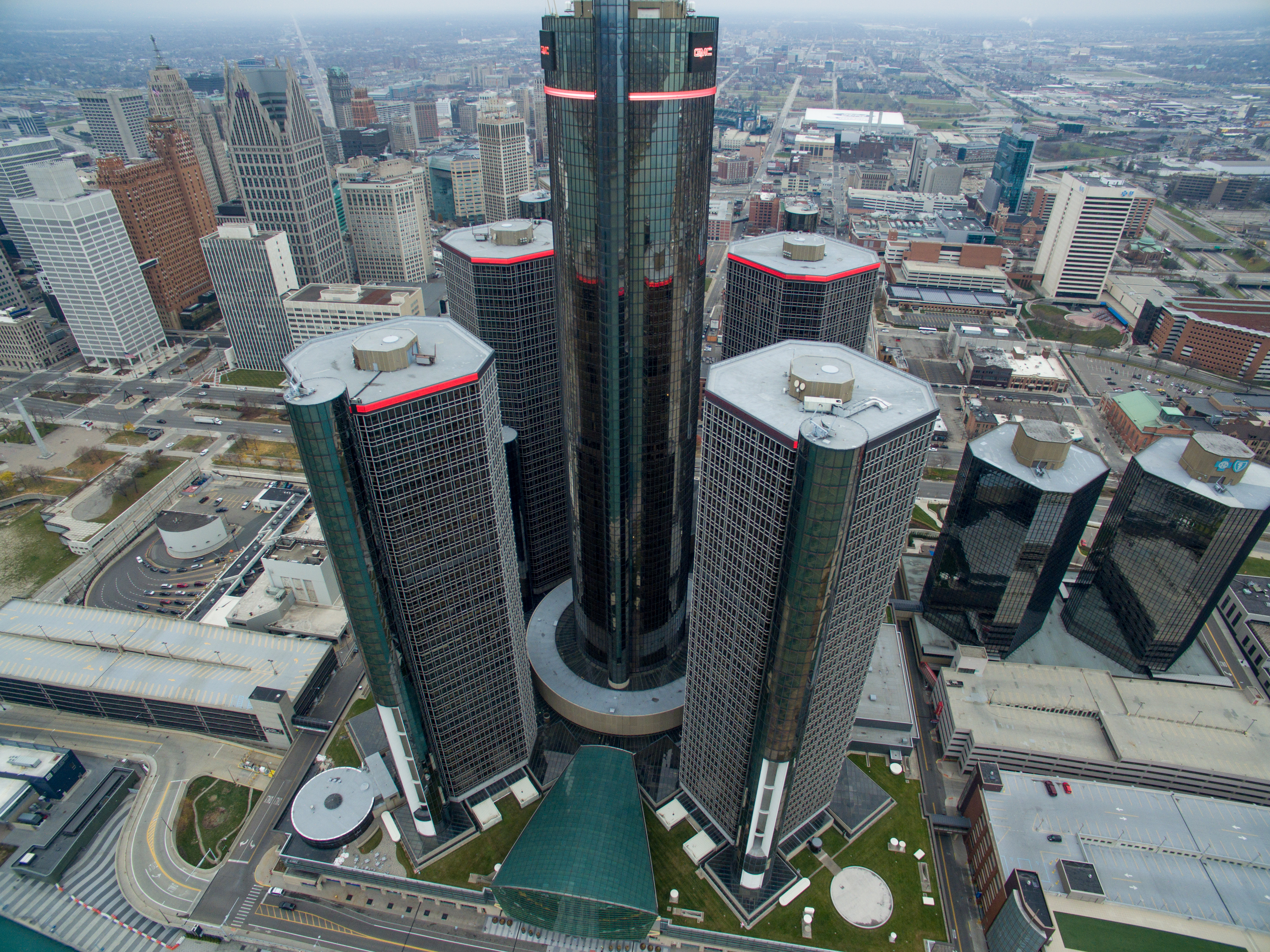
Aerial view of the towers

The centerpiece is the 73-story 727-foot (221.5 m) luxury hotel with 1,246 rooms and 52 suites (1298 total guest rooms). Its height is measured from its main Wintergarden entrance on Atwater Street which faces the International Riverfront where the complex measures 14 feet (4.3 m) taller. Entirely owned by General Motors, the complex has 5,552,000 square feet (515,800 m^{2}) of space. The main Renaissance Center complex rises from a 14-acre (5.7 ha) site. The complex is designed in the modern architectural style with glass as a main material.

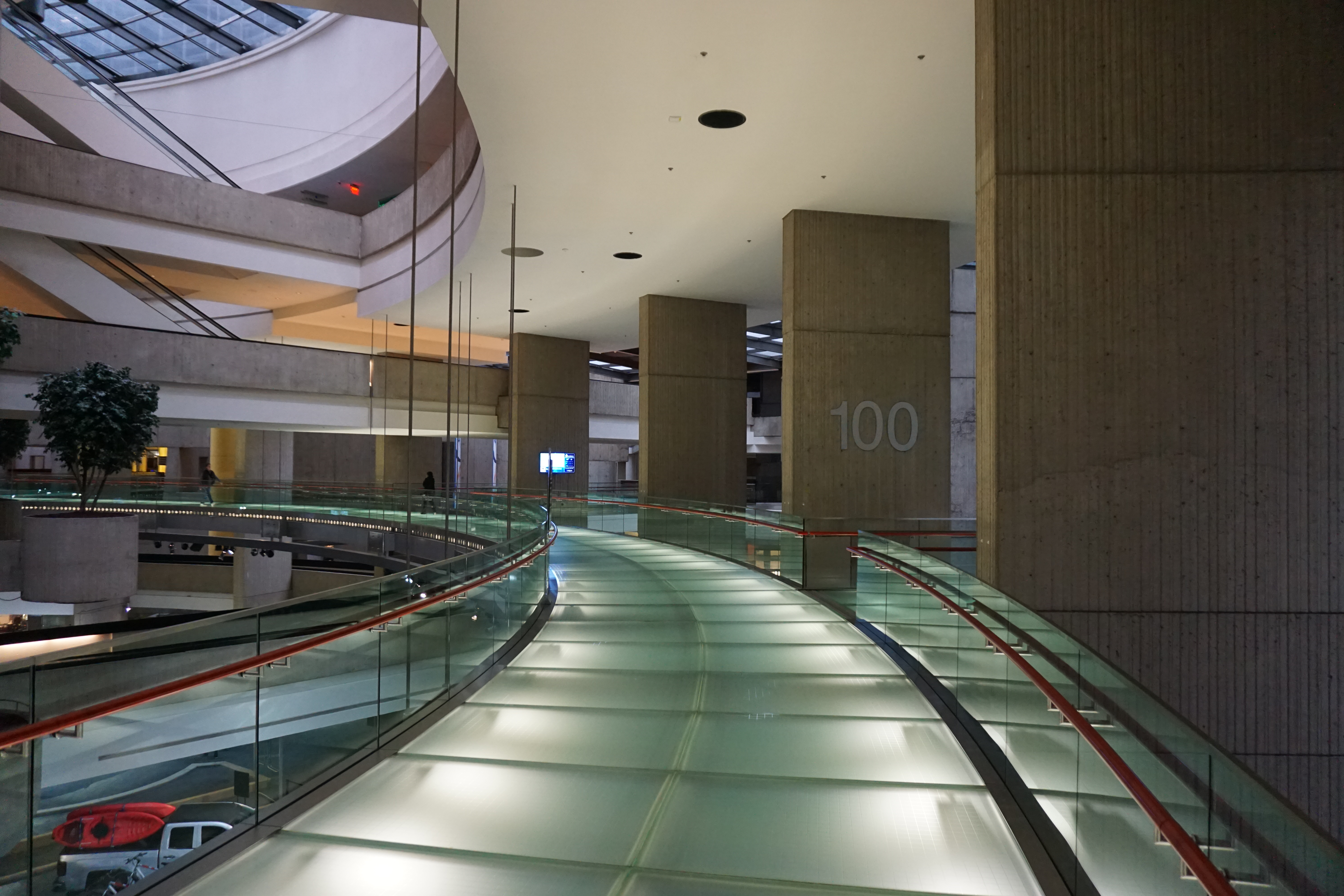
Circulation Ring of Renaissance Center

Famous for its cylindrical design, the central hotel tower's diameter is 188 feet (57 m). A lighted glass walkway radiates the mezzanine level and encircles the base of cylindrical hotel tower for ease of navigation. This ringed glass walkway is about 12 feet (3.7 m) wide and has a circumference of approximately 660 feet (200 m) or about one-eighth of a mile around. The ringed walkway's diameter is approximately 210 feet (64 m). It links to several other walkways in the complex. The five-story Wintergarden atrium leads into the central area which has an eight-story atrium lobby with rounded concrete balconies and terraces. The Highlands is located on Floors 71 through 73, which includes a restaurant, scotch bar, and special events space. The hotel has no floors labeled 7, 8, or 13. The hotel features a major conference center with 100,000 square feet (9,300 m^{2}) of meeting space including a Renaissance Ballroom for up to 2,200 guests with 26,000 square feet (2,400 m^{2}) for events, one of the largest in the United States.

John Portman designed the five-building rosette with interior spaces. In 1977, its central tower opened as the tallest hotel in the world. It remains the tallest all hotel skyscraper in the Western Hemisphere. The smaller cylinders on sides of all the towers house the elevators. The four surrounding 39-story office towers (100–400) each reach 522 feet (159 m) and have a total of 2,200,000 square feet (204,400 m^{2}) of space. Each 39-story tower has a base five-story podium structure with 165,000 square feet (15,300 m^{2}) for retail space for a total of 660,000 square feet (61,000 m^{2}). A portion of the central atrium area housed GM World, a showcase for GM vehicles. Two 21-story towers (500–600), designed by Portman and constructed in 1981, reach 339 feet (103 m). GM gained control of Towers 500 and 600 in 2001. Tower 500 has 307,300 square feet (28,550 m^{2}) of office space and an additional 14,485 square feet (1,350 m^{2}) of retail space. Tower 600 has 304,200 square feet (28,260 m^{2}) of office space and an additional 35,730 square feet (3,320 m^{2}) of retail space.

Towers 100 and 200 front Jefferson Avenue. Towers 300 and 400 are on the main Wintergarden/Atwater Street entrance facing the Riverfront. The GM Renaissance Conference Center is located on the second floor of tower 300.

The internal design is consistent with the themes of Brutalist architecture, especially in the heavy massing of concrete on the lower floors, but the 2001 renovation has softened those features.

The "city within a city" concept was duplicated in the suburb of Southfield, when the Southfield Town Center office complex - with five inter-connected golden skyscrapers and an overall area of 2,200,000 square feet (200,000 m^{2}) - was constructed from 1975 to 1989. In the ensuing years, the Renaissance Center would face competition from the growing suburban office market.

=== Renovation ===
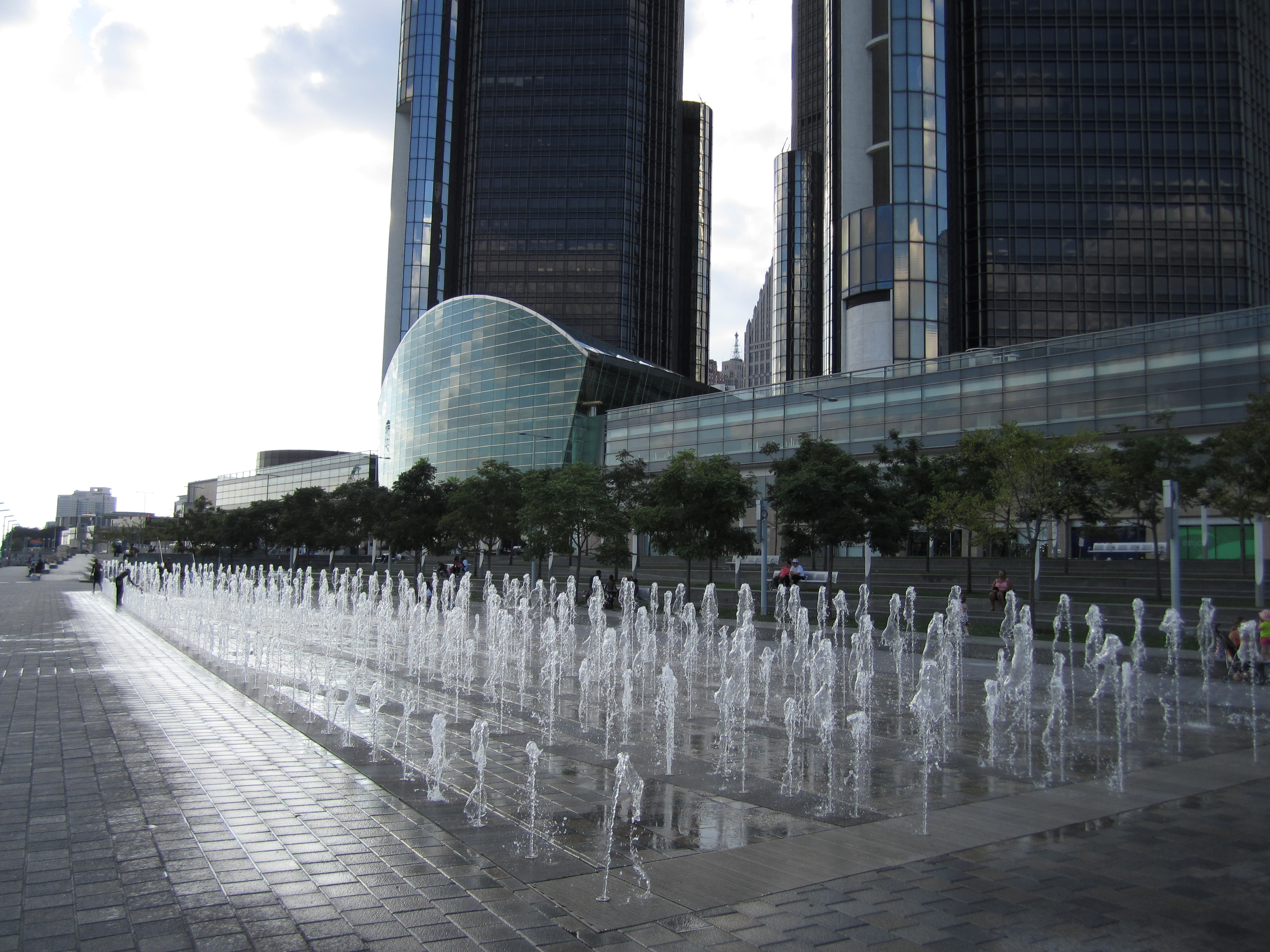
GM Plaza and Promenade at the Renaissance Center along the International Riverfront

The redevelopment project included the work of many different architects including Skidmore, Owings & Merrill of Chicago, SmithGroup of Detroit, and Ghafari Associates of Dearborn who did the renovation of the office towers. The majority of the construction operations were led by Turner Construction Company. The structural glass and steel for the Wintergarden, the entrance lobby as well as the mezzanine glass walkway were contributed by Mero. The cost of the renovation does not include the cost for reconfiguring the streets around the Renaissance Center or the cost of the park along the International Riverfront.

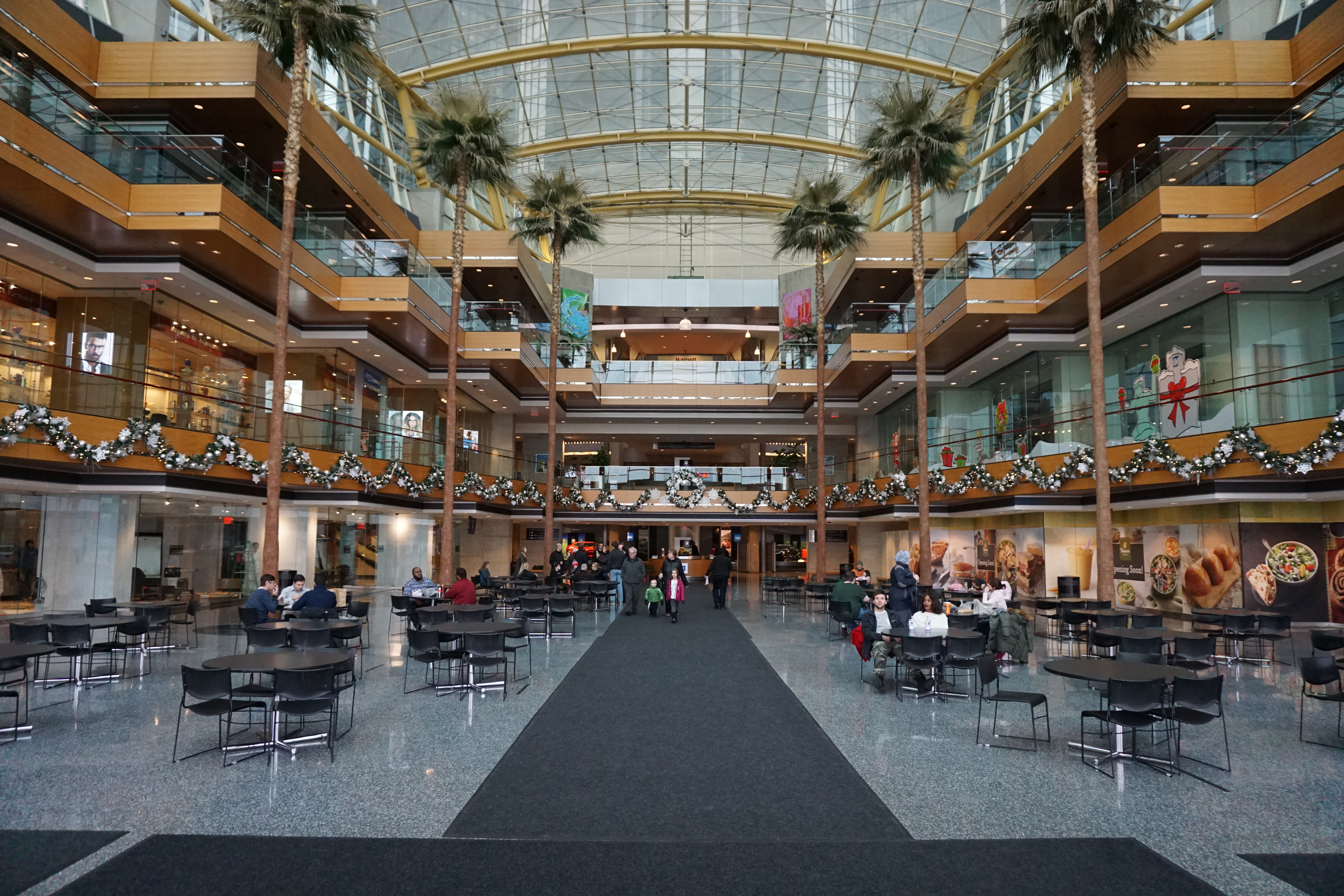
The Wintergarden was added to the Renaissance Center in 2001, along with retail shops and restaurants.

=== Technical details and tenants ===
Renaissance Center structures, with selected dimensions and tenants
Building	Year	Stories	Height feet (m)	Area sq. feet (m^{2})	Principal tenant(s)
Central Tower	1977	73	727 (221.5)	1,812,000 (168,300) est.	Detroit Marriott at the Renaissance Center; Highlands. Previous tenants included The Summit Restaurant (including a revolving top floor), which was later replaced by Coach Insignia restaurant, which closed in 2017
Tower 100 (Southwest)	1977	39	522 (159)	550,000 (51,100)	General Motors; HP Enterprise Services; United States Post Office
Tower 200 (Northwest)	1977	39	522 (159)	550,000 (51,100)	Ally Financial Headquarters; Deloitte
Tower 300 (Northeast)	1977	39	522 (159)	550,000 (51,100)	General Motors; The Renaissance Conference Center on level 2 contains 20,000 sq ft (1,900 m^{2}) of meeting space.
Tower 400 (Southeast)	1977	39	522 (159)	550,000 (51,100)	General Motors; OnStar; CBRE; Consulate-General of Japan, Detroit; Consulate of Italy in Detroit; Urban Science
Podium beneath Towers 100–400	1977	5	103 (31.39)	660,000 (61,300)	GM Showroom; Food Court; Exhibit space and retail
Tower 500 (River East Center)	1981	21	339 (103)	320,000 (29,700)	Blue Cross Blue Shield of Michigan. Includes 14,845 sq ft (1,380 m^{2}) of retail space.
Tower 600 (River East Center)	1981	21	339 (103)	340,000 (31,600)	Blue Cross Blue Shield of Michigan; Consulate-General of Canada.; Includes 35,730 sq ft (3,320 m^{2}) of retail space.
Wintergarden & Restaurants	2001	5	103 (31.39)	150,000 (14,000)	Andiamo; Panera Bread
Wintergarden atrium	2001	5	103 (31.39)	40,000 (3,700)	Main entry and exhibit space
Renaissance Center total				5,552,000 (515,800)	Owner of complex: General Motors; Property management firm: CBRE

In June 2015 the Ren Cen 4 Theatres theater complex announced that it was closing. With the end of Ren Cen 4, the city of Detroit has one first-run theater remaining, along with three independent theaters.

In July 2007 portions of Asian Village, a development of restaurants in Suite 2653 in the GM Center (200 Renaissance Center) with Asian cuisine offered, opened. The center was designed to evoke street food stalls within East and Southeast Asia.

== Security ==
Until 2024, the Renaissance Center was patrolled by the Renaissance Center Security Police, a private police force granted limited police powers by state law. Most of its officers carried firearms and were empowered to make misdemeanor arrests on Renaissance Center property. Security Police officers were employed by Securitas from 2001 to 2011, when General Motors awarded a new contract to G4S for security services beginning in January 2012, and formed the Renaissance Center Management Company, a joint venture majority owned by G4S. Allied Universal assumed these services, and the majority stake in the subsidiary, with their acquisition of G4S in 2021.

In November 2023, a report was published revealing multiple lawsuits, complaints, and a whistleblower report accusing Security Police officers of racially profiling, harassing, assaulting, and illegally detaining Black visitors, in numerous incidents dating back to 2011. They alleged that officers had a radio code to indicate the presence of "undesirables," and deleted video evidence to conceal illegal activities. Following these reports, the Michigan State Police opened an investigation into the officers' conduct. General Motors directed Allied Universal to remove the accused officers from its properties, mandated that all officers undergo racial sensitivity and de-escalation training, and stated that it would reconsider its relationship with the company. By December, GM revoked the officers' arrest authority, ordered them to stop carrying handcuffs, and reduced the number of armed officers. Renaissance Center Management Company surrendered its private policing license in March 2024, and the Security Police were replaced with standard Allied Universal security guards.

In February 2025, General Motors hired Inter-Con Security to replace Allied as its security contractor for U.S. properties, including the RenCen.

== Notable events ==
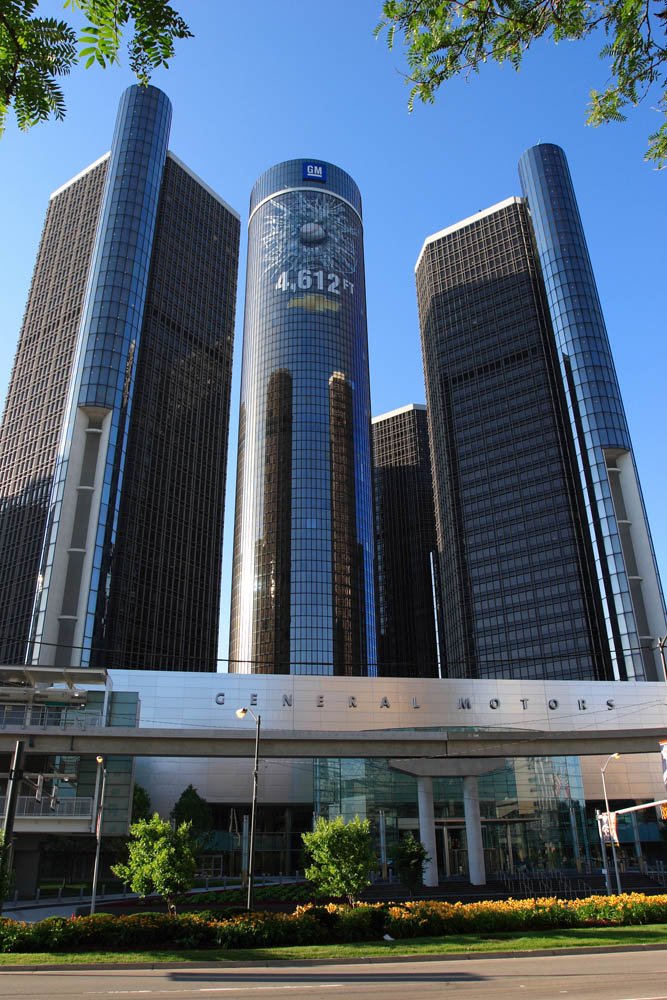
Renaissance Center shows a giant baseball hitting the building and the words, “4,612 ft.,” the distance to Comerica Park’s home plate, during the MLB All-Star Game (2005).

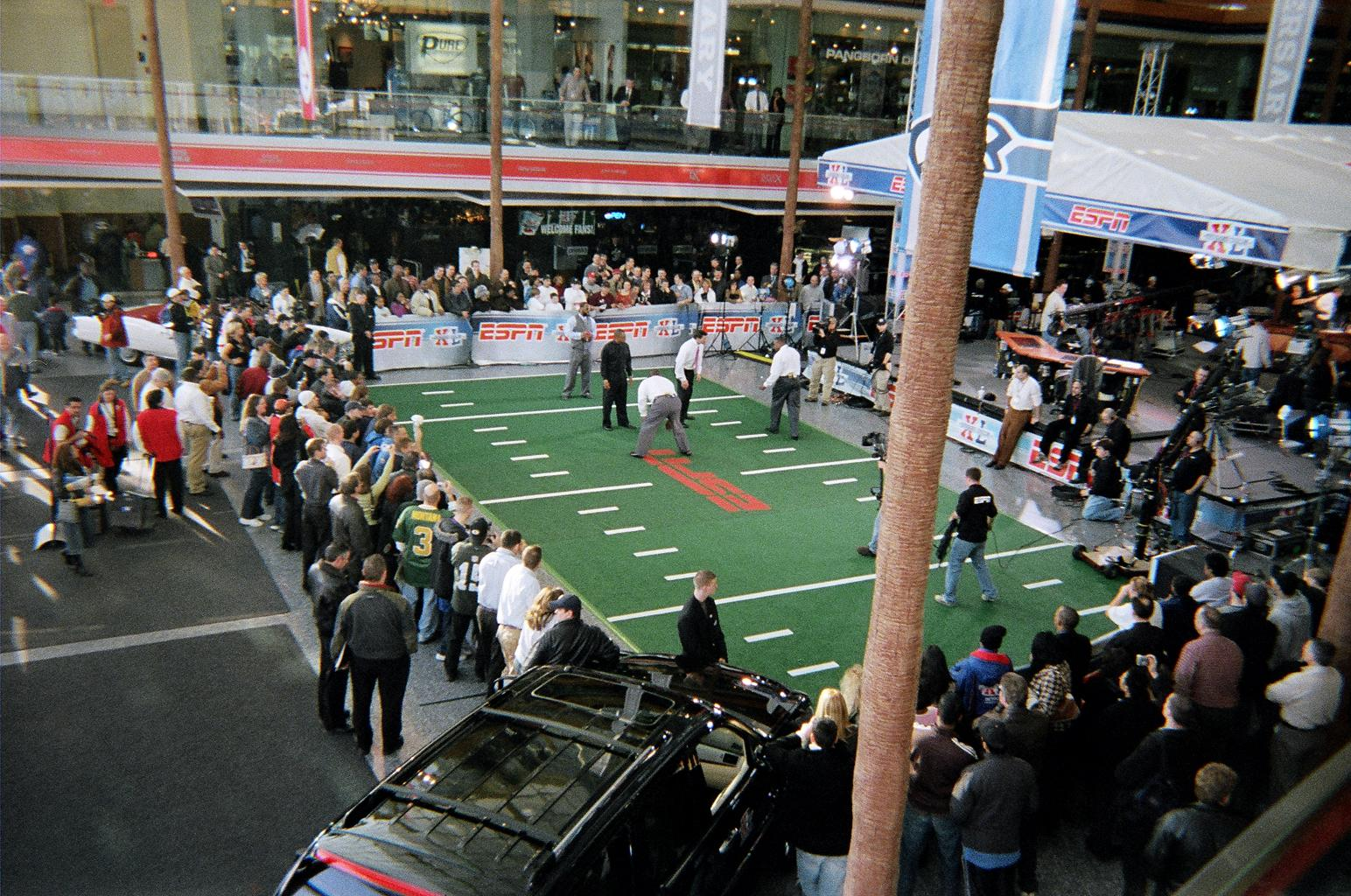
The Wintergarden provides contiguous main floor exhibition space, which was used by the media during Super Bowl XL (2006).

- For the 2005 Major League Baseball All-Star Game, which was played at Comerica Park in Detroit, the center tower of the Renaissance Center was wrapped with an image of a large baseball smashing into the tower, with "4,612 FT" written below it to indicate the distance from home plate at Comerica Park.
- The Renaissance Center served as the media center for Super Bowl XL in 2006, with the Wintergarden used as a broadcast studio for ESPN's pre-game programming. The central tower was wrapped with a large logo promoting the event.
- In 2008, GM hosted a centennial gala in the Wintergarden, which included the reveal of the production Chevrolet Volt.
- From 2010 to 2022, the Renaissance Center hosted Youmacon, an annual anime convention. The event was hosted entirely at the RenCen in 2010 and 2011, and later shared with Cobo Center (now Huntington Place) beginning in 2012. In 2015, the convention featured a performance by the rock band Crush 40, and in 2018 it featured a performance from Capcom concert tour group Capcom Live!, both of which were held at the Renaissance Center.
- A concert series, called Rockin' On the Riverfront, was held in the riverfront plaza from 2011 to 2019. The concert series featured acts like Pat Benatar, Rick Derringer, The Guess Who, Blue Öyster Cult, Randy Bachman, Foreigner, Dave Mason, Starship, REO Speedwagon, Ace Frehley, Eddie Money, Loverboy, 38 Special, Steppenwolf, Vince Neil, Jon Anderson, and many more.
- Since 2023, the annual Detroit Grand Prix has been hosted on the streets surrounding the RenCen, with the event offices and media center located inside, and public events held in the center and adjacent parking garages.
- The Michigan Democratic Party hosted its 2025 annual convention in the RenCen.
- The 2026 Motor City Furry Con was held in the RenCen.

== In popular culture ==
Given the RenCen's prominent position in Detroit's skyline, it appears in a myriad of media depicting the city. The following is an incomplete list of notable appearances in popular media.

- The opening scenes of Thunder in the Skies, the sixth episode of the BBC science-history documentary Connections (1978), were visibly filmed in the then-new Renaissance Center.
- The Renaissance Center is featured in the film Action Jackson (1988).
- In Collision Course (1989), Pat Morita's and Jay Leno's characters first meet in the Renaissance Center; Morita's character is considered a suspect and chased through the hotel.
- A chase scene in Bird on a Wire (1990) was filmed inside the RenCen.
- In the opening scene of Renaissance Man (1994), Danny DeVito's character drives down Jefferson Avenue, late for a business meeting at the Renaissance Center, when he receives the phone call that fires him from his job.
- The Renaissance Center is featured in Grosse Pointe Blank (1997).
- In Out of Sight (1998), the exterior is featured briefly and later the main characters meet in the revolving restaurant atop the Renaissance Center.
- In The Upside of Anger (2005), Kevin Costner plays a DJ for WRIF, whose studio (as depicted in the film) is housed in the Renaissance Center.
- Killshot (2008) features an opening scene in which Mickey Rourke's character, a hitman, drives a blue Cadillac along Jefferson Avenue, and enters the Marriott to assassinate a mafia leader.
- The History Channel's Life After People: The Series "Roads to Nowhere" episode featured the Renaissance Center.
- It was used as a primary filming location for Real Steel (2011).
- In a book by Adrian Humphreys titled The Weasel: A Double Life in the Mob, the former driver of Jimmy Hoffa and a mob associate Marvin "The Weasel" Elkind stated that Hoffa is buried in the foundations of the Renaissance Center (2011).
- The series finale of Motor City Masters was filmed in the GM World exhibit in the lower level of the Renaissance Center in 2014.
- The Renaissance Center was prominently featured in Need for Speed (2014).
- The RenCen is depicted in the album art of the Eminem albums Recovery (2010) and Curtain Call 2 (2022). His music video for "Lose Yourself" was filmed in Detroit, thus contains numerous shots of the city, including the building.
- GM's 2022 Super Bowl commercial was set in the RenCen. The ad depicted Dr. Evil and other characters from the Austin Powers films seizing control of the company, and meeting in a fictional office on an upper floor of the central tower. As part of the promotion, Dr. Evil's face was displayed on the actual tower's screens, in place of the GM logo, in the weeks preceding the Super Bowl.

== See also ==
- Architecture of metropolitan Detroit
- List of tallest buildings in Detroit
- List of tallest buildings in Michigan
- List of tallest buildings in the United States
- List of largest buildings in the world
