= Court of Flags Resort =

Coordinates: 28°28′42″N 81°27′08″W

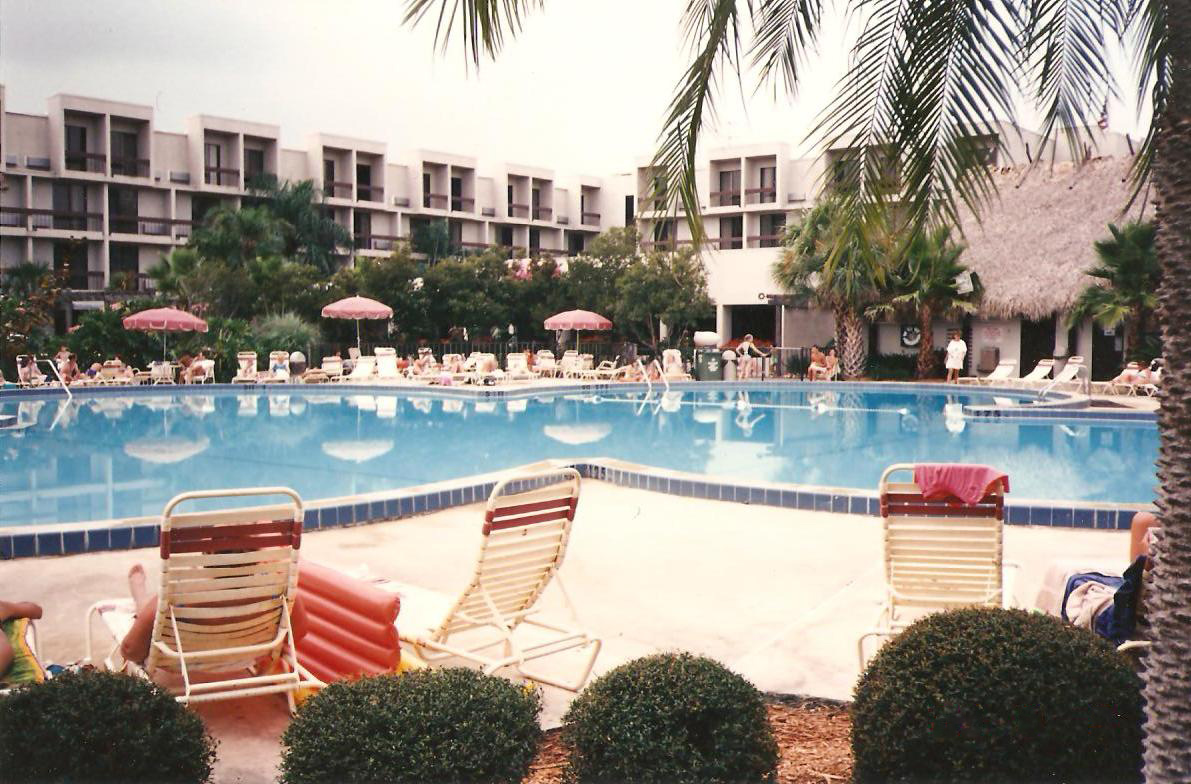
Court of Flags in 1989

The Court of Flags Resort was a resort located in Orlando, Florida, USA.

== History ==
The resort was built by US Steel in 1972 and opened in 1974. It was a popular upscale resort when it opened, and later in its life it became more of a budget resort. In December 2002 it abruptly closed and in 2006, it was demolished to make room for the new Citymark of Orlando; this never materialized. It was located near International Drive, on Major Boulevard just across the street from Universal Orlando Resort, and just across the street from the now defunct Mystery Fun House. The lot is now the site of Lexus of Orlando.

=== Name changes ===
The resort changed names a few times during its life:

- When opened it actually was under three hotel brands (Flags) at one time. Admiral Benbow Inn (one building - 200 rooms), Sheraton Motor Inn (two buildings - 400 rooms), and Quality Inn (one building - 200 rooms)
- Court of Flags until 1982
- Ramada Court of Flags – 1982 to 1986
- Delta Court of Flags – 1986 to 1991
- Delta Orlando Resort – 1991 to Dec 2002 (never reopened)
- In 2001, the hotel was to be remodeled into a Doubletree resort. After tourism declined following the September 11 attacks, the plans never materialized.

== Construction ==
The Court of Flags Resort is noted for its unique construction type. The rooms were stacked on top of each other and with framing and concrete added around them. They used the same system at the Polynesian Resort and part of the Contemporary Resort at Walt Disney World.

- U.S. Steel movie clip showing process of how the rooms were installed at the Contemporary. The buildings were all built off site the same way for both the slide in and stack type construction.

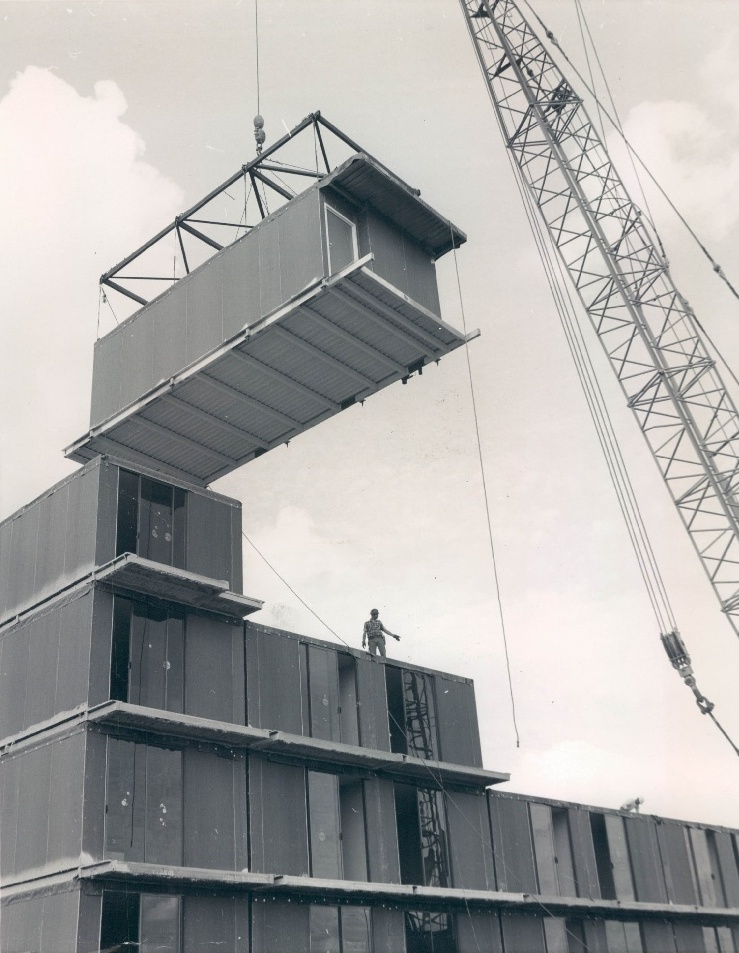
Court of Flags construction by US Steel

US Steel thought this new system of building would catch on and revolutionize construction but the system had flaws that were not known until later. The buildings shifted and settled. The air space between the rooms kept too much moisture and let mildew grow.

The facility for assembling the modular steel rooms used in the Walt Disney World hotels and the Court of Flags were by American Bridge Division. They produced 816 room units for the Court of Flags. 16 of those were for the suites, which used two units each.

The resort consisted of four separate guest room buildings. It housed a total of 800 rooms with 16 suites. It also had three pools, three restaurants, a lounge, and lots of conference space.

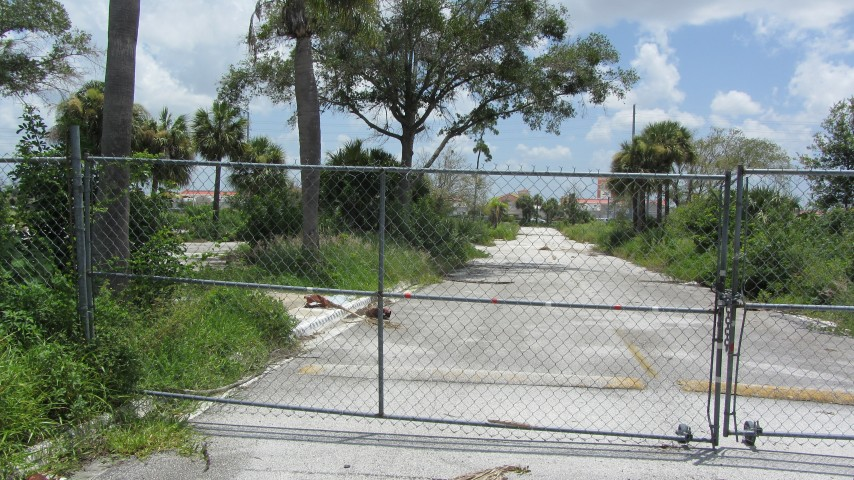
The Court of Flags six years after its demolition
