= Shades of Green (resort) =

Hotel at Walt Disney World

Coordinates: 28°24′08″N 81°35′33″W

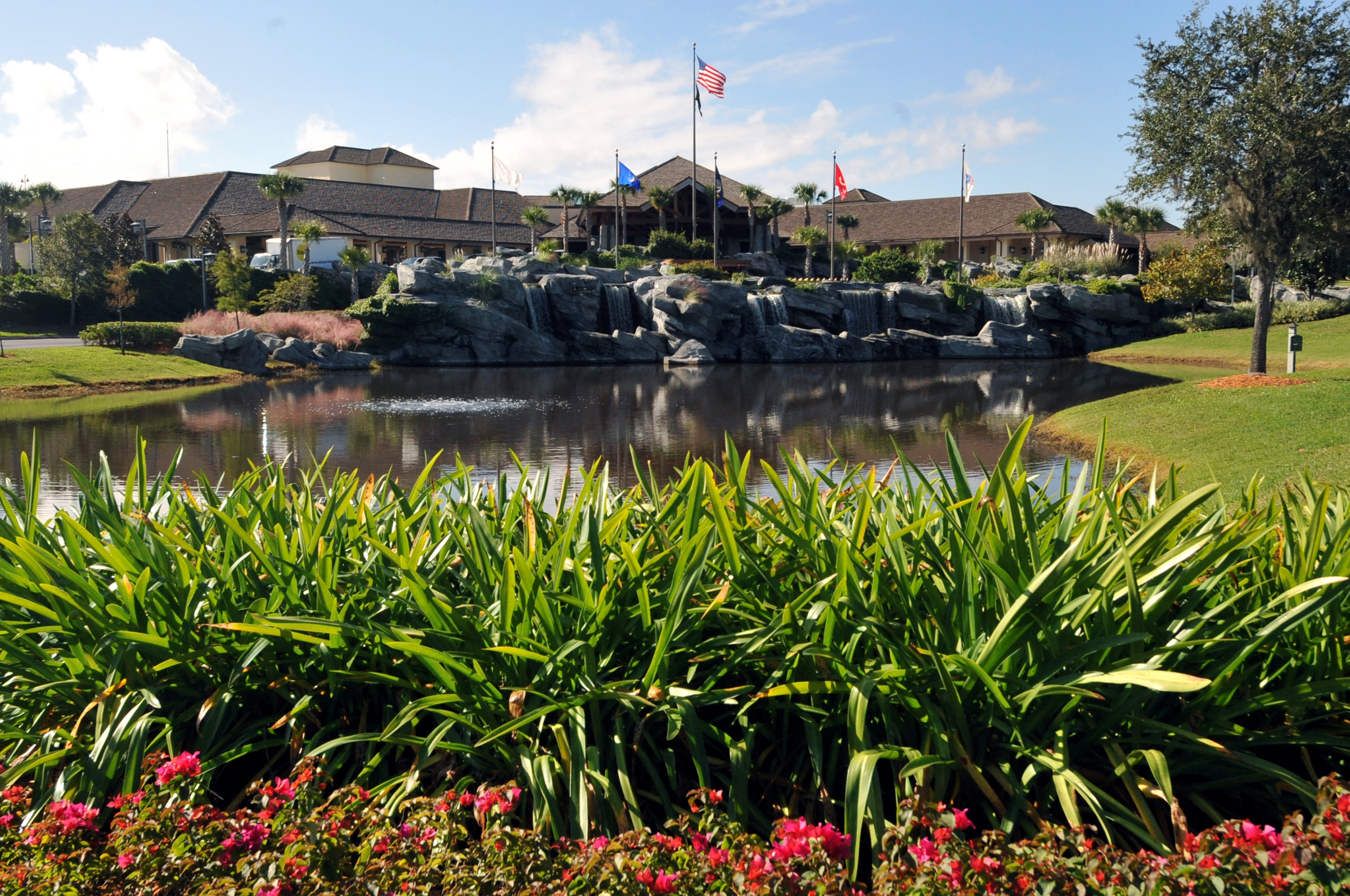
- Shades of Green in 2010
- Interactive map of the Shades of Green area

General information
- Type: Resort
- Location: Magic Kingdom Resort Area
- Opened: December 1973 (as Disney's Golf Resort); February 1, 1994 (renamed Shades of Green)
- Operator: Armed Forces Recreation Centers

Other information
- Number of rooms: 583
- Number of suites: 11

Website
- shadesofgreen.org

Shades of Green is a resort owned by the United States Department of Defense (DOD) on the Walt Disney World Resort property in Bay Lake, Florida. While the resort is within the Walt Disney World Resort, it is annexed as a military resort. It is one of five Armed Forces Recreation Centers (AFRC) resorts and is part of the military's Morale, Welfare, and Recreation (MWR) program. The resort was expanded between 2004 and 2006 and funds itself from non-appropriated funds, with all profits being reinvested into it.

== Resort details ==
Shades of Green is near Magic Kingdom, southwest of the Polynesian Village Resort. However, it is not served by the monorail system. Instead, transportation around Walt Disney World is provided exclusively by a fleet of buses operated by a private contractor and separate from the Disney Transport system. These buses shuttle guests between the resort and the Transportation and Ticket Center, Disney's Animal Kingdom, Disney's Hollywood Studios, Disney Springs and the water parks.

The resort's motto "Serving Those Who Serve" reflects its design as a retreat for military personnel of all ranks, their families, and their guests. As guests approach Shades of Green, they are greeted by a flag array atop a rock formation with waterfalls. Each branch of the U.S. military is represented with a large American flag and a smaller POW/MIA flag above them.

Shades of Green does not have a theme like other Disney resorts. The resort has a modern country club aesthetic and is surrounded by wooded areas, waterfalls, and tropical gardens. It offers 586 guest rooms, most of which are standard rooms with over 480 square feet (45 m^{2}) of space. Eleven suites can accommodate up to eight people.

The resort amenities include two tennis courts, two swimming pools, a children's pool, a hot tub, jogging routes, a fitness center, an arcade, and laundry facilities. Its pro shop offers golf lessons for people of all ages and skill levels, led by experienced instructors. The resort also provides 7,500 square feet (700 m^{2}) of banquet space with audiovisual facilities for events. As a U.S. Military-operated facility, merchandise is exempt from sales tax and rooms are exempt from hotel tax. The lease requires compliance with Disney standards.

Room rates are adjusted on a sliding scale, with prices increasing with rank and pay grade.

=== History ===
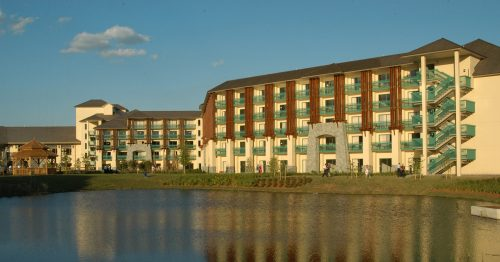
The resort's gazebo and Palm Rooms

The Shades of Green resort, originally owned by Disney, first opened as the Golf Resort in December 1973. It had 151 rooms and was located between the Palm and Magnolia golf courses. The resort was built to look like a country club, using wood and volcanic rock. Initially, it only had a clubhouse for the golf courses, with no guest rooms. The guest wings were added in 1973 to accommodate overnight visitors. The resort's main restaurant was called the Magnolia Room, later renamed the Trophy Room, and it was known for its "French fried ice cream" dessert. Guests could also enjoy live entertainment by a duo called Amos and Charles, who played a mix of soft rock, bluegrass, country, and folk music at the Magnolia Room.

The resort had an occupancy rate of 60–75% for most of the year. To attract a larger demographic beyond golfers, it was expanded and renamed The Disney Inn in February 1986. It opened an additional 150 rooms, and introduced a new Snow White theme; however, it was still small by Disney standards. The resort described itself as having "the rustic charm of a quiet country inn", with rooms decorated in a bright, airy style. The restaurant was renamed the Garden Gallery and served American cuisine and two more dining options were added: The Diamond Mine, a snack bar, and The Sand Trap, a poolside bar. The lounge was renamed The Back Porch. Recreation included the Diamond Mine Arcade, two pools, jogging paths, two tennis courts, and golf on either of the two adjacent championship courses. Rates in the early 1990s for the Disney Inn ranged from $195.00 a night for two queen beds and a sleeper sofa to $500.00 for suites.

In the early 1990s, the Army selected Orlando as the prime location for a continental U.S. resort. On February 1, 1994, the U.S. Department of Defense secured a 100-year lease for the resort, restricting its use to eligible guests under the MWR program. In 1996, the DoD purchased the resort for $43 million due to its success, while Disney retained ownership of the land.

The resort was renamed Shades of Green, which refers to the colors of U.S. military uniforms. The resort temporarily closed on April 1, 2002, for demolition of the original building and the construction of a brand-new building, designed by KBJ Architects. During the construction, guests were able to stay at Disney's Contemporary Resort at the Shades of Green rates. The renovation remodeled the guest rooms in the Magnolia Wing, doubled the number of guest rooms, added ten family suites, additional dining options, 7,500 sq ft (700 m^{2}) of meeting facilities, a fitness center, and a multi-level, 500-space parking garage. The guest rooms are in the resort's two wings, the Magnolia Wing and the Palm Wing. The Magnolia Ballroom accommodates up to 350 guests, and the Palm Wing offers five boardrooms on the fifth floor. The resort reopened on March 31, 2004, with 586 guest rooms including 11 family suites.

=== Walt Disney World privileges ===
Guests staying at Shades of Green are provided with transportation to most Walt Disney World theme parks via Shades of Green buses operated by a private contractor and separate from the Disney Transport system. The resort offers direct bus transportation to Disney's Animal Kingdom and Hollywood Studios theme parks but not to the Magic Kingdom or Epcot. Guests traveling to the latter two theme parks may take a bus to the Transportation and Ticket Center and then transfer to the monorail. Additionally, bus transportation is offered to Disney Springs and both of the Walt Disney World water parks, Blizzard Beach and Typhoon Lagoon.

Shades of Green is considered a Disney-owned resort for purposes of Extra Magic Hours at the theme parks. However, due to its ownership by the Department of Defense, it does not have certain amenities that are exclusive to Disney-owned resorts, including the ability to make room charges, free parking at Disney World's theme parks or the ability to participate in the Disney Dining Plan.

Discounted admission tickets for the Walt Disney World Resort parks and other Orlando-area parks and activities may be purchased at the Shades of Green Attraction and Ticket Sales Office, located on the lobby level. A Military Identification Card or a Department of Defense Identification Card must be presented at the time of purchase. The purchaser must meet the eligibility requirements listed below, but the tickets may be used by anyone. Purchasers do not need to be staying at the Shades of Green resort to benefit from the ticket discounts.

As of December 2017, Shades of Green guests are now able to link their reservations to the My Disney Experience page on the Disney website.

== Eligible guests ==
Shades of Green is an AFRC resort and is not open to the general public. Reservations can only be made by:

- Current Active-component members of the United States Armed Forces
- Current Reserve and National Guard members
- Retired from active component, Reserves, and National Guard
- Honorably discharged veterans with 100% Disabled Veterans (DAV) service-connected disability certified by the Department of Veterans Affairs (VA)
- Recipients of the Medal of Honor
- Current and retired civilian employees of the Department of Defense (DoD) and Coast Guard (CG)
- Recipients of the Purple Heart
- Former prisoners of war
- Veterans with VA-documented service-connected disability ratings
- Primary family caregivers of veterans, as designated under the VA Program of Comprehensive Assistance for Family Caregivers

Those who do not meet these eligibility requirements may stay at Shades of Green while on vacation with an eligible sponsor.

The Salute To Our Veterans program started in 2010, allows all military veterans who have received an honorable discharge from the military an opportunity to vacation at Shades of Green during January and September. Their discharge status must be verified by a DD Form 214.

The Shades of Green Survivors' Family Program is for eligible family members who have suffered the death of a sponsor on Active Duty, regardless of the cause.

In January 2020, the Department of Defense changed its access regulations to include Purple Heart recipients, former POWs, and disabled veterans and their caregivers as part of the Disabled Veterans Equal Access Act 2018. Veterans must be verified with their Veteran Health Identification Card (VHIC) or HEC form H623A. Caregivers are confirmed by their local VA Office of Community Care.

== Golf ==
Shades of Green is enveloped by two PGA Championship golf courses, Disney's Palm and Magnolia. Additionally, the resort features the nine-hole Oak Trail, a par-36 layout with holes ranging from 132 to 517 yards. Driving ranges and putting greens are also provided.
