= Shades of Green =

Shades of Green may refer to:

- Shades of green, an article about shades of the colour green
- Shades of Green (resort), a United States Department of Defense-owned resort at Walt Disney World
- Shades of Green (album), by jazz guitarist Grant Green
- "Shades of Green" (Star Trek: Lower Decks), 2024 television episode

== See also ==
- Category:Shades of green
- Shades of Greene, a 1975 British television series based on short stories by Graham Greene
