= California Grill =

Restaurant at Walt Disney World

California Grill is a restaurant located on the fifteenth floor of Disney's Contemporary Resort at Walt Disney World in Orlando, Florida.
