= Transportation and Ticket Center =

Transport hub at the Walt Disney World Resort

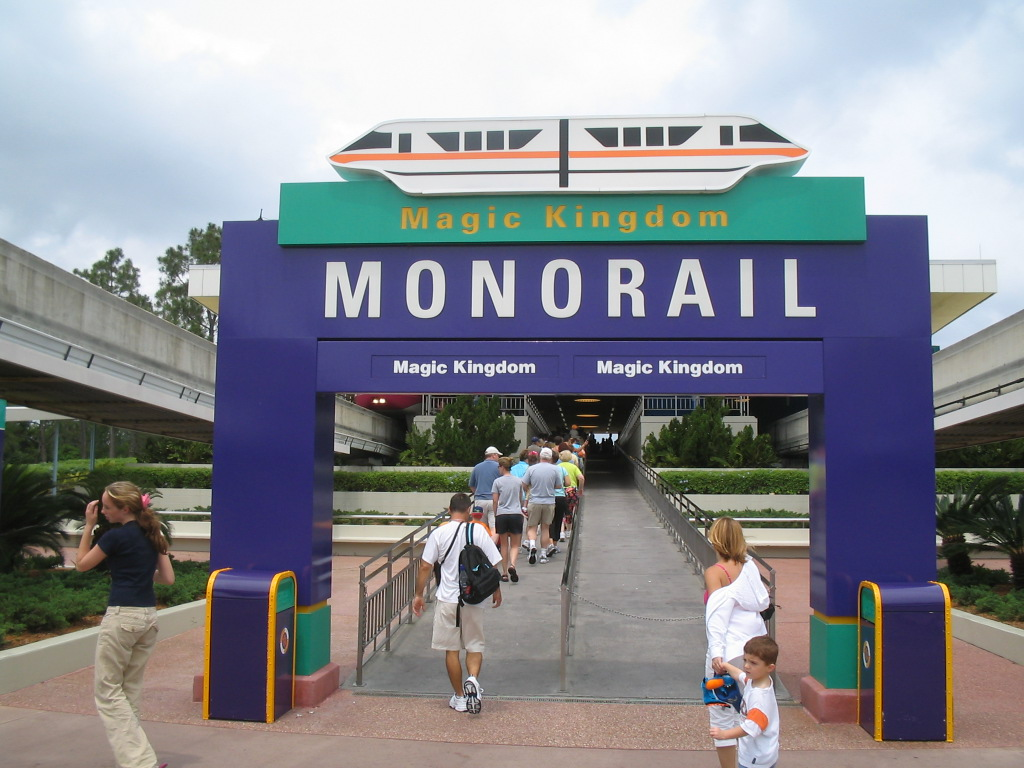
- Logo of the Transportation and Ticket Center Walkway up to the Express Monorail Line Platform

General information
- Location: 4600 World Drive; Bay Lake, Florida
- Coordinates: 28°24′21″N 81°34′46″W
- Owner: Walt Disney World
- Operator: Disney Transport
- Line: Walt Disney World Monorail System
- Platforms: 5 (4 with Spanish solution)
- Tracks: 3
- Bus stands: 39
- Connections: Ferry to Magic Kingdom; 56 300 303; Dolphin and Swan bus; Shades of Green bus

Construction
- Parking: 12,156 spaces
- Accessible: Yes

History
- Opened: October 1, 1971
- Rebuilt: 1982

Services
Preceding station	Walt Disney World Monorail System	Following station
Disney's Contemporary Resort One-way operation	Resort Line	Disney's Polynesian Village Resort Next clockwise
Magic Kingdom Park Next counter-clockwise	Express Line	Magic Kingdom Park One-way operation
Terminus	Epcot Line	Epcot Terminus
Location

The Transportation and Ticket Center (commonly abbreviated as TTC) is an intermodal transportation hub served by monorails, ferries, and buses at the Walt Disney World Resort in Bay Lake, Florida. The station serves all three lines of the Walt Disney World Monorail System, as well as conventional bus and taxis in the Greater Orlando Region.

== Services ==
=== Transport between the TTC and Theme Parks ===
Magic Kingdom lies more than a mile away from its parking lot, on the opposite side of the manmade Seven Seas Lagoon. Upon arrival, guests are taken by parking lot trams to the Transportation and Ticket Center (commonly abbreviated "TTC"), which sells tickets to the parks and provides transportation connections to Magic Kingdom. To reach the park, guests can use either the Walt Disney World Monorail System or a ferryboat.

The main monorail loop has two lines. The outer loop is a direct nonstop loop between the TTC and Magic Kingdom (called the Express Line), while the inner loop makes additional stops at the Contemporary, Polynesian, and Grand Floridian resorts (called the Resort Line).

EPCOT is accessible by a spur monorail line that was added upon that park's opening in 1982.

==== Security screening ====
Guests pass through security screening at the TTC prior to boarding the ferry or monorail so that upon arrival at the theme parks they may proceed straight to the entrance. Prior to 2017, screening was performed outside the entrance to Magic Kingdom after disembarking. The checkpoints were moved to the TTC to relieve congestion at the park entrance.

=== Transport between the TTC and other locations ===
Orlando's Lynx public transportation service serves the TTC. From the TTC, most routes head north towards the Magic Kingdom Cast Bus Station, intended for employees only. To the south, route 56 offers frequent service to Kissimmee station via Celebration, route 300 offers frequent express service to Lynx Central Station in Downtown Orlando via the Lynx Disney Springs Transfer Center, and route 303 offers peak-only service to the Lynx Washington Shores SuperStop.

Shades of Green, a hotel operated by the Armed Forces Recreation Centers on the Walt Disney World Resort property, offers a shuttle between the hotel and the TTC.

=== Transport to EPCOT ===
The Transportation and Ticket Center at Disney World also serves as a hub for anyone traveling from Magic Kingdom area resorts or Magic Kingdom Park to EPCOT. Guests staying at the following resorts would need to utilize the TTC to reach EPCOT as bus service is not provided:

- Bay Lake Towers
- Contemporary
- Grand Floridian Resort and Spas
- Island Tower
- Polynesian Village
- Polynesian Bungalows
- Villas at Disney's Grand Floridian Resort & Spa

Guests staying at one of these resorts will board the resort monorail and get off at the TTC. They will then transfer to a separate monorail line serving EPCOT.

Guests who wish to park hop from Magic Kingdom to EPCOT will board the monorail outside of Magic Kingdom and ride it to the TTC. They may also take the ferry boat to the TTC. Once there, they will utilize the spur line that runs from the TTC to EPCOT to access the park.

== Parking lot ==
The TTC has a parking lot with 12,156 spaces. Due to its size, Disney Transport operates two parking lot tram routes named Heroes and Villains, and the various sections of the lots have matching theming. The parking lot at the TTC is organized as follows:

Row No.	Name (2011–present)	Name (1971–2011)	Location
100–109	Woody	Chip & Dale	Heroes
110–126	Simba	Pluto	Heroes
127–146	Mulan	Daisy	Heroes
200–208	Aladdin	Minnie	Heroes
209–225	Peter Pan	Goofy	Heroes
226–237	Rapunzel	Donald	Heroes
304–311	Jafar	Sleepy	Villains
312–328	Hook	Happy	Villains
329–340	Ursula	Sneezy	Villains
400–409	Zurg	Dopey	Villains
410–426	Scar	Grumpy	Villains
427–436	Cruella	Bashful	Villains

== Other services ==
In addition to transportation and ticketing, there are a few other services at the TTC. In the main TTC plaza there is a Joffrey's Coffee kiosk. Across the parking lot is the Car Care Center which includes a Speedway gas station, an auto repair shop and an Alamo Rent a Car location. Additionally the Car Care Center houses one of Disney Transport's bus depots.

== Former bus service ==
There are nearly 40 bus stands located south of the monorail station. In the late 1980s/early 1990s this bus station was used for buses to and from hotels in other Walt Disney World Resort areas and to and from Disney's Animal Kingdom and Disney's Hollywood Studios theme parks. To reduce the traffic passing through the TTC, a bus station was built closer to Magic Kingdom. However, the station was quickly filled up and the Disney's Animal Kingdom and Disney's Hollywood Studios operated out of the TTC instead of the Magic Kingdom bus stop. In December 2013 a third bus loop opened at Magic Kingdom station, leaving the TTC without any regular Disney Transport bus routes.

== See also ==
- Rail transport in Walt Disney Parks and Resorts
