= Delta Hotels =

North American hotel chain

Delta Hotels by Marriott
- Formerly: Delta Hotels
- Type: Subsidiary
- Industry: Hospitality
- Founded: 1962
- Headquarters: Toronto, Canada
- Number of locations: 90 (September, 2020)
- Areas served: United States; Canada; Europe; Asia; Middle East
- Products: hotel and resort properties
- Parent: Marriott International

Delta Hotels by Marriott is a four-star brand of hotels and resorts located primarily in North America.

== History ==
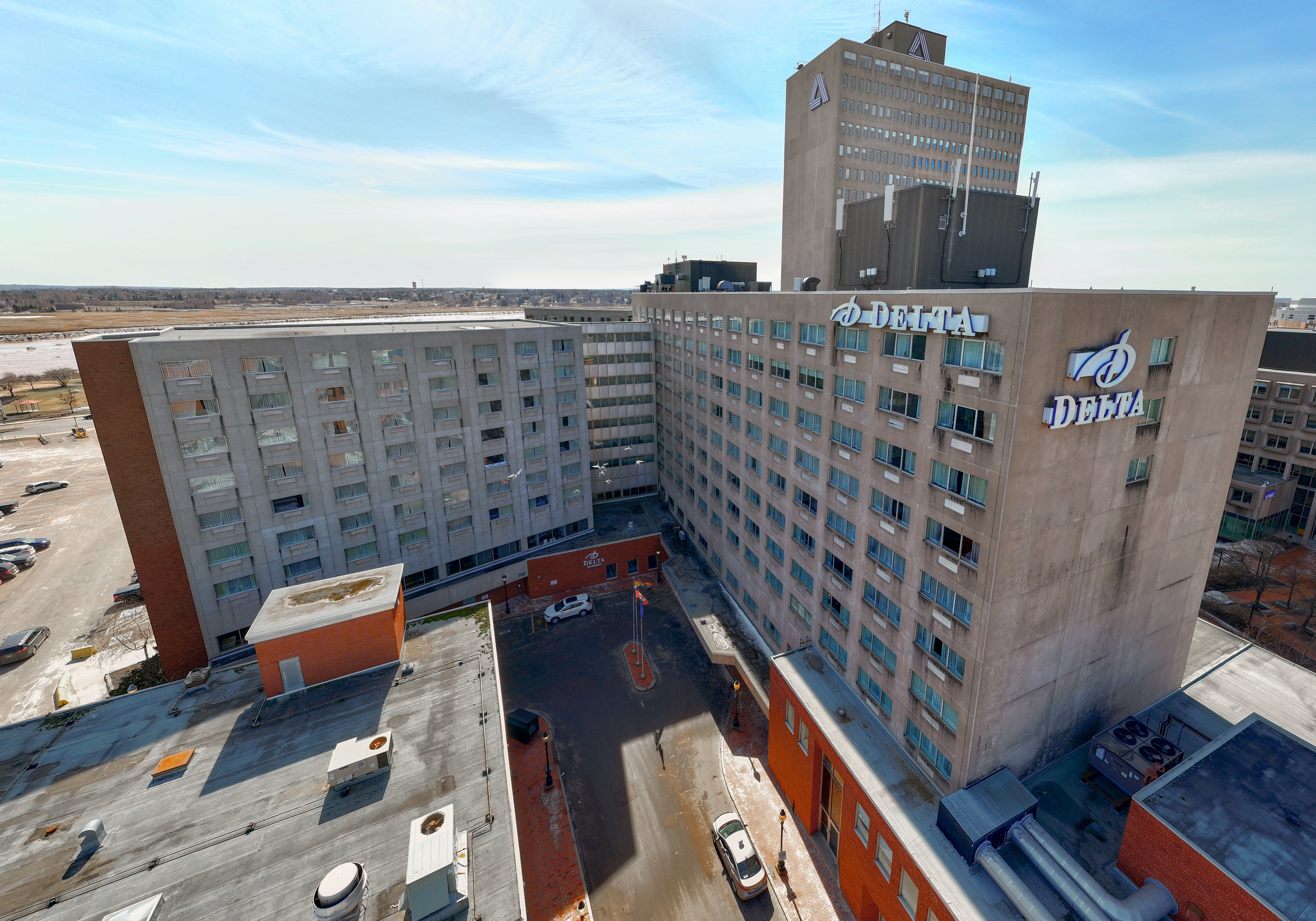
Delta Hotel in Moncton

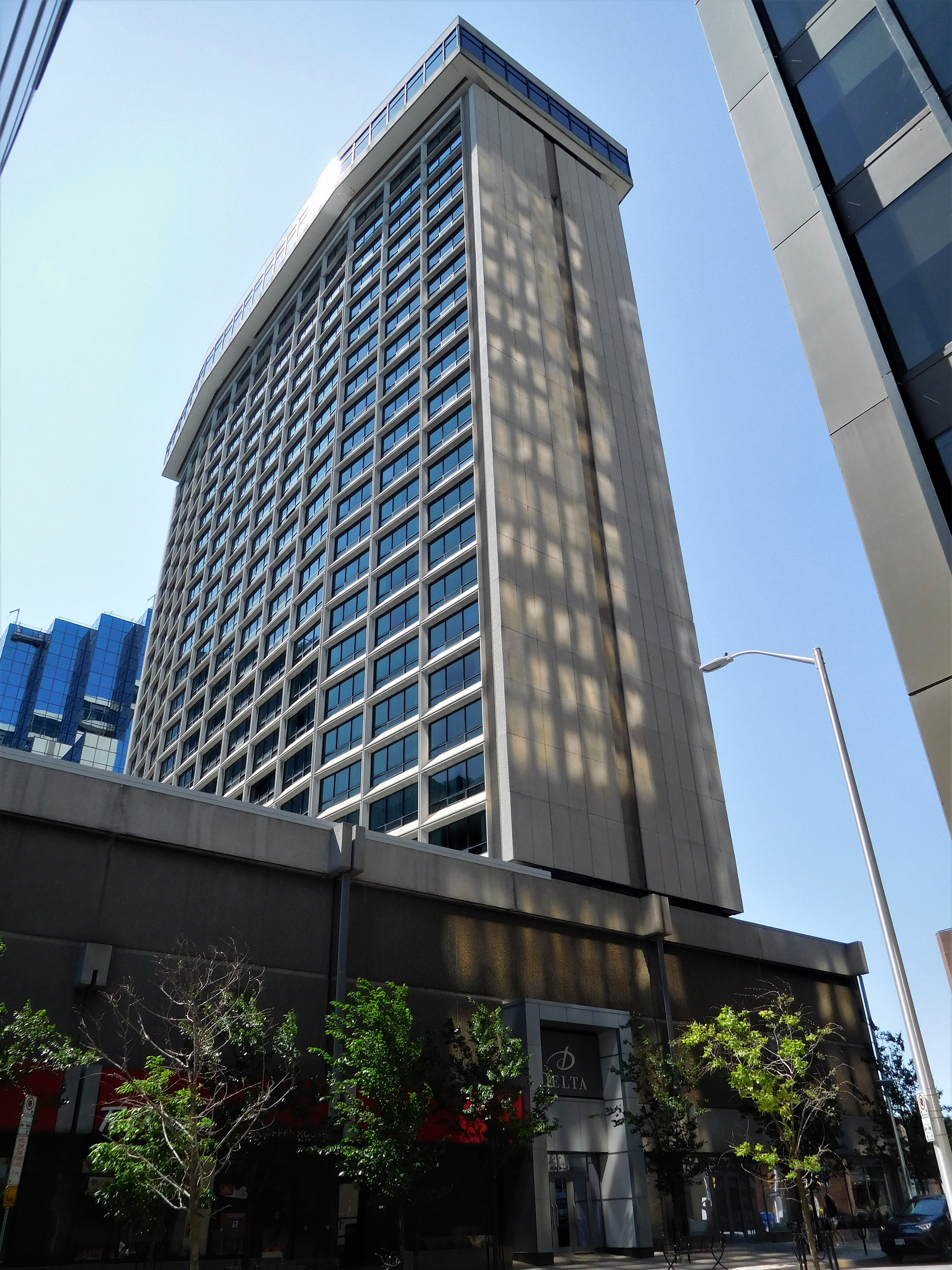
Delta Hotel in Ottawa

Former Delta Centre Ville Hotel in Montreal: (Image from 2006. Building was repurposed in 2013).

View over St. Lawrence River from breakfast room of former Delta Centre Ville Hotel in Montreal

=== Beginnings ===
In June 1962, William Pattison and his business partners opened the 68-room Delport Inn in Richmond, BC. That September, Western Hotels changed the location's name to the Vancouver Airport Inn, and assumed management until January 1964.

During 1965–1967, Delta Developments built four motels on Vancouver Island and leased or purchased two further motels in the BC interior. Driver Developments, which bought Delta Developments in 1969, experienced serious financial difficulties from its diverse investment portfolio within months. In 1970, Delta Hotels Limited assumed ownership and operation of the hotels and motels.

By mid-1974, the chain had been reduced to four properties.

=== Beyond BC ===
In 1975, Delta entered the Toronto market. By 1980, the six BC properties matched the six out-of-province properties. By 1985, there were four in BC, four in Ontario, and five across four other provinces. For example in Quebec, where in Montreal the Delta Centre Ville was operated. The owners, Canadian Imperial Bank of Commerce, Great-West Lifeco, and Bill Pattison, sold the chain to the Realstar Group of Toronto in 1988. A decade later, Realstar and partner Lai Sun Group resold it to Canadian Pacific Hotels (CP Hotels). During the 1990s, Delta operated a single U.S. hotel: the Delta Court of Flags Hotel in Orlando, Florida.

In 1999, after CP Hotels acquired the Fairmont brand, six CP properties were rebranded to supplement the existing 24 Delta properties, and the Delta chain became a wholly owned subsidiary of CP Hotels' two-thirds-owned Fairmont Hotels and Resorts. In terms of classification, Fairmont was four-star and Delta was three-star. After British Columbia Investment Management Corporation (BCI) acquired Delta in 2007, the brand expanded, and by 2013 the portfolio comprised 40 properties, of which 31 were managed (10 having the real estate owned), and nine were franchised.

=== Takeover by Marriott ===
In 2015, Marriott International acquired the chain, making Marriott the largest full-service hotel company in Canada. Augmenting the exclusively Canadian properties, two U.S. ones were added in 2016. U.S. properties now outnumber Canadian ones.

International expansion was first to Shanghai, then Frankfurt. Dubai, three in the United Kingdom, and Istanbul, followed. In August 2022, it was announced that 23 Marriott Hotels in the United Kingdom were to rebrand as Delta Hotels by Marriott.

In 2016, Delta Privilege rewards were extended to other Marriott locations, and Marriott cards were extended to Delta locations. In 2019, Marriott Bonvoy replaced the various Marriott group rewards programs.

== Marriott subsidiary ==
=== Accommodations ===
		North America	Europe	Middle E. & Africa	Asia & Pacific	Caribbean Latin Am.	Total
2015	Properties	36					36
2015	Rooms	9,385					9,385
2016	Properties	37					37
2016	Rooms	9,784					9,784
2017	Properties	49			1		50
2017	Rooms	12,373			339		12,712
2018	Properties	61	1		1		63
2018	Rooms	14,905	223		339		15,467
2019	Properties	72	5	1	1		79
2019	Rooms	17,376	729	360	339		18,804
2020	Properties	77	5	1	2		85
2020	Rooms	18,226	728	360	978		20,292
2021	Properties	82	6	3	2	1	94
2021	Rooms	19,312	1,078	718	978	117	22,203
2022	Properties	87	30	5	2	1	125
2022	Rooms	20,893	5,134	1,284	978	117	28,406
2023	Properties	92	31	6	4	2	135
2023	Rooms	21,730	5,446	1,443	1,529	366	30,514
