= Walt Disney World Monorail System =

Transit system in Florida, United States

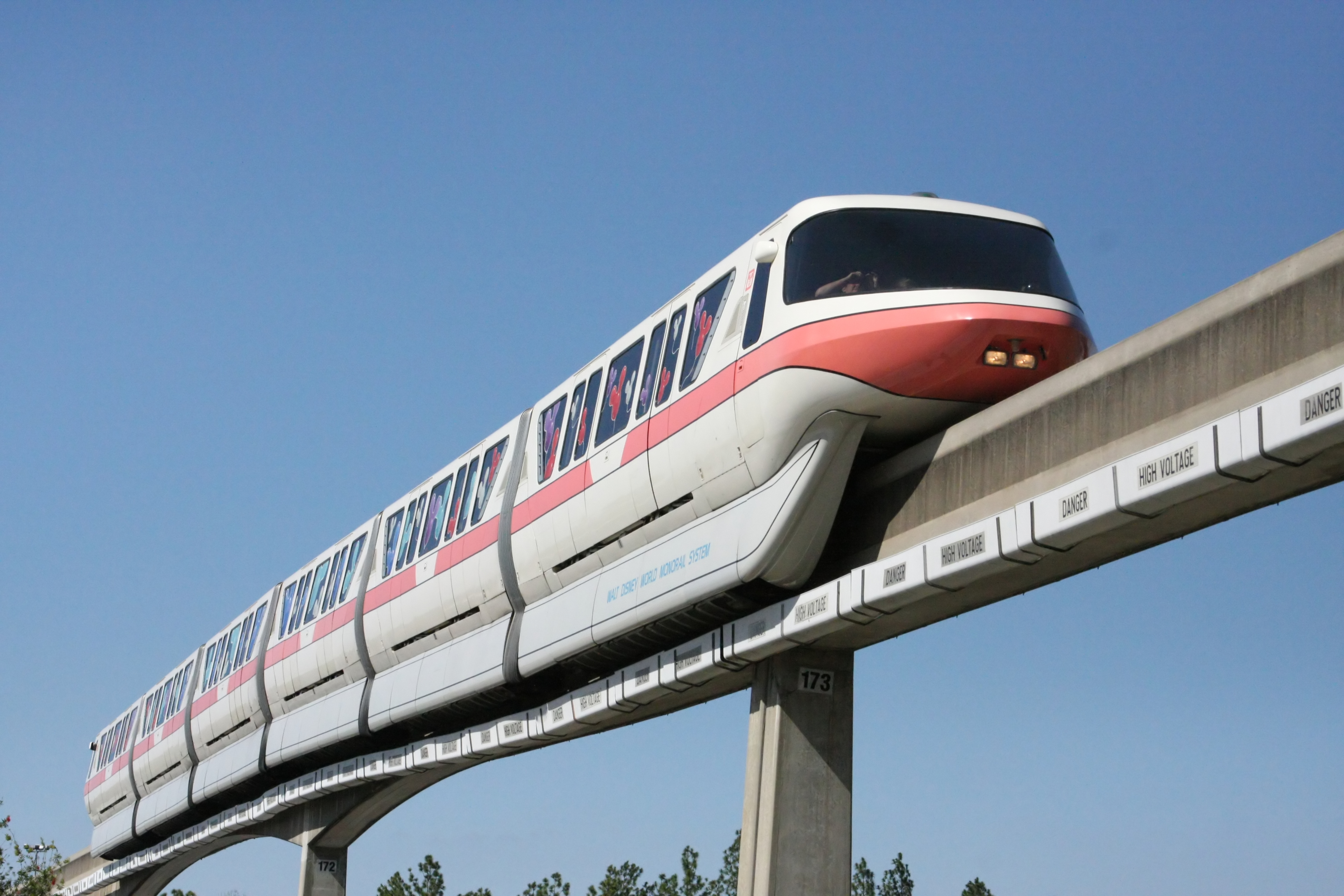
- Monorail Coral traveling on the Epcot Line in April 2009

Overview
- Owner: The Walt Disney Company
- Locale: Walt Disney World
- Stations: 6
- Website: Disney Monorail Transportation

Service
- Type: Straddle beam monorail
- System: Disney Transport
- Services: 3
- Operator: Disney Transport
- Rolling stock: 12 Bombardier Mark VI monorails
- Daily ridership: 150,000+
- Ridership: ~50,000,000

History
- Opened: October 1, 1971 (55 years ago)

Technical
- Line length: 14.7 mi (23.7 km)
- Character: Fully elevated
- Electrification: Contact rails, 600 V DC
- Operating speed: 30 mph (48 km/h) (avg.); 40 mph (64 km/h) (top)

The Walt Disney World Monorail System is a monorail serving Walt Disney World in Bay Lake, Florida, near Orlando. Operated by Disney Transport as part of the resort's public transportation system, it runs 12 Mark VI monorail trains across three lines of service.

First introduced in 1971, the system was Disney's second, following the Disneyland Monorail in California. It initially featured Mark IV trains running two services around the Magic Kingdom area: Resort and Express. In 1982, the system expanded to three services with an extension to Epcot, and by 1989, the fleet was upgraded to Mark VI trains.

As of 2016, the Walt Disney World Monorail was the third busiest monorail system globally, carrying over 150,000 passengers daily. It is surpassed by the Chongqing Rail Transit monorail system in China, where Line 2 and Line 3 combined accommodate more than 900,000 daily passengers, and the Tokyo Monorail line in Japan, which serves over 300,000 daily riders.

== Lines, stations, and infrastructure ==
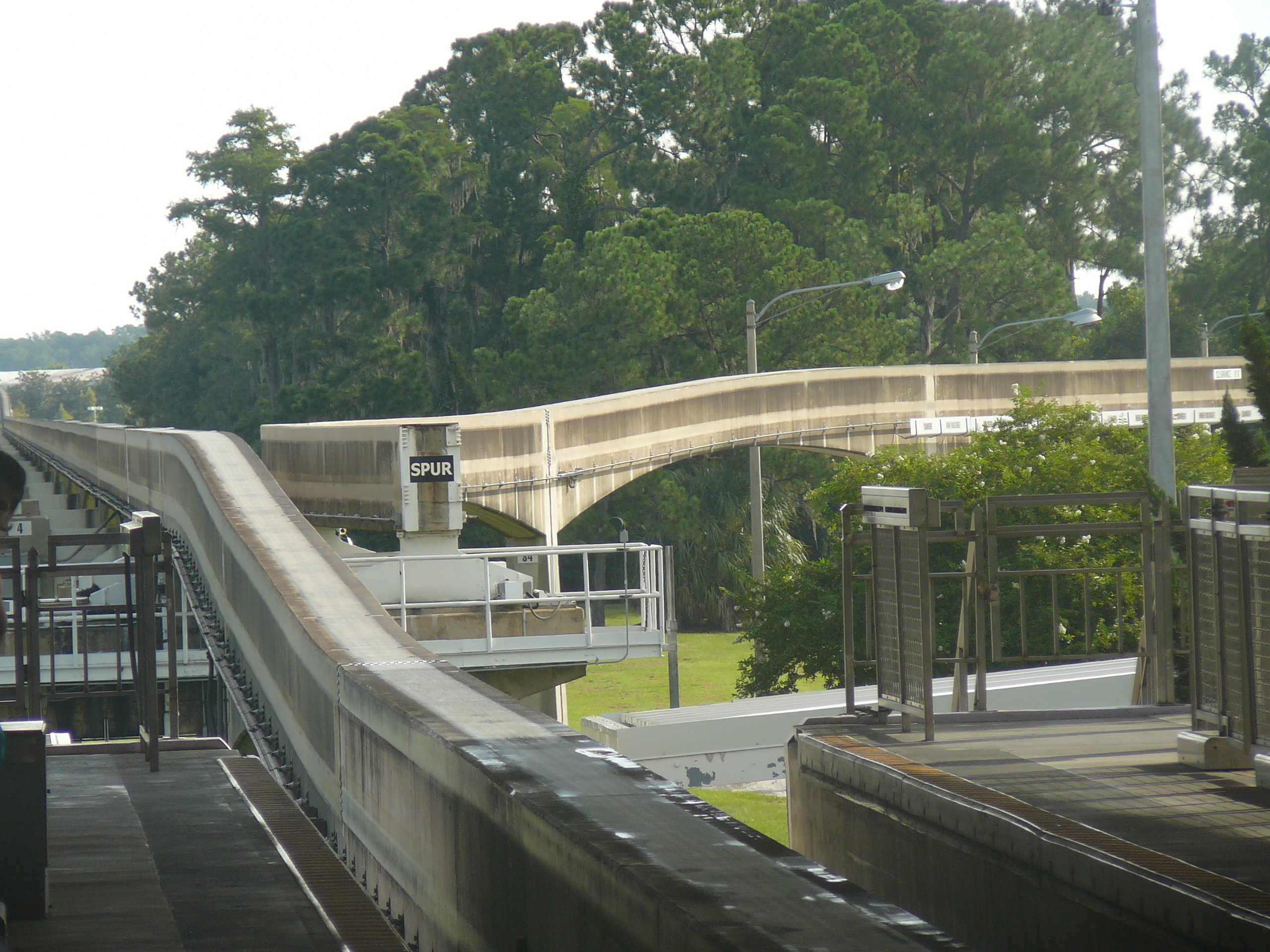
The switch track connecting the Epcot line with the Magic Kingdom Express beam at the Transportation and Ticket Center station

The Walt Disney World Monorail spans 14.7 miles (23.7 km), with around 50 million Disney guests traveling on the monorail each year. The system opened with the rest of the Walt Disney World Resort on October 1, 1971. It initially featured four stations: the Transportation and Ticket Center, Disney's Polynesian Resort, the Magic Kingdom and Disney's Contemporary Resort. The Epcot line and station were added during that park's construction, opening on October 1, 1982. The most recent addition was the Grand Floridian station, which was opened in 1988 along with the resort hotel. Since then, no further additions have been made, and no expansions are planned due to prohibitive construction costs, though a legal easement for monorail construction through Disney's Saratoga Springs Resort & Spa dating back to 1970 still exists.

There are two distinct routes on the monorail system, with three different services:

- Magic Kingdom Resort: runs clockwise around the inner beam (also called the lagoon beam), serving the resorts around the Seven Seas Lagoon with stops at the Magic Kingdom, Disney's Contemporary Resort, the Transportation and Ticket Center, Disney's Polynesian Village Resort, and Disney's Grand Floridian Resort and Spa. Service ends approximately 2 hours after the last park closes.
- Magic Kingdom Express: runs counter-clockwise in the morning around the outer beam (also called the exterior beam), providing nonstop service between the Magic Kingdom and the Transportation and Ticket Center. Beginning around November 2025, the express monorail began running a clockwise rotation in the afternoons and most evenings. On days where there are special ticketed events (e.g. Disney After Hours, Mickey's Not-So-Scary Halloween Party, etc.), service runs in the counter-clockwise direction for the entire day. Service ends approximately 60 minutes after the Magic Kingdom closes.
- Epcot: runs clockwise providing nonstop service between Epcot and the Transportation and Ticket Center, along a single beam. Service ends approximately 90 minutes after Epcot closes.

A spur track between the Magic Kingdom and Contemporary Resort stations connects the Express and Resort lines to the maintenance shop. A second spur connects the Epcot and Express lines and is located northeast of the Transportation and Ticket Center. There are four track switches on the main line: a crossover between the Resort and Express beams; connecting the Express beam to the shop spur; a switch connecting the Express beam to the Epcot spur; and a switch connecting the Epcot spur to the Epcot line.

The Express (outside) beam is typically used to move trains into and out of service on all lines, as it is directly connected to both spur tracks. It can also be used for Resort service when the inside beam must be taken out of service, although instances are extremely rare.

The monorail beams, which are made of steel-reinforced concrete with a polystyrene core to lighten their weight, came by train from Washington state.

== Rolling stock ==
=== Specifications ===
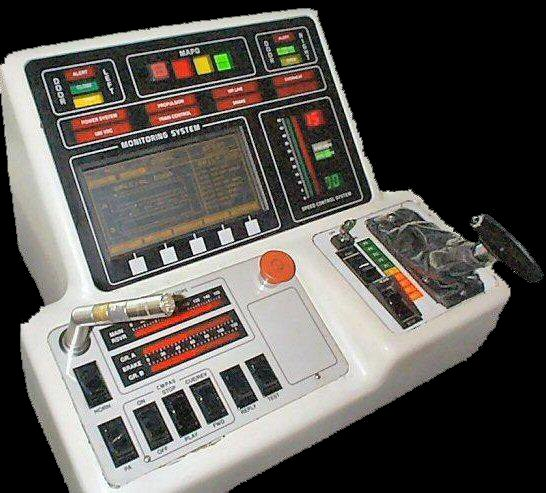
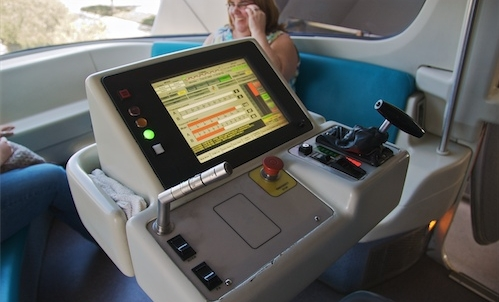
The old (top) and new (bottom) control systems of the Mark VI. The original control system served from 1989 with the introduction of Mark VI Blue until June 2007 when the final train, Blue, was converted to the new LMCU2 system.

The monorail operates with a fleet of 12 Mark VI trains built by Bombardier Transportation, which began to enter service in 1989. Each six-car train is 203 feet 6 inches (62.03 m) long and can carry up to 360 passengers. The trains are powered by 600 volts (V) of direct current delivered through stainless-steel-capped aluminum bus bars mounted on each side of the concrete beam. Each train has eight traction motors, each rated at 113 horsepower (84 kW).

Each train also carries seven inverters that convert the 600 V DC supply to 230 V AC for the air conditioners and air compressor, as well as a battery-backed 37 V DC low-voltage system for onboard electronics. A towing knuckle is provided at each end so the train can be pushed or pulled by a diesel-powered tractor if necessary.

The maximum operating speed is 40 miles per hour (64 km/h), with speed-restricted zones as low as 15 miles per hour (24 km/h). These limits are enforced by the onboard computer and cannot be overridden without a special lockout. Attempting to exceed the limit in any zone results in an "overspeed stop."

Trains are controlled using a moving block system, locally known as MAPO (after "Mary Poppins"), which is designed to maintain a minimum distance of 500 feet (150 m) between trains during normal operation. If the system detects that a train is closer than 500 feet (150 m) to the one ahead, the brakes are applied immediately and cannot be released until sufficient spacing is restored or the operator overrides the system, such as when moving a train between beams. Failure to maintain adequate spacing is known as an "overrun," and is treated as an extremely serious offense.

Below is a list of the models of monorails (and their specifications) that have operated on the Walt Disney World Monorail System:

Mark IV Monorail
Manufacturer	Martin Marietta
Period of Service	1971 to 1991
Length:	5 cars: 171 ft (52 m)
	6 cars: 201 ft (61 m)
Width:	8 ft 10 in (2.69 m)
Height:	11 ft 7 in (3.53 m) (6 ft 6 in (1.98 m) above top of beam)
Weight:	5 cars empty: 92,000 lb (42,000 kg)
	5 cars gross: 122,600 lb (55,600 kg)
	6 cars empty: 108,500 lb (49,200 kg)
	6 cars gross: 145,100 lb (65,800 kg)
Passenger Capacity:	5 cars: 40 per car + 4 in the nose = 204 seated
	6 cars: 40 per car + 4 in the nose = 244 seated

Mark VI Monorail
Manufacturer	Bombardier Transportation
Period of Service	1989 to present
Length:	203 ft 6 in (62.03 m)
Width:	8 ft 4.5 in (2.553 m)
Headroom:	6 ft 10.75 in (2.1019 m)
Height (from bottom of skirt to top of shell):	12 ft .5 in (3.670 m)
Weight (empty):	92,000 lb (42,000 kg)
Passenger capacity:	20 seated per car
	40 standing per car
	360 people total per train

==== Automation ====
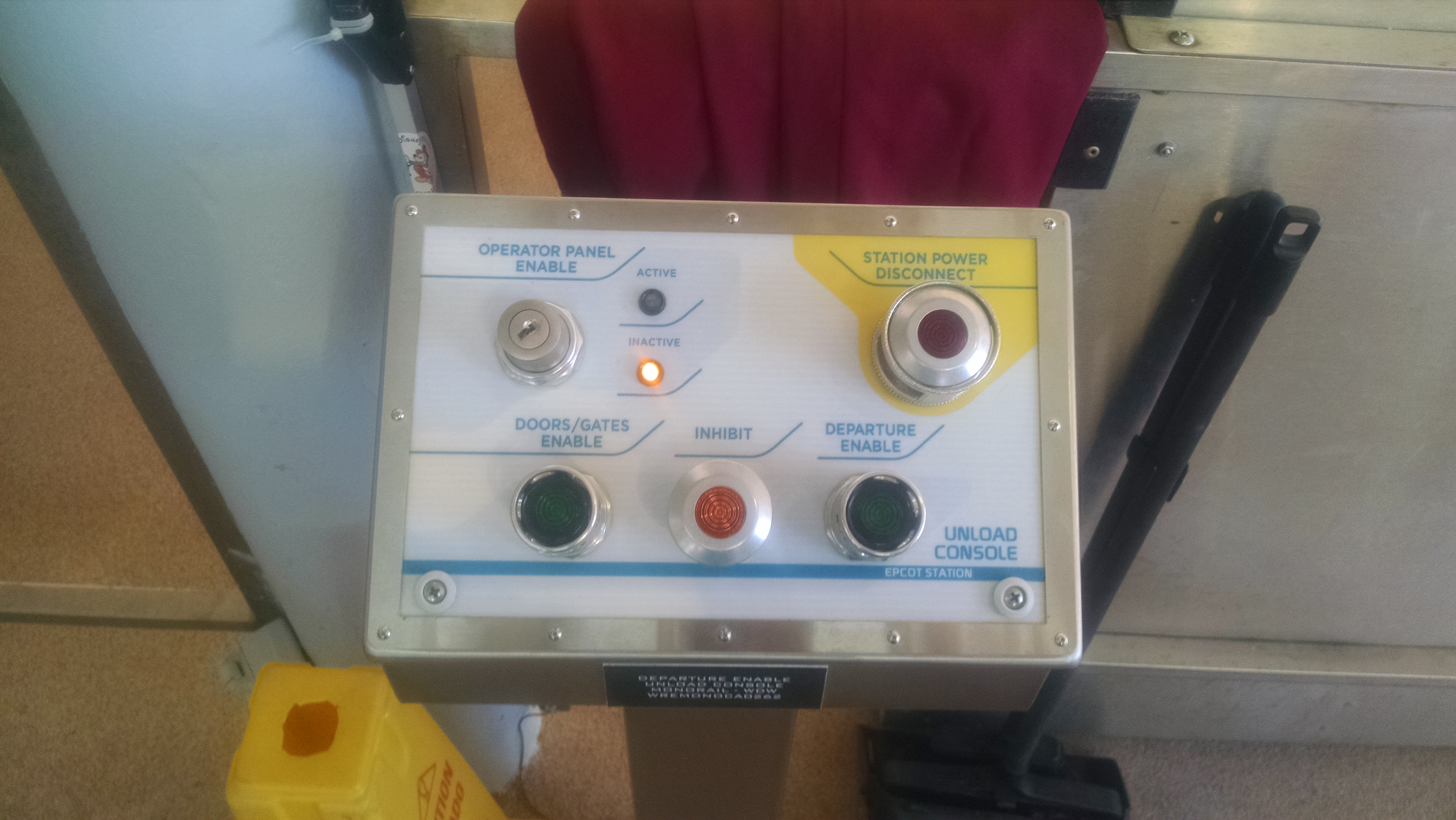
Since the implementation of automation, platform attendants use a control panel located on each station platform to operate the monorail.

Starting June 22, 2014, the monorail began operating on a different timetable in order to accommodate work to automate the system. Disney stated that the system would provide a more efficient service with enhanced safety, as well as more frequent dispatch of the trains, faster switching times, and monorail arrival information. Pilots are still seated in the front cab, but only supervise the monorail in case of an emergency. Platform attendants operate a control panel to dispatch and operate the monorail system.

=== Identification ===
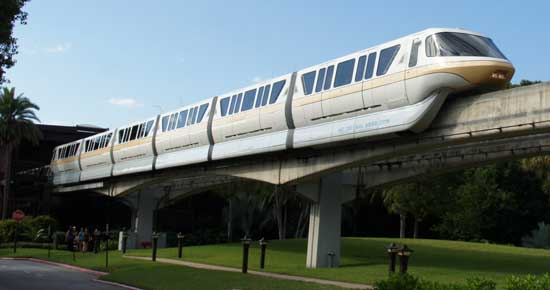
Monorail Peach outside Disney's Polynesian Resort (2011).

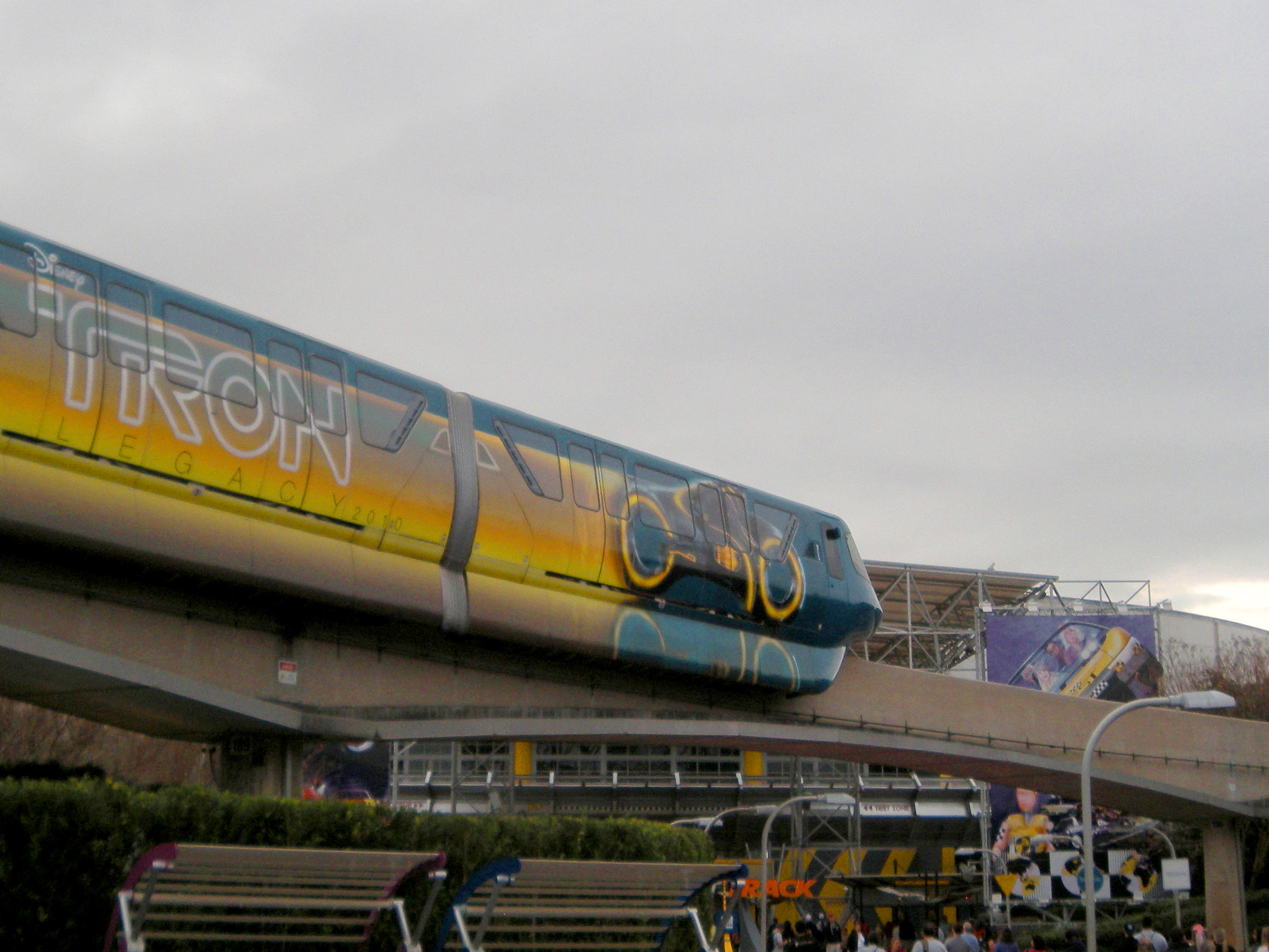
For a while, Monorail Coral featured Tron artwork from Disney's Tron: Legacy.

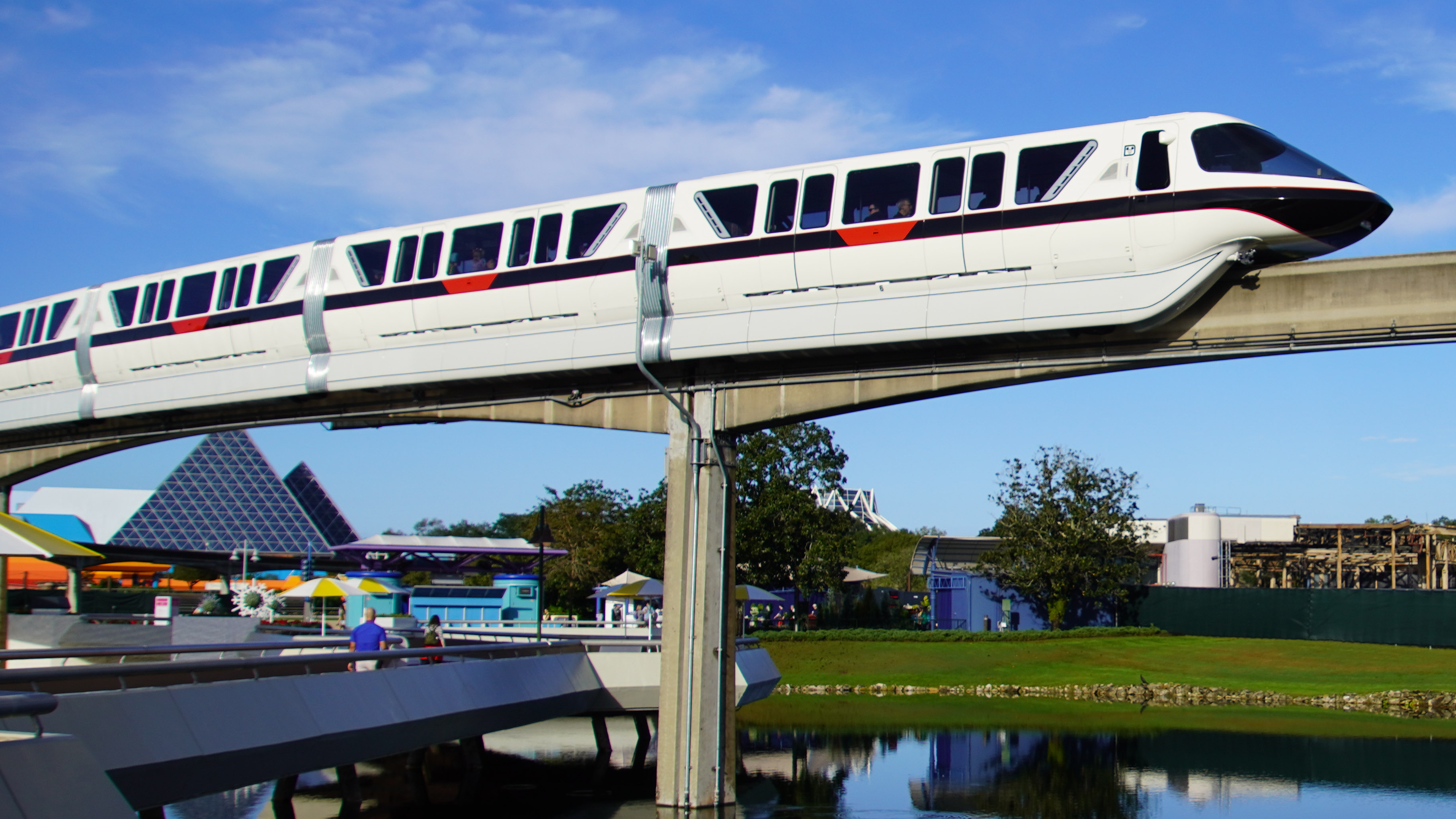
Monorail Black traveling inside Epcot (2019).

Each train is identified by a colored stripe, and given a name according to that color. The complete list of colors used is below:

- Blue
- Black
- Coral
- Gold
- Green
- Lime
- Orange
- Peach
- Pink *
- Purple *
- Red
- Silver
- Teal
- Yellow

* Retired following July 2009 crash

An example of the former Lime Delta.

To help visually identify Green from Lime, Pink from Coral and Blue from Teal, the Lime, Teal, and Coral stripes have trapezoidal "deltas" within the color stripe in between the passenger doors on each car. Originally, Monorail Lime's deltas (and those of the older Mark IV Lime) were painted a dark blue in homage to the original Walt Disney World monorail cast's costume colors (lime and blue), but the colors were changed when the entire monorail fleet was repainted in the early 2000s. In mid December 2018, Monorail Lime's white delta was repainted to the original dark blue scheme following a refurbishment; these were retained following another refurbishment in 2022. Monorails Coral and Teal had white deltas to differentiate them from Monorails Pink and Blue, respectively. Although Monorail Pink was retired from service following its crash with Monorail Purple in July 2009, Monorail Coral retained its white deltas until October 21, 2021, after which it was given teal deltas. Monorail Teal was given black deltas after its refurbishment in 2022.

In November 2009, Disney put Monorail Teal into service. Monorail Teal was built using the undamaged portions of the two trains involved in the July 5, 2009 crash. The colors of the two trains involved, Pink and Purple, were retired from service. The twelfth train, Peach, was placed into service on October 7, 2011, to restore the resort's fleet back to twelve trains. It was assembled using the undamaged center cars from the Purple train, but with new end cabs replacing the damaged sections from the Pink and Purple trains.

=== Special liveries ===
In March 2010, Disney debuted Monorail Coral in Tron livery on the Epcot line as part of a marketing plan for Tron: Legacy.

Since the Tron paint scheme in 2010, there have been several other monorail wraps. On March 31, 2012, Monorail Red was converted into a special scheme commemorating the release of The Avengers, similar to the previous promotion for Tron: Legacy. The monorail ran on the Magic Kingdom line and sometimes on the Resort line as the Epcot line loops through the park itself, since Disney is not able to feature specified Marvel characters inside its Florida parks due to Marvel Entertainment's license agreement with Universal Destinations & Experiences that was in place prior to the purchase of Marvel in 2009.

In March 2013, Monorail Black was given a similar conversion to promote the release of Iron Man 3. In April 2013, Monorail Teal was converted into a special scheme commemorating the release of Monsters University. In November 2015, Monorail Black was decorated in Star Wars designs commemorating the release of Star Wars: Episode VII - The Force Awakens. In February 2016, Monorail Orange was decorated in Zootopia designs and was named the Zootopia Monorail System to reflect the Zootopia Transit Authority, commemorating the release of Zootopia. In June 2018, Monorail Orange was decorated in Incredibles designs to promote the release of Incredibles 2. A year later, Monorail Yellow was decorated with Toy Story characters to promote Toy Story 4. In September 2021, Monorail Gold debuted with a wrap for the Walt Disney World 50th Anniversary.

=== Refurbishment ===
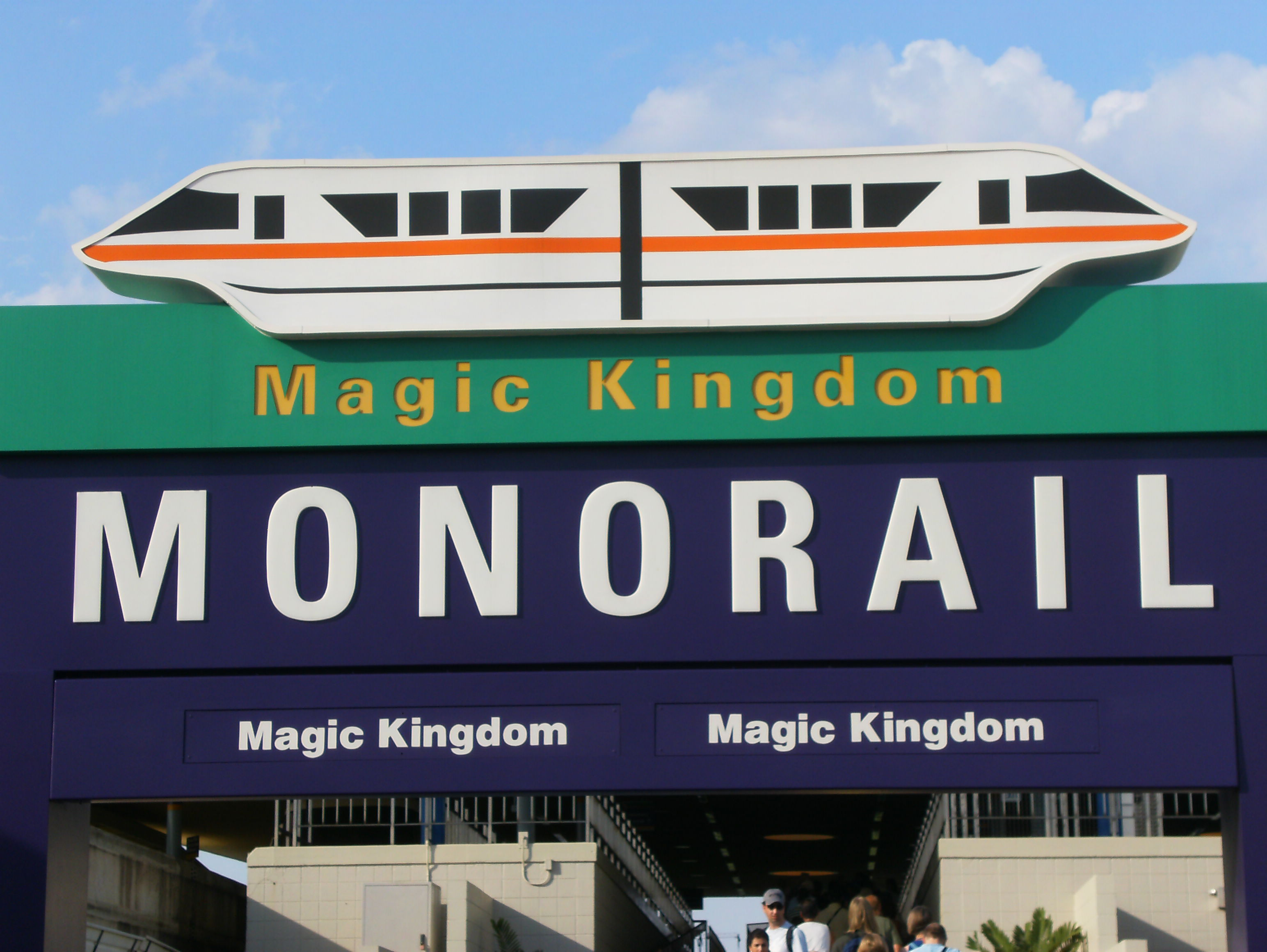
Entrance to the express TTC platform

Between June 2019 and August 2022, all of the monorails were refurbished with new brakes, a refurbished interior, and repainted exterior, each featuring an accent color delta.

A list of refurbishment dates is below:

- Monorail Silver: June 30, 2019
- Monorail Green: October 2, 2019, repainted July 2023
- Monorail Black: December 6, 2019, repainted December 2022
- Monorail Peach: July 14, 2020, repainted April 2024
- Monorail Blue: October 29, 2020
- Monorail Red: February 12, 2021
- Monorail Orange: May 17, 2021
- Monorail Gold: August 15, 2021, repainted December 2024
- Monorail Coral: October 21, 2021
- Monorail Yellow: December 15, 2021
- Monorail Teal: May 28, 2022
- Monorail Lime: August 11, 2022

=== Pre-recorded announcements ===
The monorail system uses a set of pre-recorded announcements to instruct and entertain passengers. Prior to departure when the pilot closes the doors, an announcement asks guests to "Please stand clear of the doors. Por favor manténganse alejado de las puertas." One of the most well-known phrases within the resort was recorded by Jack Wagner who was known as "the Voice of Disneyland." During the system's early years, the trains featured Wagner's narration of the sights and scenery along the way, as well as information on special events, the resort, and the monorail system itself. Although his narration has since been replaced, Wagner can still be heard today as the "Please stand clear of the doors" phrase remains with his voice, partly because it is installed on a separate system.

In 1988 following the construction of the Grand Floridian Resort stop, Kevin Miles replaced Jack Wagner as the voiceover. Miles worked in Epcot as part of the 'Voices of Liberty' in the American Adventure pavilion at World Showcase. Sometime before 1998, Disney employee Matt Hanson replaced Kevin Miles, and in 2004 Hanson's recordings were replaced by Joe Hursh. On April 13, 2012, at around 5:00 EDT, Disney activated a version of the monorail narration that features Tom Kane.

On August 25, 2026, Disney activated an updated version of the narration on the Express Monorail. Updates include referring to "Monorail Cast Members" as opposed to "Monorail Hosts & Hostesses", as well as "No smoking or vaping" updated from "No smoking" only. On August 26, 2026, it was confirmed that all monorail lines received the voiceover update. The Epcot monorail line features a snippet of audio from Walt Disney talking about Epcot. The Epcot spiel removes references to Future World and the "upcoming" experiences originally announced at the D23 Expo in 2019, as well as canceled attractions that never opened such as the Play! Pavilion. It also now showcases the existing experiences (e.g. 'Guardians of the Galaxy: Cosmic Rewind', World Nature, etc.) No voiceover artist has been identified at this time.

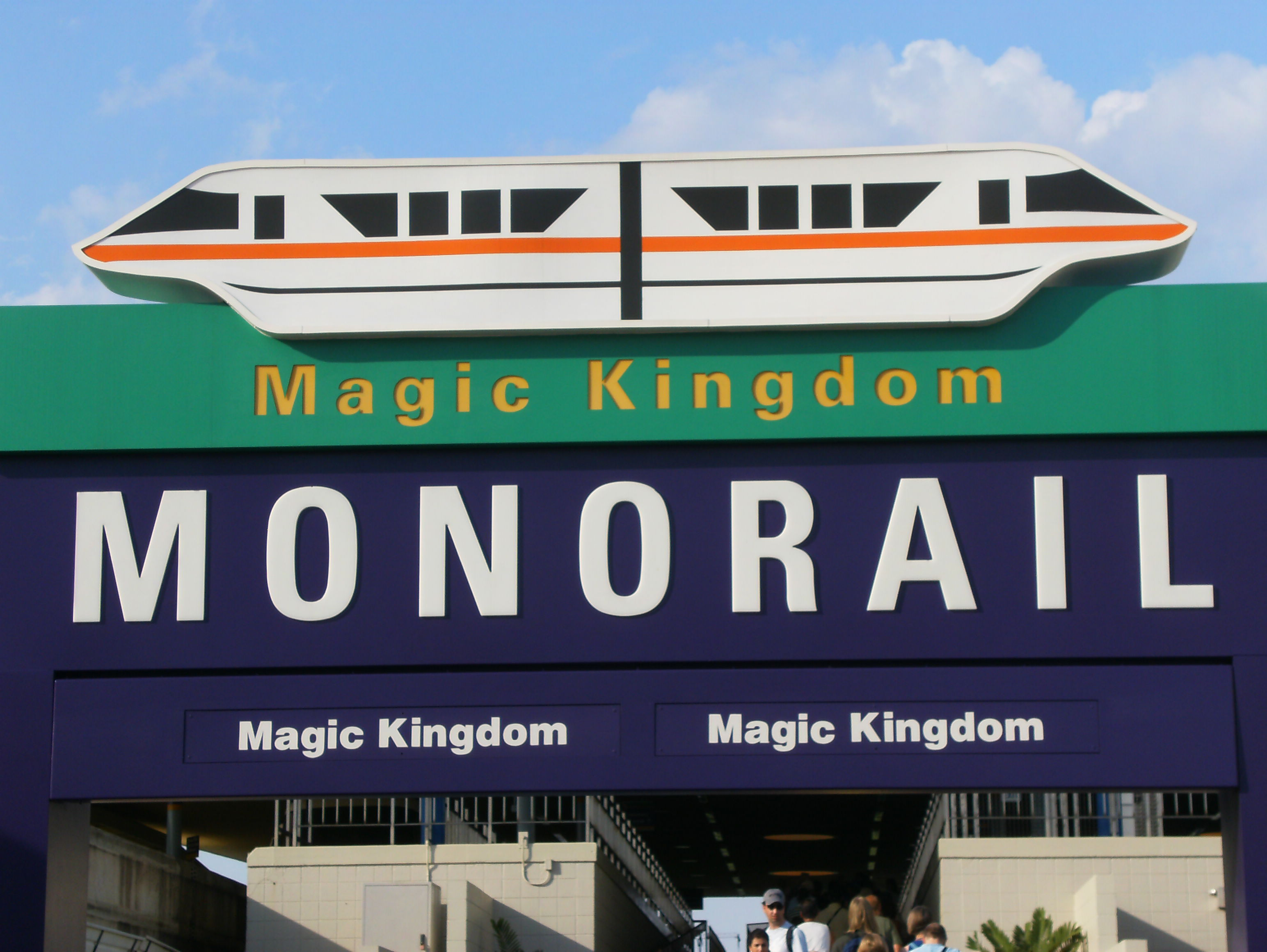
Entrance to the express TTC platform

The complete list of voiceover talents that voiced the Walt Disney World Monorail:

- Jack Wagner: 1971–1988
- Kevin Miles: 1988–1996
- Matt Hanson: 1996–2004
- Joe Hursh: 2004–2012
- Tom Kane: 2012–2026
- Unknown: 2026–present

== Maintenance ==
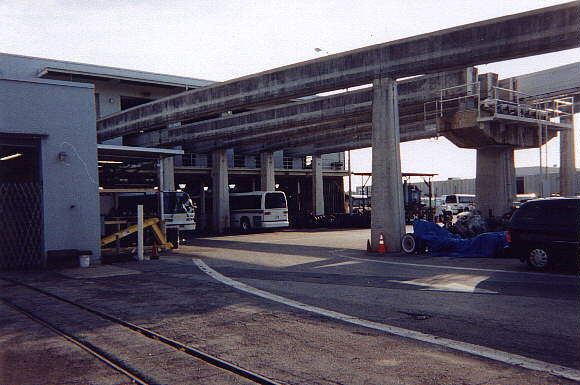
Monorail Shop (roundhouse)

Monorail Shop ("Shop" for short) is Disney's monorail maintenance facility located a short distance northeast of the Magic Kingdom, and provides space for up to ten of the twelve Mark VI trains on its upper level, while the bottom level houses the four steam locomotives and passenger cars of the Walt Disney World Railroad in the Magic Kingdom on its west side, and a road vehicle maintenance facility on the east side. On any given night, two to five monorail trains are parked at various stations on the system. On nights where the temperature drops below freezing, two trains will be parked inside the Contemporary Resort; but in practice, trains can be left in any station (even on the express side of a resort station). Trains typically only spend one night out of shop, since routine maintenance is performed nightly. During busy seasons, some trains may be in service for over 24 hours at a time.

The Monorail Shop also has a painting room located on Beam 10 that is elevated 25 feet (7.6 m) off the ground and has a lift mounted on the wall for the painters. It takes anywhere between three and six weeks to paint a monorail train. To access the wheels and underside of the monorail, a portion of Beam 1 inside Shop is removable, primarily used to change load tires.

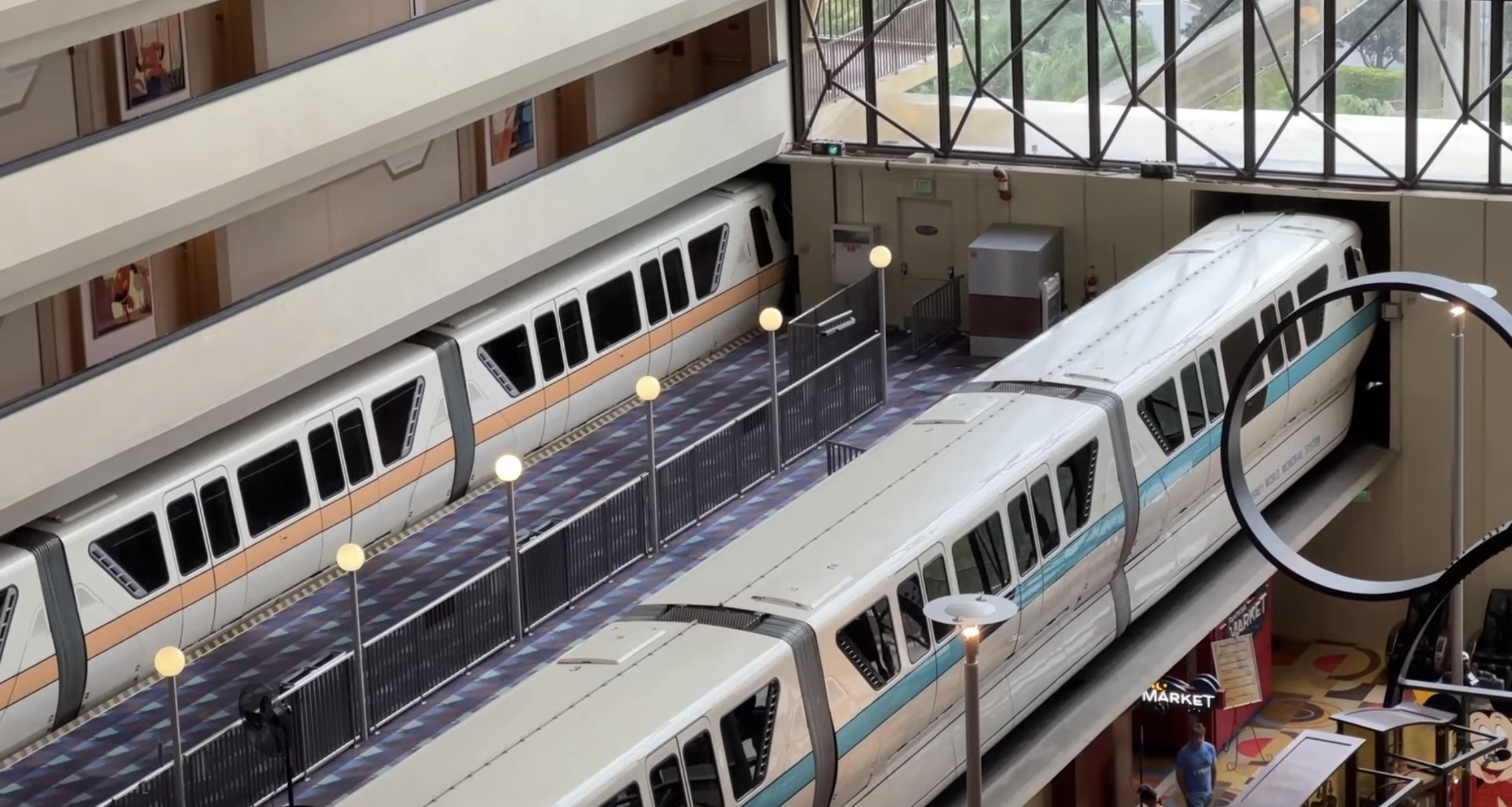
Monorails Teal and Peach parked in the Contemporary Resort for Hurricane Ian.

=== Severe Weather Protocol ===
On nights before hurricanes and other severe weather events are predicted to affect the Walt Disney World Resort, three monorails and two service tractors will be left out on the system in case issues occur as a result of the weather. Two trains and a work tractor will be parked inside the Contemporary Resort with the storm doors closed. One train will be parked at Epcot and the work tractor normally stationed on the Epcot Spur will be parked at the Epcot platform of the Transportation and Ticket Center. This way, if any of the switch beams were to go offline, a maintenance team would be able to fix any issues and there would be at least one monorail to transport guests. Monorail service must cease whenever sustained winds are expected to exceed 39 miles per hour (63 km/h) or greater.

=== Towing ===
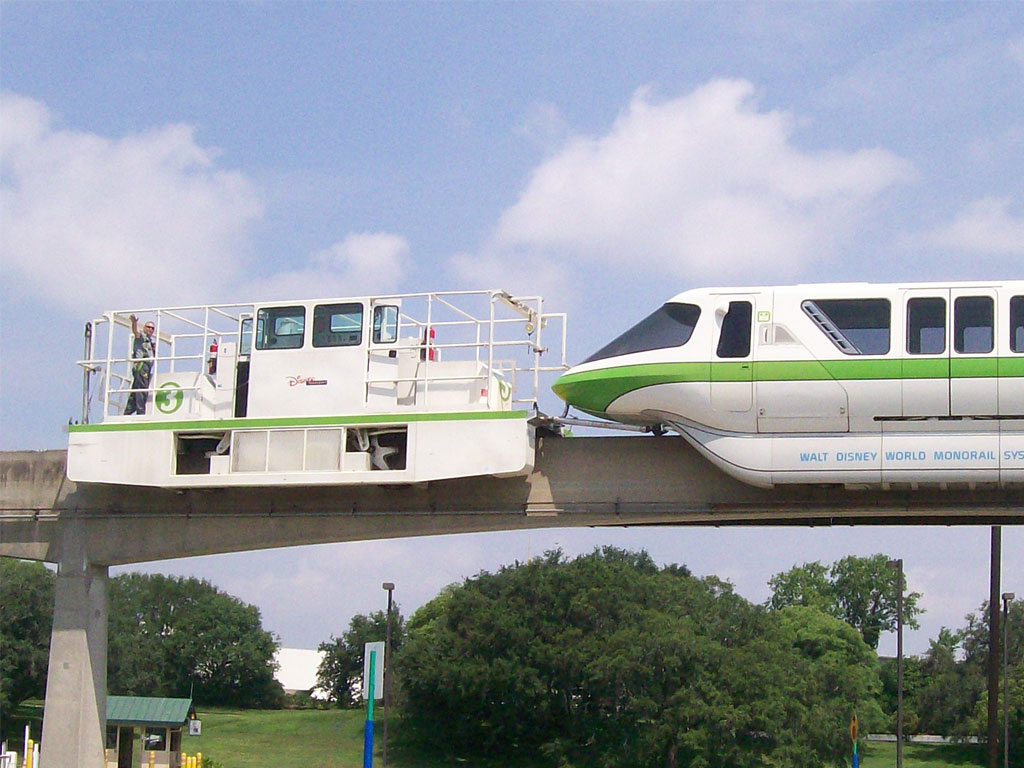
The Green work tractor tows Monorail Green on the maintenance access beam.

The diesel-powered "work tractors" are the tow trucks of the system, and can tow a train to Monorail Shop, located around the bend from Space Mountain. Monorail Operations at the Walt Disney World resort has three separate tractors (Red, tagged '1'; Blue, tagged '2'; and Green, tagged '3') that allow for the simultaneous towing of three different monorails. In the event of a power failure on one of the monorail lines, the tractors are still operational, as they are powered by on-board diesel engines. When not in use, two of the work tractors will usually be parked at the shed while the third is parked on a small 62 foot (19 m) maintenance spur approximately 1,300 feet (400 m) along the Epcot beam from the Transportation and Ticket Center to allow for faster access to any issues on that part of the system.

== Safety ==
=== Train safety ===
Safe train spacing is maintained via a moving blocklight system, referred to as MAPO, installed in the cab of each train. MAPO appears in the top center of the pilot's console and looks similar to a horizontal stop light. There are three lights—green, amber, and red—and a push-button labeled "Override". The term "MAPO" itself comes directly from Walt Disney, who formed a new company to deal with Disneyland's transportation system directly from the profits made by Mary Poppins.

Each monorail beam is divided into blocks based upon pylon numbering. The currently illuminated MAPO color indicates how far ahead the leading train is currently located. A green MAPO shows that the leading train is three or more blocks ahead, amber means two blocks ahead, and red indicates that the next train is in the very next block. A block is roughly between 500 and 1000 feet (about 150 and 300 m) long, although this varies. The start of each block is called a "hold point", as pilots may need to hold their trains at that location until the train ahead moves away. Guests riding in the front cab of a monorail can identify hold points by the yellow reflective tape around a pylon's number and by two yellow reflectors attached to the top outside edges of the monorail beam at that pylon.

For safety, trains must be kept at least two blocks apart during normal operation. A red MAPO indicates that train spacing has become unsafe. When a red MAPO occurs, the train's on-board computer locks out the pilot's propulsion control and applies emergency brakes. The pilot cannot resume control of the train until either the MAPO clears or the pilot presses and holds the MAPO override button.

It is the pilot's responsibility to avoid a red MAPO during normal operation. When the MAPO switches from green to amber, this indicates that the monorail is approaching the train ahead. The pilot must stop the train before crossing into the next block of beam way and hence before the MAPO switches to red. Should a pilot cross the hold point and receive a red MAPO, this counts as a safety demerit against the pilot. If a pilot accumulates three demerits on his/her record within a two-year period, then they will be transferred out of the monorails department and into a different role at Walt Disney World.

Safety tests are performed daily to ensure that the MAPO system is working properly on each train. At the direction of the monorail station conducting the test, each train will intentionally overrun a hold point to verify that a red MAPO occurs and that the emergency brakes activate. Pilots perform tests in forward and reverse when bringing a train onto the system for the first time that day. The indications are called into Monorail Central with the emergency brake pressures.

A red MAPO will also occur when the pilot approaches a section of un-powered beam, a spur line, or a switch beam thrown in the direction of a spur line. Pilots must engage the MAPO override when moving trains through a switch to the spur line. Red MAPOs occurring due to safety tests, switching, or beam power loss do not count as demerits against the pilot.

=== COVID-19 precautions ===
During the COVID-19 pandemic, Walt Disney World installed plastic dividers to the monorail to isolate guests from potential exposure to COVID-19 and to safely increase monorail capacity. The dividers were placed into four sections capable of sitting about two adults. The plastic was made up of material that was modified to fit onto the existing handrails with zip-ties.

=== Emergency evacuation ===
Emergencies requiring train evacuation will be handled differently depending upon the location of the train and the nature of the emergency.

If a train is stopped at a station platform or at the work platform along the Epcot beam, guests can exit the train onto the platform. Exiting a train is possible even when the doors of the train cars are closed. The large rectangular window in the middle of each car is an emergency exit and can be removed from the interior of the car. A cast member outside the car can also manually open the rightmost door panel of the car by releasing the air pressure holding that panel closed. The air pressure release is a handle beneath the rectangular center window that is similar in appearance to a car door handle.

If a train is stopped on an open beam, then guests evacuate through emergency exits located in the roof of the train. Guests open roof hatches by first removing decorative plastic from the ceiling above a bulkhead footstool and then by lifting open a hinged hatch that will flip across the bulkhead dividing two train cars. Guests evacuate to the roof by climbing through the open hatch onto the top of the train. The bulkheads separating cars are designed as firewalls that will contain a fire within a car to just that car. The open hatch allows guests in the affected car to transfer to an adjacent car where they can safely wait for evacuation by fire response crews.

If the emergency affects the entire train, then guests are evacuated to the surface of the beam. Guests again open the emergency roof hatches, but do not simply move to the adjacent car. Instead, they use a small handrail present along the top of each train car to move all the way to the front of the train. The train's pilot can attach a knotted rope to both the top and the base of the windscreen, and guests use the rope to shimmy down the windscreen to the surface of the beam. They finally start walking along the beam away from the train.

Reedy Creek Emergency Services provides fire response and rescue for the Walt Disney World Monorail System and maintains an all-wheel-drive fire truck specially designed for monorail rescue.

=== Security checks ===
Since April 2017, bag searches and walk through metal detector checks have been systematically performed on guests before they board the monorail, including at the Transportation and Ticket Center and the three resort monorail stops. The security cordon extension was put in place to reduce congestion at the entrance to Magic Kingdom. Until late 2019, guests taking the monorail to Epcot would need to go through security again at the Epcot entrance, but this was eventually fixed in late 2019 by the relocation of Epcot's main entrance checkpoints.

=== Platform safety ===
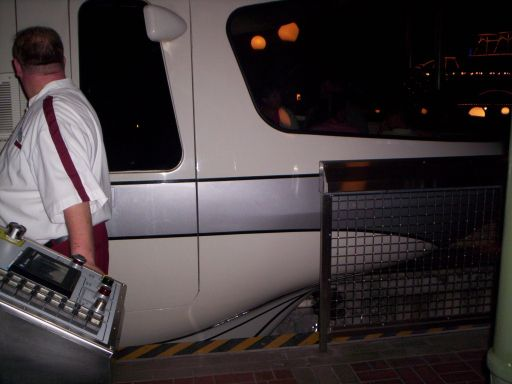
Platform controls at Magic Kingdom Station.

The Express station at the Transportation and Ticket Center, and both stations at the Magic Kingdom have remotely opened or automated gates that bar riders from approaching the guideway (and, thus, any approaching or departing train) until the operators have determined that it is safe to allow people to board the train. The cast member at the station gives the riders instructions on how to board. The other stations have manually operated gates to serve this function.

All platforms are ADA-accessible. Because the train level is higher than the platform level, a portable ramp must be used to load and unload guests with disabilities at all stations. For many years, the Contemporary Resort station did not have ADA access, but an elevator has since been added to the platform.

=== State oversight ===
As part of legislation passed in 2023, the Florida Department of Transportation (FDOT) is tasked with certain oversight and regulatory tasks. The department works with Disney staff to ensure proper maintenance and safety of the monorail system through routine inspections as dictated by state law.

=== Incidents ===
There has been one fatal incident in the history of the Walt Disney World Monorail System. On July 5, 2009, an operator was killed when Monorail Pink and Monorail Purple collided on the Epcot line near the Transportation and Ticket Center. The National Transportation Safety Board (NTSB) found that the collision was caused by an employee's failure to properly position a switch-beam and the monorail manager's failure to verify the switch before authorizing Monorail Pink's reverse movement. Contributing factors included the resort’s lack of standard operating procedures for reversing trains. Before the incident, up to four guests could ride in the operator’s cabin; following the accident, passengers are no longer permitted.

== See also ==
- Disney Resort Line (monorail system at Tokyo Disney Resort)
- Disneyland Resort line (mass transit rail system at Hong Kong Disneyland Resort)
- List of incidents at Walt Disney World § Monorail
- List of monorail systems
- Rail transport in Walt Disney Parks and Resorts
