= Disney's Contemporary Resort =

Hotel at Walt Disney World

Coordinates: 28.415°N 81.574°W

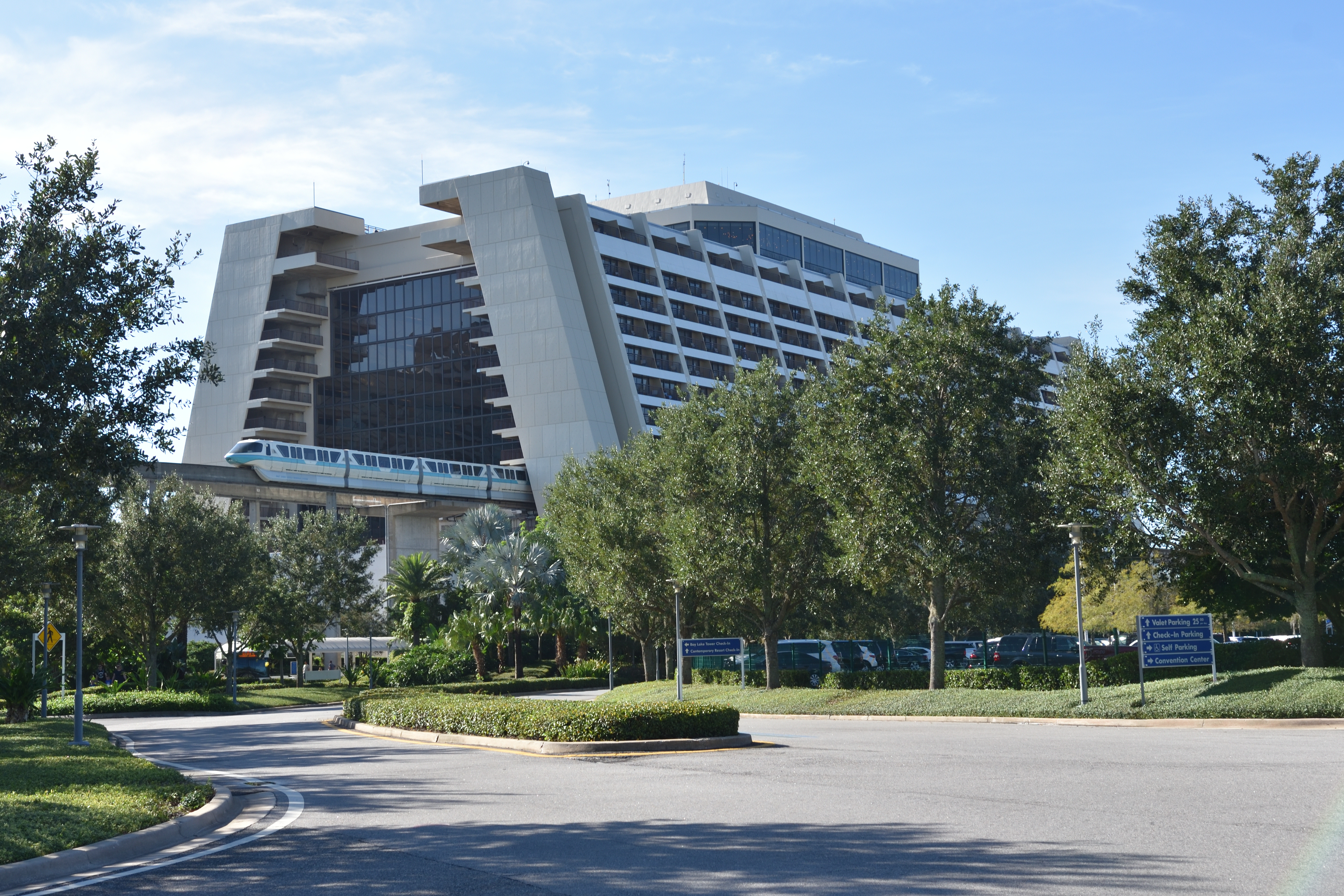
- The monorail runs through the interior of the resort

General information
- Type: Resort
- Location: Magic Kingdom Resort Area
- Opened: October 1, 1971

Other information
- Number of rooms: 655

Disney's Contemporary Resort, originally to be named Tempo Bay Hotel and previously the Contemporary Resort Hotel, is a resort located at the Walt Disney World Resort in Bay Lake, Florida. Opened on October 1, 1971, the hotel is one of two original properties located at the complex alongside Disney's Polynesian Village Resort, and is listed as a deluxe-priced resort. It is adjacent to Magic Kingdom Park, and is identified by its A-frame main building.

== History ==
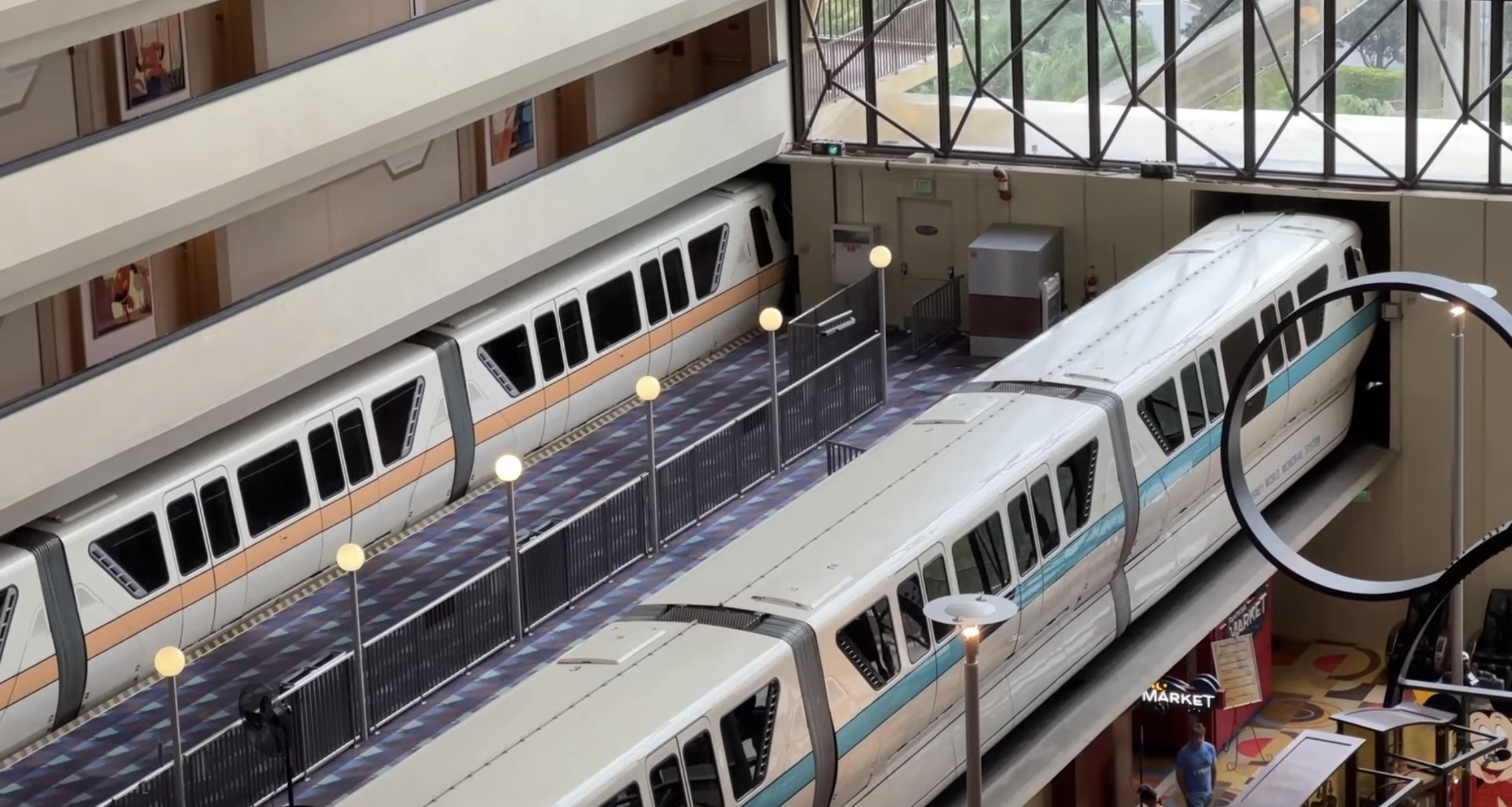
Two monorail trains parked inside Contemporary during Hurricane Ian, 2022

Disney's Contemporary Resort is one of two resorts located on property when Walt Disney World opened in 1971.

The tower at Contemporary, the most prominent of the resort's three stand-alone buildings, was built as an A-frame with outer walls which slope inwards around an inner atrium. This design was a collaboration by Disney, the United States Steel Corporation, and Xerox Tower architect Welton Becket. To construct the building, steel frames were erected on-site and modular pre-constructed rooms, designed by California architect Donald Wexler, were lifted into place by crane. The original buildings at Disney's Polynesian Village Resort, the Court of Flags Resort and one residential property at Bay Hill (using the first four units off the assembly lines) were all built the same way, except these rooms were stacked instead of slid in.

In 2006, Disney filed plans for a project on the site of Contemporary's North Garden Wing. Bay Lake Tower ultimately contained 281 timeshare units. In preparation for the future sale, Disney incorporated a condominium association for the property on January 9, 2007, that would manage the units. The project was officially unveiled on September 16, 2008. Timeshares began on September 28, 2008, to existing Disney Vacation Club members and on October 5, 2008, for new members.

In 2005, Disney began an extensive renovation of Contemporary, and it was completed in 2009. As part of the construction, the North Garden Wing of the hotel was demolished to make way for a separate Disney Vacation Club resort that opened in 2009. At the same time, Bay Lake Tower began construction. Disney's Racquet Club was demolished by January 30, 2007, while the North Wing itself was demolished between January 31 and April 6, 2007. Construction on the new building continued through 2007, without Disney announcing what was actually being built. Bay Lake Tower opened in 2009.

=== Richard Nixon's 1973 press conference ===
On November 17, 1973, Contemporary was the site of what would become one of the most famous press conference statements in modern American politics, where President Richard Nixon declared, "I am not a crook." Nixon, whose job approval rating had been declining steadily for over a year due to the on-going Watergate scandal, made the statement during an appearance at the Associated Press Managing Editors Association annual convention, at which he held a live one-hour televised press conference. Following an earlier question on Nixon's taxes, Nixon addressed claims that he profited from his public service, stating "I've earned every cent. And in all of my years of public life I have never obstructed justice ... People have got to know whether or not their President is a crook. Well, I'm not a crook. I've earned everything I've got." Less than one year later, facing almost certain impeachment and removal from office, Nixon announced his resignation in a national speech on August 8, 1974, which became effective the following day.

== Layout ==
=== Main building ===
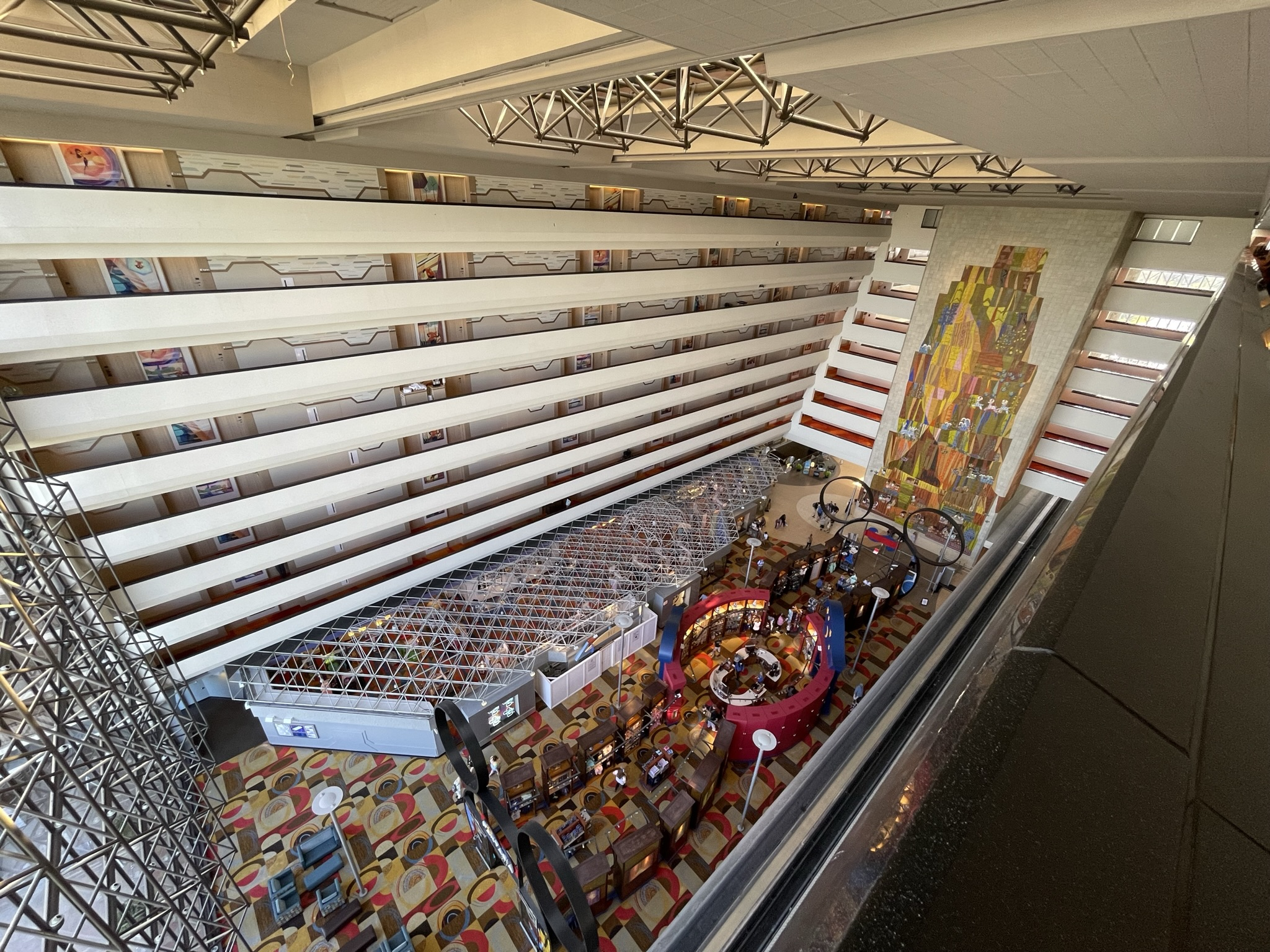
Looking down into Grand Canyon Concourse

==== Rooms and facilities ====
The main tower houses most of the resort's key facilities, including resort registration and the guest service concierge. The main hall, named the Grand Canyon Concourse, is located in main tower and houses restaurants and shops. 383 guest rooms line the outer walls of the tower. The Walt Disney World Monorail System runs through the inside of this building and a monorail station is located here for resort guests. Adorning the concourse walls is a multi-story mosaic designed by Mary Blair. One three-story wing flanks the south side of the tower and houses an additional 250 rooms. A convention center was added to the resort and opened on November 11, 1991, with more than 90,000 square feet (8,400 m^{2}) of convention space. In October 2007, the resort received designation as part of the Florida Green Lodging Program.

In June 2021, Disney Parks Blog announced the rooms had undergone a redesign blending monorail motifs with Incredibles characters.

==== Dining ====
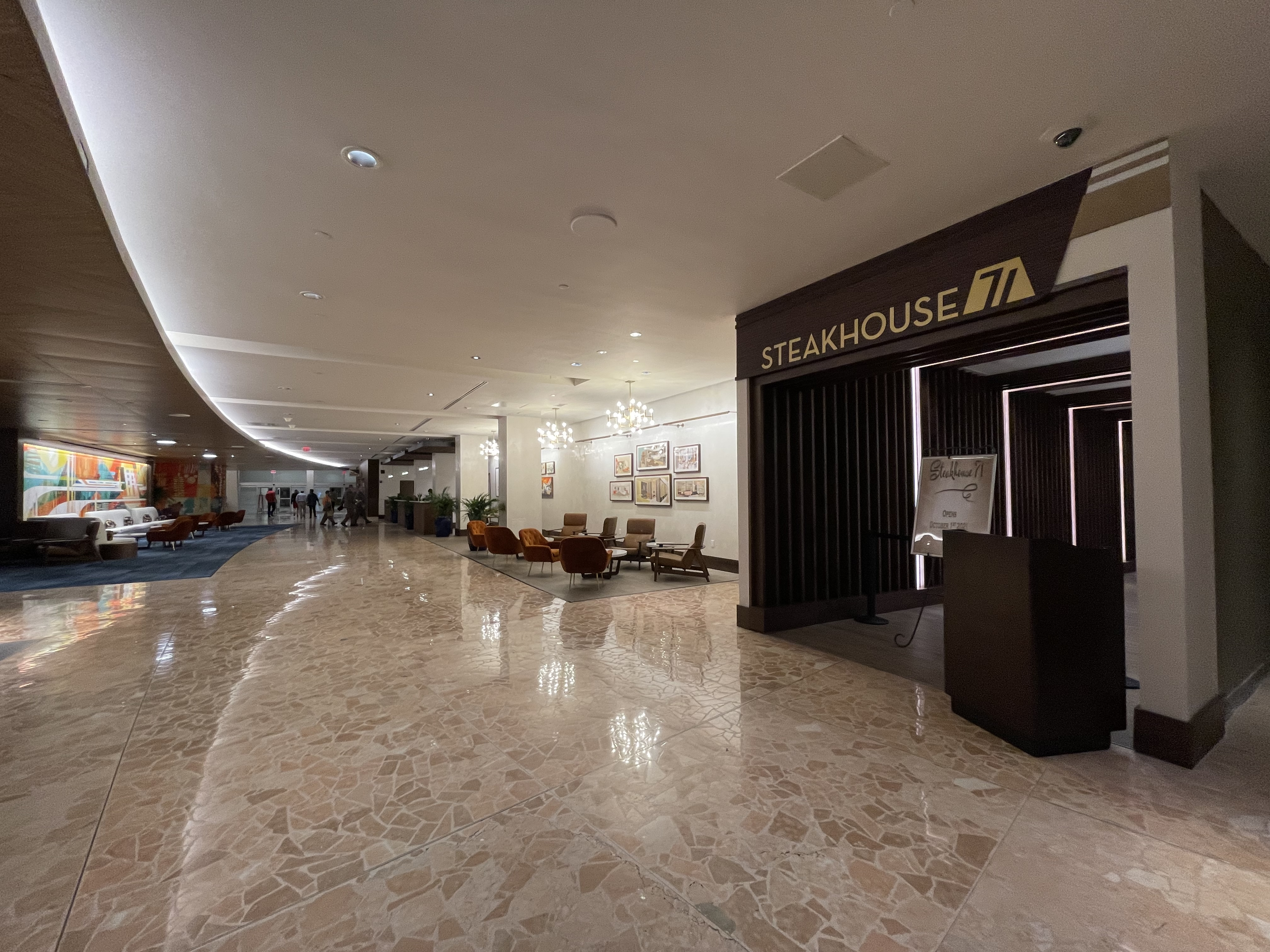
Steakhouse 71, a 2021 addition to the resort and replacement of The Wave… of American Flavors

There are several restaurants in Contemporary's main building. California Grill is a full-service dining restaurant located at the top (15th floor) of Contemporary's tower, formerly Top of the World Lounge. A second full-service restaurant, Steakhouse 71, is located on the first floor of the main tower in a space formerly occupied by The Wave... of American Flavors and, before that, the Fiesta Fun Center arcade. Its theming and name are both inspired by the resort's opening year, 1971. Two restaurants, a character buffet (Chef Mickey's) and a quick-service facility (Contempo Café), are located on the Grand Canyon Concourse in the tower's atrium, with coffee bars and lounges located throughout the resort complex.

=== Bay Lake Tower ===
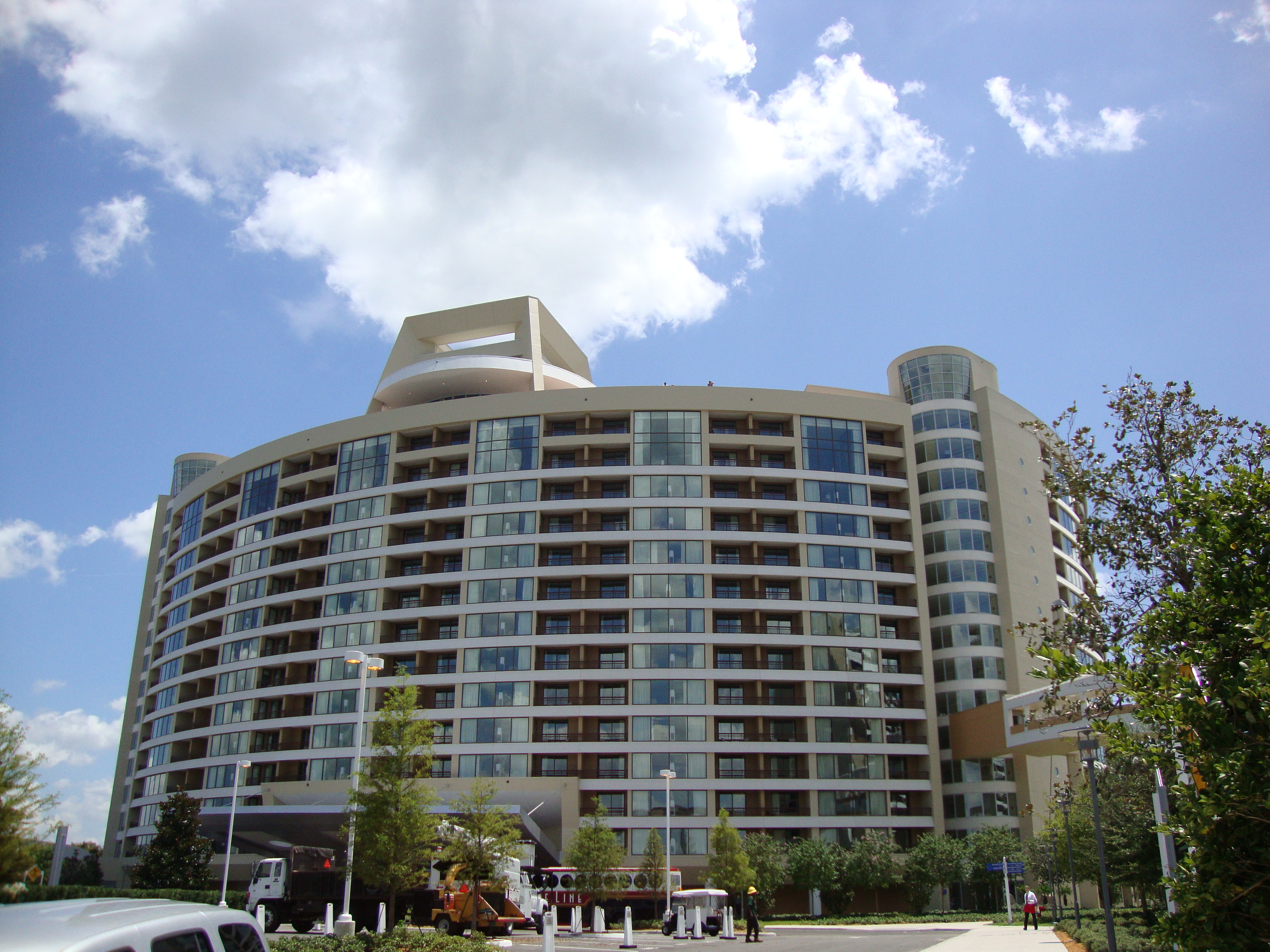
Exterior of Bay Lake Tower

Bay Lake Tower at Disney's Contemporary Resort, part of Disney Vacation Club, is a 15-story addition that officially opened on August 4, 2009. It is located on the former location of the demolished North Garden Wing rooms. The tower shares design features with the original resort. The front desk, concierge, valet, bell services and transportation are shared services provided through the main resort. Bay Lake Tower has a concierge desk and an online check-in desk of their own for guests who wish to check into Bay Lake Tower directly. Its fifth floor is connected by a skyway from the main tower's fourth floor.

The units were among the most expensive offered by Disney Vacation Club at initial offering, presumably because of their proximity to Magic Kingdom. Some of the resort's features include full-length windows with views into Magic Kingdom or onto Bay Lake. Some bathrooms on Magic Kingdom side include movable partitions to permit watching the park's fireworks displays from the bathtub.

== Incidents ==
- On November 12, 1992, an off-duty Cast Member fell off the ledge outside Top of The World Lounge on the 15th floor of Contemporary. The cast member had been sitting on the ledge when a swarm of wasps appeared; while trying to swat the wasps away, the cast member lost his balance and fell to his death 11 stories below.
- On March 22, 2016, a person died at Disney's Contemporary Resort. According to multiple sources, the person jumped to their death inside the central A-frame tower.
- On May 28, 2018, an intoxicated man was arrested at Disney's Contemporary Resort after he falsely told other guests an active shooter was in the resort. Panic soon followed and the resort was placed on lockdown until police could arrive. The reports were traced back to the man, who was found hiding in bushes outside of the resort. When questioned, the man claimed that his motive was to get reactions from people for a class and his YouTube channel.

Preceding station	Walt Disney World Monorail System	Following station
Magic Kingdom Park One-way operation	Resort Line	Transportation and Ticket Center Next clockwise
