= Disney's Polynesian Village Resort =

Hotel at Walt Disney World

Coordinates: 28.4057°N 81.5843°W

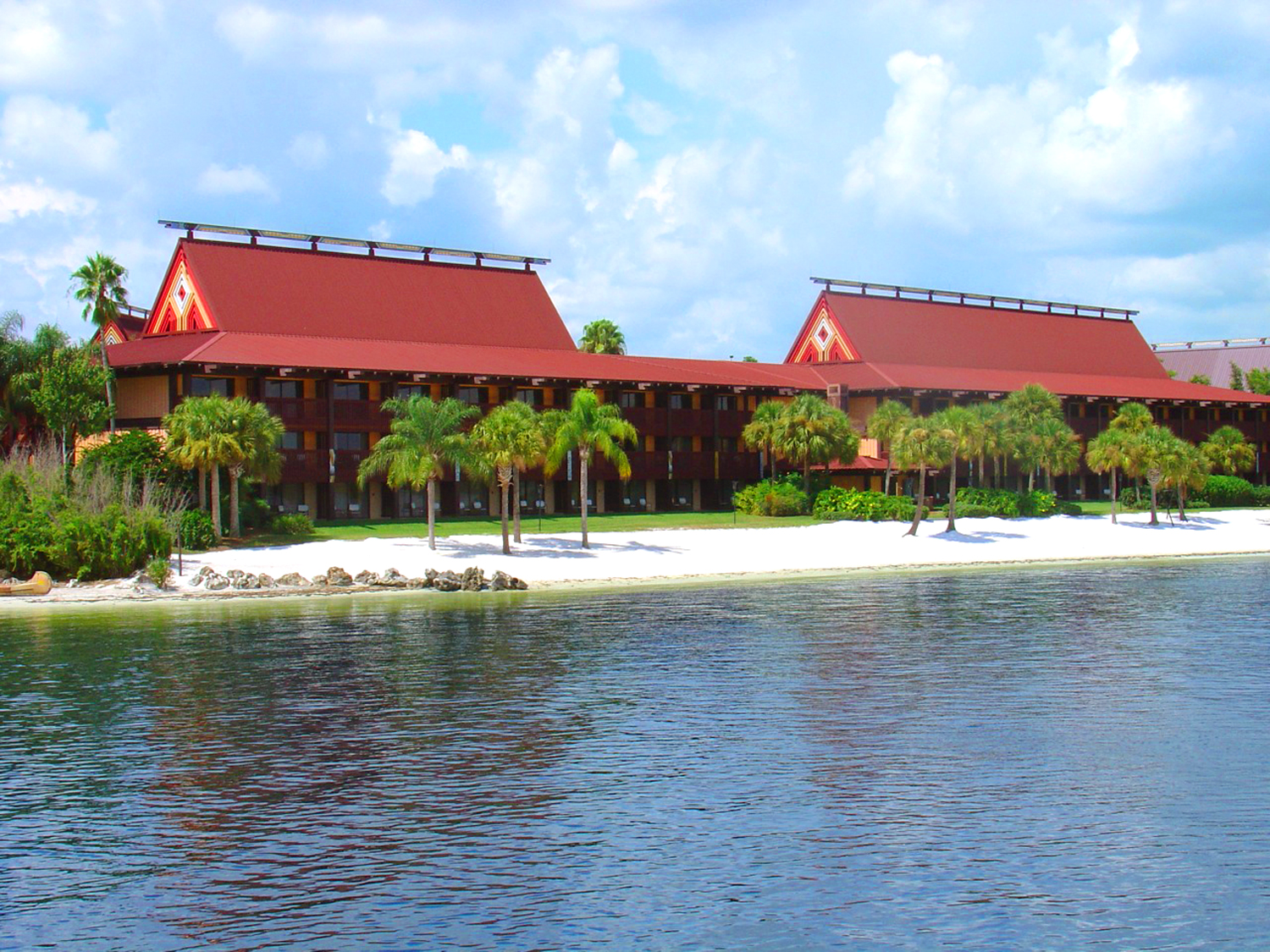
- There are several longhouses, such as the Tahiti Longhouse viewed here from the Seven Seas Lagoon, which house all of the resort's rooms.
- Interactive map of the Disney's Polynesian Village Resort area

General information
- Type: Resort
- Location: Magic Kingdom Resort Area
- Opened: October 1, 1971

Other information
- Number of rooms: 492

Website
- Official website

Disney's Polynesian Village Resort (formerly Disney's Polynesian Resort from 1985 to 2014) is a Disney-owned and operated resort located at the Walt Disney World Resort in Bay Lake, Florida. It began operation on October 1, 1971 as one of Walt Disney World Resort's first two on-site hotels. The resort has a South Seas theme, and originally opened with 492 rooms. It was designed by Welton Becket and Associates and constructed by US Steel Realty Development. The resort is owned and operated by Disney Parks, Experiences and Products.

Since its opening in 1971, the resort has seen three major expansions; the first in 1978, with the addition of a longhouse, the Tangaroa Terrace restaurant/support facility, and a secondary pool. A second expansion took place in 1985, with the construction of two additional longhouses. In that same year, the resort adopted the shortened name "Disney's Polynesian Resort". On May 2, 2014, it was announced that the resort would revert to the Disney's Polynesian Village Resort title while expanding further to include Disney Vacation Club (DVC) accommodations as well as enhanced resort amenities. On April 1, 2015, the third expansion officially opened, including the new DVC additions and other amenities around the resort. However, on May 10, 2024, Disney Vacation Club announced new details about a new name, Island Tower at Disney’s Polynesian Villas & Bungalows, which opened on December 17, 2024.

== Design ==
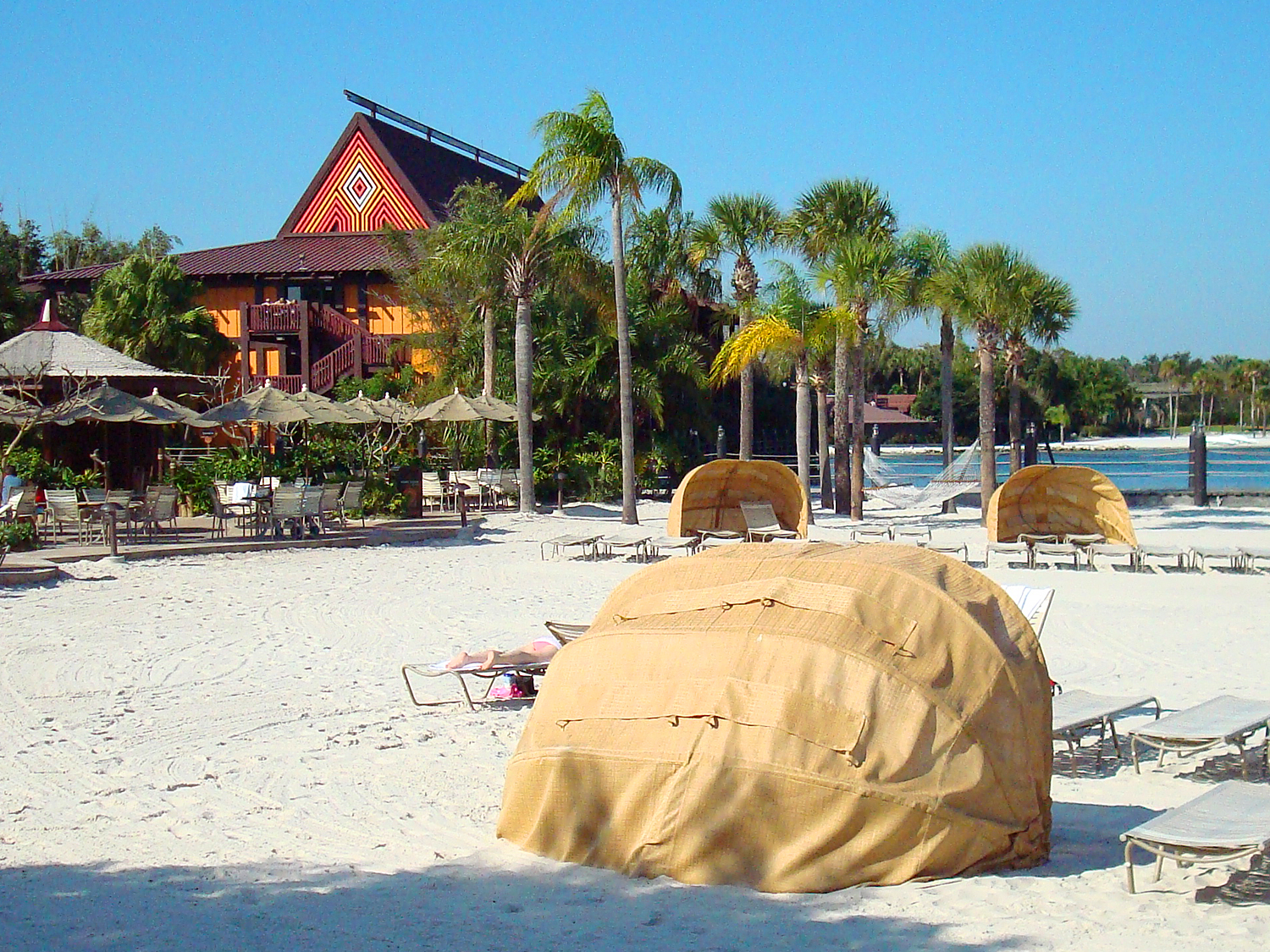
A white sand beach off Disney's Polynesian Village Resort, with the Tuvalu Longhouse in view

Disney's Polynesian Village Resort is situated on the southern shore of the manmade Seven Seas Lagoon, south of Magic Kingdom and adjacent to other Walt Disney World complexes, with the Transportation and Ticket Center to the east and Disney's Grand Floridian Resort & Spa to the west. The resort is on the Magic Kingdom monorail loop, providing transportation to Magic Kingdom and Epcot (via transfer), and is part of the route for Disney's Magic Kingdom Resorts Water Launch service. Other Walt Disney World Resort theme parks and attractions are served by Disney Transport buses.

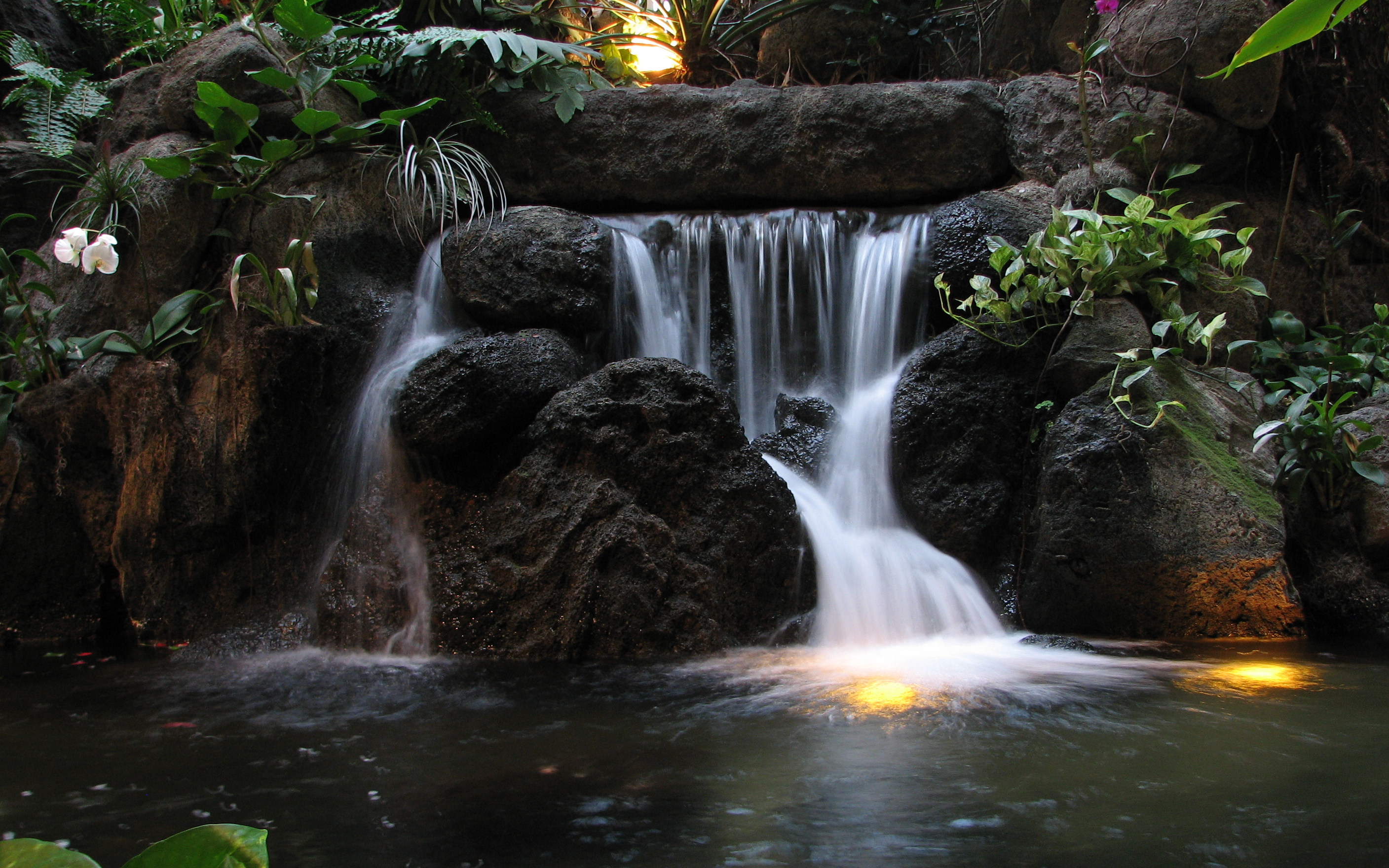
The Great Ceremonial House featured a large "tropical rainforest" in its atrium with waterfalls until 2014.

The resort is organized around a central building named the Great Ceremonial House, itself designed after a Tahitian royal assembly lodge. The Great Ceremonial House houses guest services and most of the resort's dining and merchandise locations. From its opening until 2014, the Great Ceremonial House also featured an expansive tropical waterfall feature in its atrium, with over 75 species of plant life. The waterfall and foliage were removed and replaced, however, during extensive resort renovations due to health and safety concerns and to reimagine the lobby as a social space. No rooms are contained in this building, instead several lodges - longhouses - and water bungalows house all guest rooms and are spread out amongst resort property.

As of 2008, Disney's Polynesian Village Resort is certified green lodging property with the state of Florida.

=== Original design and construction ===
The resort used United States Steel's then newly developed construction process for its original longhouses; steel frames were erected on-site, and pre-constructed modular rooms were lifted into these frames via crane, similar to Disney's Contemporary Resort. This method of building caused problems in both Disney's Polynesian and Contemporary Resorts, with guest complaints of a moldy smell in their rooms. It was found that mold and debris had collected in the spaces between each room. The spaces were filled in, stopping the problem, and longhouses built as part of the resort's later expansions were built using conventional building techniques.

=== Accommodations ===
The resort design and layout consists of 11 two- and three-story longhouses, spread throughout the property. The resort originally opened with 484 guest rooms in 8 longhouses: Bali Hai, Bora Bora, Fiji, Hawaii, Maui, Samoa, Tahiti and Tonga. In 1978, the Oahu longhouse was added. The Moorea and Pago Pago longhouses were added in 1985. Between 2013 and 2015, 20 over-the-water DVC bungalows were constructed in a new area named Bora Bora.

On October 28, 1999, most of the resort's longhouses were renamed. Today the longhouses are named for islands on the Polynesian isle map, with chosen longhouse names matching the relative geographic position of their namesake island(s). Ten of the eleven longhouses, excluding Fiji, were renamed: Bali Hai became Tonga; Bora Bora became Niue; Hawaii became Samoa; Maui became Rarotonga; Moorea became Tahiti; Oahu became Tokelau; Pago Pago became Rapa Nui; Samoa became Tuvalu; Tahiti became Aotearoa and Tonga became Hawaii. The 2013-15 resort reimagining has returned the original names of the DVC longhouses.

Two of the current longhouses, Hawaii (formerly Tonga) and Tonga (formerly Bali Hai), offer a Concierge Lounge - where refreshments, views, and lounge space are offered exclusively to guests of Hawaii or Tonga.

In March 2021, Disney Parks Blog revealed updated rooms with new furnishings, fixtures, and Moana themed details, patterns, textures, and colors. In March 2022, it was announced that the resort's luau show, the "Spirit of Aloha Dinner Show", would not be returning after closing two years earlier due to the COVID-19 pandemic; the closure was due to anticipated expansions for the Disney Vacation Club, including new villas, as Island Tower at Disney’s Polynesian Villas & Bungalows and amenities which opened on December 17, 2024.

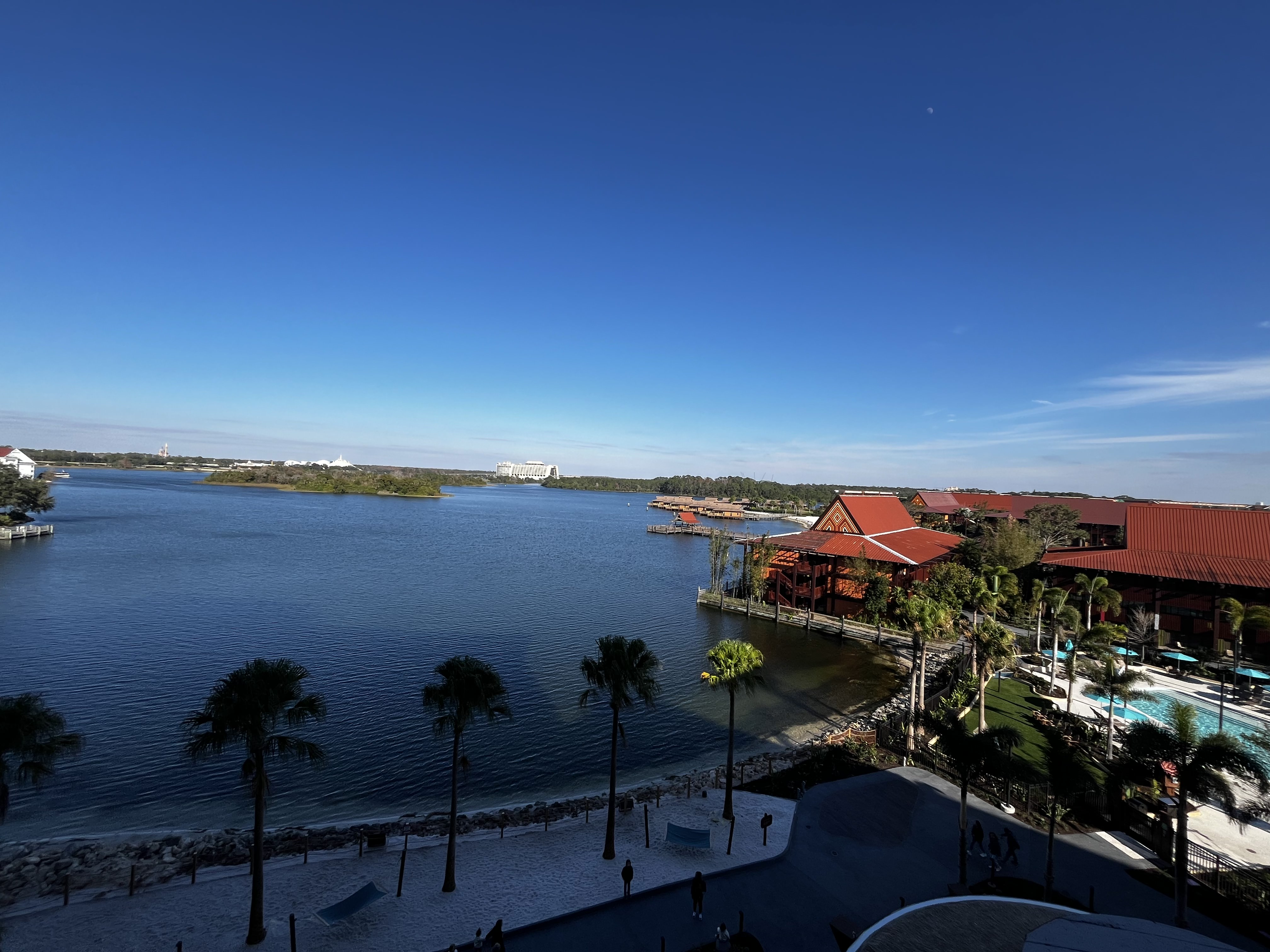
View of Seven Seas Lagoon from Island Tower terrace

== Dining ==
The Barefoot Pool Bar is located at the Lava Pool and offers alcoholic drinks and smoothies.

Captain Cook's is a quick-service location offering classic and South-Seas-inspired foods.

Kona Cafe offers continental Asian-inspired food in a casual setting.

Kona Island serves coffee and pastries in the morning before switching to sushi, sandwiches, and salad in the afternoon.

Oasis Pool Bar & Grill is a poolside bar located at the Oasis Pool.

ʻOhana is a character dining experience where guests can meet Stitch, Lilo, Pluto, and Mickey while being served an "all-you-care-to-enjoy" Island-style meal. The restaurant, whose name means "family" in Hawaiian, has existed before the development of Lilo & Stitch (2002), having been mentioned in The Walt Disney World Explorer (1996).

Pineapple Lanai is a stand dedicated solely to Dole Whips.

Tambu Lounge is a bar offering tropical, Hawaiian-inspired drinks and appetizers.

Trader Sam's features the "Grog Grotto," a tiki bar that features shenanigans from the servers, and the "Tiki Terrace," its outdoor counterpart.

== Shopping ==
The resort offers several shopping areas focused on Disney parks merchandise, resort-specific specialty merchandise, and convenience items, located in the Great Ceremonial House. BouTiki is located off the main lobby, with Moana Mercantile located opposite Kona Cafe on the second floor. Trader Sam's Grog Grotto also offers a limited range of merchandise.

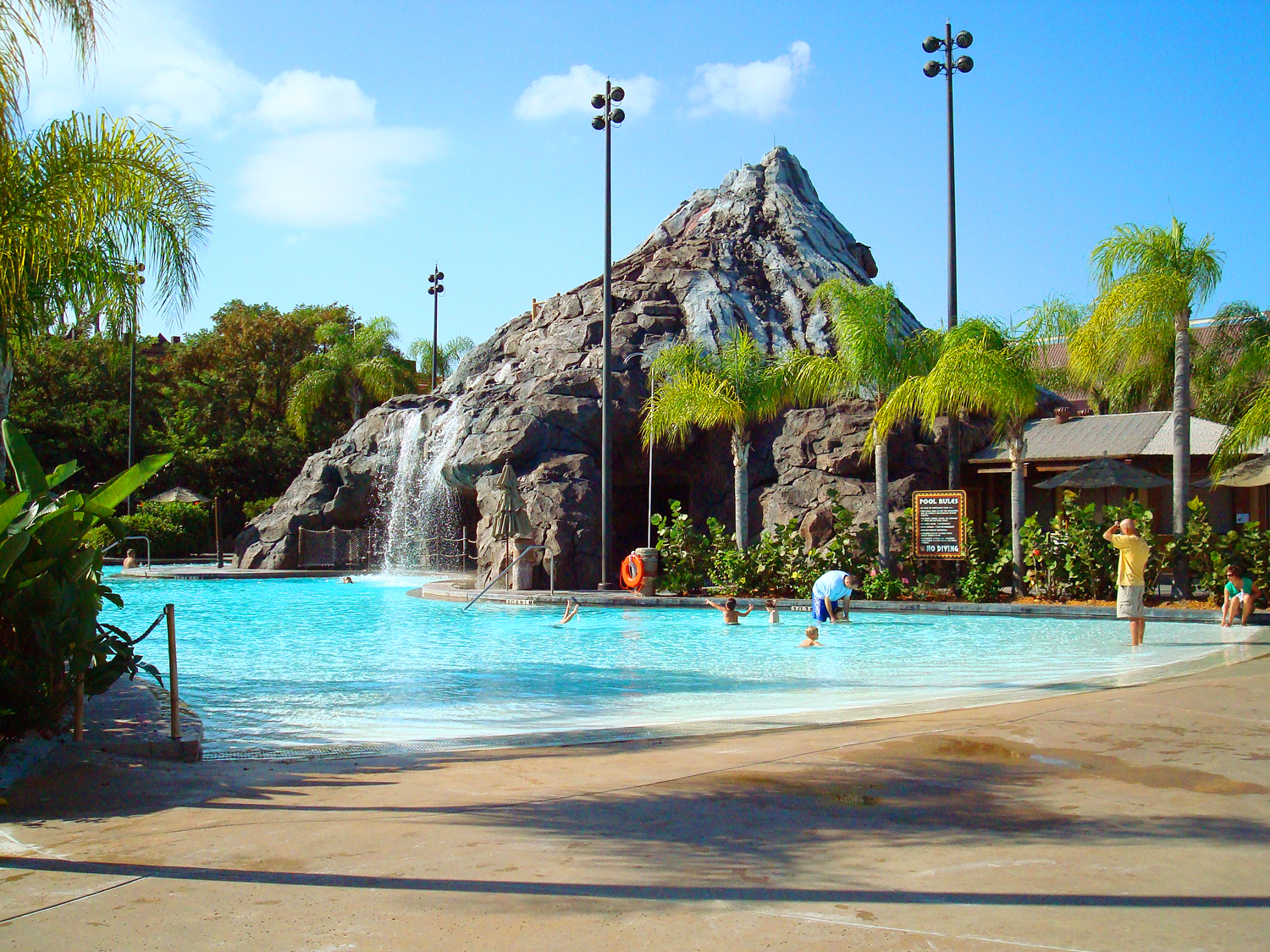
The Lava Pool is the resort's main themed pool, featuring zero-entry, a water slide and water play area.

== Disney's Polynesian Villas & Bungalows ==
On September 17, 2013, Disney Vacation Club announced that its next planned location would be at Disney’s Polynesian Village Resort. The first phase of DVC expansion to the resort opened April 1, 2015, adding 20 over-the-water 'Bora Bora' Bungalows and converting 2 existing buildings (Moorea (formerly Tahiti), Pago Pago (formerly Rapa Nui)) into Deluxe Studios. The Tokelau conversion was completed mid-2015 creating a total of 360 Deluxe Studios between the 3 buildings. Between the three DVC longhouses is a barbecue area for the use of resort guests, with two gas barbecues. In addition there would be 5 new rooms added between the Moorea, Tokelau, and Pago Pago vacation club buildings. On May 10, 2024, it was announced that the name of the new tower would be Island Tower at Disney’s Polynesian Villas & Bungalows, which opened on December 17, 2024.

== Role in ending the Beatles ==
A standard guest room with two queen beds, after the resort's 2006 renovation

John Lennon signed the paperwork that officially broke up the Beatles at Polynesian Resort on December 29, 1974.

John, Julian, and I (May Pang) left New York the following day to spend Christmas in Florida. On December 29, 1974, the voluminous documents were brought down to John in Florida by one of Apple's lawyers. He finally picked up his pen and, in the unlikely backdrop of the Polynesian Village Hotel at Disney World, ended the greatest rock 'n' roll band in history by simply scrawling John Lennon at the bottom of the page.

— May Pang, Instamatic Karma (St. Martins, 2008)

Preceding station	Walt Disney World Monorail System	Following station
Transportation and Ticket Center One-way operation	Resort Line	Disney's Grand Floridian Resort & Spa Next clockwise
