= Jim Lewis (business executive) =

American business executive

James Lewis
- Born: 1961 (age 64–65); Hammond, Indiana
- Education: Indiana State University (BS in Accounting); Purdue University (MBA)

James Lewis (born in 1961) is an American business executive known for his roles at The Walt Disney Company and Walmart. In 2019, he became the president of the 4-R Signature Products and 4-R Foods Divisions at the 4-R Restaurant Group.

== Early life and education ==
James Lewis was born in Hammond, Indiana. He graduated from Indiana State University with a BS in Accounting in 1984. He became a Certified Public Accountant and later earned his MBA from the Krannert School of Management at Purdue University in 1992.

== Career ==
=== Early career ===
In August 1984, Lewis began his first job as an accountant with PricewaterhouseCoopers. While at PWC, Lewis became a Certified Public Accountant. After a short period, PricewaterhouseCoopers promoted James Lewis to senior accountant.

In September 1986, Lewis accepted a job as manager of internal audit for Tokheim Corporation, a multinational company that manufactures fluid movement and measuring devices in Fort Wayne, Indiana.

In November 1988, Lewis became employed by PepsiCo in Indianapolis, Indiana, where he advanced to the position of senior manager of planning and analysis. In April 1993, PepsiCo promoted Lewis to director of investor relations. During his tenure as director, the Consumer Analyst Group of New York ranked PepsiCo's Investor Relations function number one in America.

In December 1994, PepsiCo promoted Lewis to area vice president of the New York, New York regions. In his capacity as area vice president, Lewis developed regional snack food businesses for Frito-Lay as general manager and turnaround specialist. He was responsible for the sales, marketing, distribution, finance, and warehouse functions of the company. He directed an organization of 155 people, including 15 direct reports. In late 1995 Lewis, who was demoted from vice president, was assigned to the Houston North Zone Region as a zone sales manager. He supervised 13 district managers and over 100 route sales representatives. He was moved to the Frito-Lay main office in Houston until he resigned in 1996.

=== Career with the Walt Disney Company ===
Lewis began his Disney career in 1996 as the director of planning and finance for Walt Disney Attractions. He was considered a "rising star" at the time and was a top candidate for the position of president of the Walt Disney World Resort. He was mentored by Disney executive Al Weiss during this period. Lewis progressed to become senior vice president of business development and public affairs for the Walt Disney World Resort. Lewis became the general manager of the Disney Vacation Club (DVC) in November 2003; he was promoted to the position of president in 2006, making him one of the most senior African-Americans in the Disney company.

Lewis led DVC's first international expansion with the development of a 15,000-square-foot (1,400 m^{2}) sales center in Tokyo, Japan. Six of DVC's 12 resorts were designed and built during Lewis' tenure, including Bay Lake Tower, Kidani Village at Disney's Animal Kingdom Lodge, Saratoga Springs Resort and the Treehouse Villas at Saratoga. Saratoga Springs was the company's largest vacation resort at the time.

James Lewis parted ways with Disney in 2011, shortly after Weiss retired. Disney allegedly fired Lewis after it became known that, for over a year, time shares at the Aulani resort in Hawaii had been sold for fees that were less than the cost of actual taxes and maintenance. After his departure, he was replaced by Claire Bilby. However, Lewis was given a consulting role at Disney and a letter of recommendation.

=== After Disney ===
Lewis was hired as a corporate officer at Walmart in 2013, where he served as regional vice president and general manager for North Florida and Central Florida. He left the company in 2015.

=== Later roles ===
In September 2015, he was named chief executive officer of the national, Florida-based company Marilyn Monroe Spas board. He oversaw the company's expansion to India in 2017. In April 2019, he became president of Signature Products and Foods Divisions for 4-R Restaurant Group, which operates fourteen 4 Rivers Smokehouses in Florida and Georgia.

== Legacy ==
In 2007, Lewis was named one of the ten most influential businessmen in Central Florida by the Orlando Business Journal. In 2008, The Steve Harvey Morning Show aired a piece on Lewis, honoring him as an "Influential African American" in the area of business. In April 2009, Lewis was elected Chairman of the American Resort Development Association. He also serves on the board of directors of his church.
