= Disney's Lakeshore Lodge =

Planned hotel at Walt Disney World

Coordinates: 28.4113°N 81.5647°W

General information
- Type: Resort
- Location: Magic Kingdom Resort Area
- Opening: July 1, 2027

Other information
- Number of rooms: 967

Disney's Lakeshore Lodge (formerly Reflections – A Disney Lakeside Lodge) is an upcoming Disney Vacation Club resort at the Walt Disney World Resort in Bay Lake, Florida. It is to be built between Disney's Wilderness Lodge and Disney's Fort Wilderness Resort & Campground. It is to be constructed on the former site of Disney's River Country water park. The rooms will feature artwork and themes celebrating the beauty of nature as seen in classic Disney films including Bambi, Brother Bear, Encanto, Pocahontas, and Fantasia.

A lakeside restaurant featuring the characters from The Princess and the Frog was also slated to open along with the new resort, but it was cancelled to make way for Moonglade as a new table-service restaurant. Other dining options include Bay Lake Provisions as an all-day, quick-service marketplace with an open-kitchen layout, Paint Out Point Bar and Grill as a relaxed poolside dining spot, and Dandelion Terrace as a specialized lounge offering views of the Magic Kingdom fireworks. These venues are all expected to open on July 1, 2027.

== History ==
Walt Disney World Resort announced a new deluxe hotel and 16th vacation club property on October 18, 2018. The resort would include 900 rooms and club villas built on the shore of Bay Lake on the former site of Disney's River Country. The property was set to open in 2022, before being delayed.

At Destination D on November 17, 2018, then Disney Parks, Experiences and Products chairman Bob Chapek indicated the resort name as Reflections – A Disney Lakeside Lodge.

As of early 2020, the Reflections Project was progressing, with construction & excavations taking place. Official artist impressions were released along with details about the resort.

As of 2020, all references to the resort had been removed from Disney websites and digital press releases, suggesting that development of the resort had been either cancelled or postponed for a later date, likely due to the COVID-19 pandemic.

On November 26, 2024, it was announced that the resort would be renamed to Disney's Lakeshore Lodge, which will be opening in Summer 2027.

On April 21, 2026, Disney Parks Blog announced that accommodation types would range from studios to suites, and also introduce one- and two-bedroom Lake Houses along the waterline, similar to the Cascade Cabins at Copper Creek Villas.

Following the announcement, it was reportedly that The Wetlands at Disney's Lakeshore Lodge is divided into five themed water zones: Lakeshore Lagoon (the main zero-entry pool with a spiral slide), Daydream River (a lazy river), Cypress Point (a leisure pool and whirlpool spa for fireworks viewing), and two play areas inspired by Disney Animation's Pocahontas, Heron Shores and Otter Springs. More details were released in August 2026, which revealed that the hotel will feature a lobby, restaurant and fireworks lounge.
