= Discovery Island (Bay Lake) =

Former attraction in Walt Disney World

- Previously known as Treasure Island, Riles Island, Idle Bay Isle, Raz Island
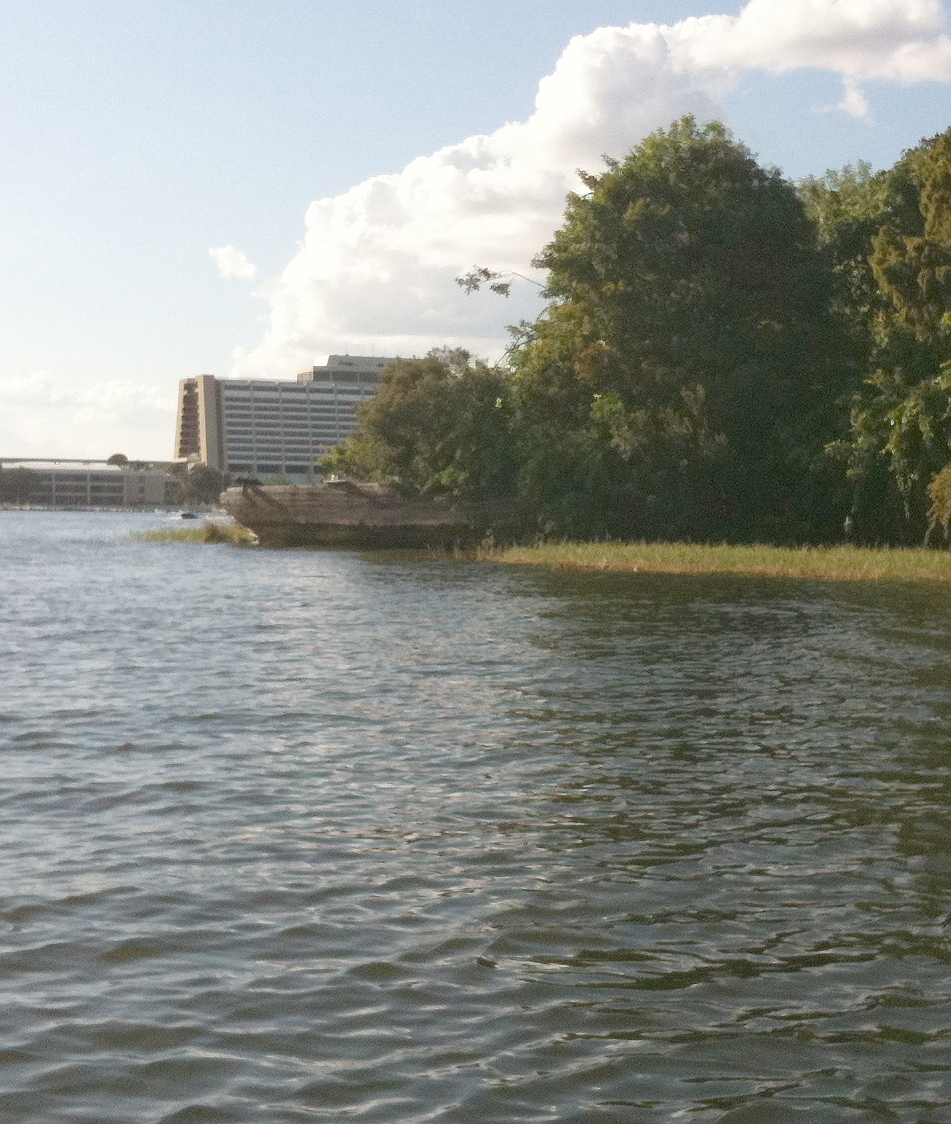
- The Wreck of the Walrus on Discovery
- Interactive map of Discovery Island
- Location: Bay Lake, Florida, United States
- Coordinates: 28°24′52″N 81°34′01″W
- Opened: April 8, 1974
- Closed: April 8, 1999
- Owner: The Walt Disney Company
- Operated by: Walt Disney Parks and Resorts
- Theme: Animal observation
- Area: 11.5 acres (4.7 ha)

Discovery Island (Previously known as Treasure Island) is an 11.5-acre (4.7 ha) island located on the property of Walt Disney World in Bay Lake, Florida. From 1974 to 1999, it operated as a zoological attraction and nature park, where guests could observe various species of animals and birds.

It was closed to the public on April 8, 1999 and currently sits abandoned. However, it can still be seen from watercraft in the area.

== History ==
=== Origins ===
From 1900 to 1937, the island was known as Raz Island, named after the family that had resided there. In the late 1930s, it was purchased for $800 by Delmar "Radio Nick" Nicholson, who renamed it "Idle Bay Isle" and lived there for 20 years with his wife and pet crane, growing exotic plants. It was later sold after the island's owner became ill and was renamed "Riles Island," and used as a hunting retreat. In 1965, the Walt Disney Company purchased it as part of its strategic property acquisitions before building the Walt Disney World Resort.

=== Opening ===
The island opened as an attraction on April 8, 1974 under the name Treasure Island. It operated as a place for guests to observe different types of wildlife. It was later renamed Discovery Island after it became recognized as a zoological park. The admission cost in 1995 was $10.60 for adults and $5.83 for children aged three through nine. In March 1999, admission was $12.67 for adults and $6.89 for children, including tax. The island's facilities were the home of the last known dusky seaside sparrow before it died in July 1987. The island housed approximately 150 birds and small primates.

=== Animal cruelty ===
In 1989, Disney was accused by People for the Ethical Treatment of Animals (PETA) of mistreating vultures that landed on the island. They also accused employees of shooting at falcons, hawks, and owls that preyed on the park's show pigeons, as well as destroying the eggs and nests of protected egrets and ibises to prevent them from nesting on the island. Disney confirmed that at least 15 of 72 vultures had died while being captured by their employees. Following these allegations, State and Federal officials charged Disney with 16 counts of animal cruelty.

=== Filming location ===
The island was occasionally used as a movie filming location, most notably for the climax of Treasure of Matecumbe, in which it doubled for the titular Florida Key.

=== Closure ===
Discovery Island closed to the public on April 8, 1999, exactly 25 years after its opening. but continued to operate until July 9, 1999, at which point all of its animals had been relocated to Disney's Animal Kingdom (whose Safari Village hub area was renamed Discovery Island) and other zoos. Although Disney never officially stated its reasons for closing the park, it is widely speculated that high costs of maintenance, declining attendance, improper treatment of animals, and the opening of a bigger and newer Disney Animal Kingdom are the most likely reasons.

Since its closing, the island has sat largely abandoned, with no signs of development. Disney considered teaming up with Cyan Worlds to turn the island into a replica of the titular island from the video game Myst, where visitors would solve puzzles while exploring. As of 2025, all original buildings and attractions remain on the island, though several have sustained major damage from hurricanes and natural decay.

Today, the island can easily be seen from Walt Disney World Monorail, Disney's Wilderness Lodge, Disney's Contemporary Resort and Disney's Fort Wilderness Resort & Campground, as well as from boat trips between them. It is adjacent to the former site of Disney's River Country water park, which closed in November 2001 and was ultimately demolished in April 2019.

=== Unsanctioned visits ===
In 2009, an account was published of an unauthorized exploration "a couple of years ago" with photographs by Shane Perez. In 2017, a film was published by Matt Sonswa of exploration of the island. On April 30, 2020, a man was arrested for camping on Discovery Island, supposedly attempting to spend quarantine on the island. He was discovered from a Trail Camera placed on the Island and later removed from the island and banned from Walt Disney property. He called the island a "tropical paradise", and said he did not know the area was off limits to the public.

== Former attractions ==
- Parrots Perch – The Discovery Island Bird Show, featuring macaws, cockatoos, and other trained birds.
- Monkey Colony – Capuchin monkeys
- Trumpeter Springs – Trumpeter swans
- Bamboo Hollow – Lemurs
- Vulture's Haunt – Vultures
- Toucan Corner – Toucans
- Cranes's Roost – Demoiselle cranes, sandhill cranes, and grey crowned cranes
- Avian Way – Then, the United States' most extensive breeding colony of scarlet ibis. Muntjacs and peacocks were also kept here.
- Pelican Bay – Brown pelicans
- Flamingo Lagoon – Flamingos
- Tortoise Beach – five Galápagos tortoises
- Alligator Pool – American alligators
- Eagle's Watch – Bald eagles
