= Fort Wilderness Junction =

Hotel in Florida, United States

Fort Wilderness Junction (also referred to as the Buffalo Junction Resort) was to be a 600-room hotel at the Walt Disney World Resort in Florida between Fort Wilderness and Disney's Wilderness Lodge.

Plans for the hotel were announced by the Walt Disney Company as part of the "Disney Decade," an ambitious plan by the company to significantly expand and develop its theme park and resort properties in the 1990s. The hotel would have been similar to the Boardwalk area near Epcot, but themed to the Old West, with horses on sawdust-strewn streets, and would have a copy of the Buffalo Bill Wild West Show from Disneyland Paris.

In response to a national economic recession in 1992, Fort Wilderness Junction and several other "Disney Decade" projects were postponed indefinitely.
