= Disney's Animal Kingdom Lodge =

Hotel at Walt Disney World

Coordinates: 28.353637°N 81.602756°W

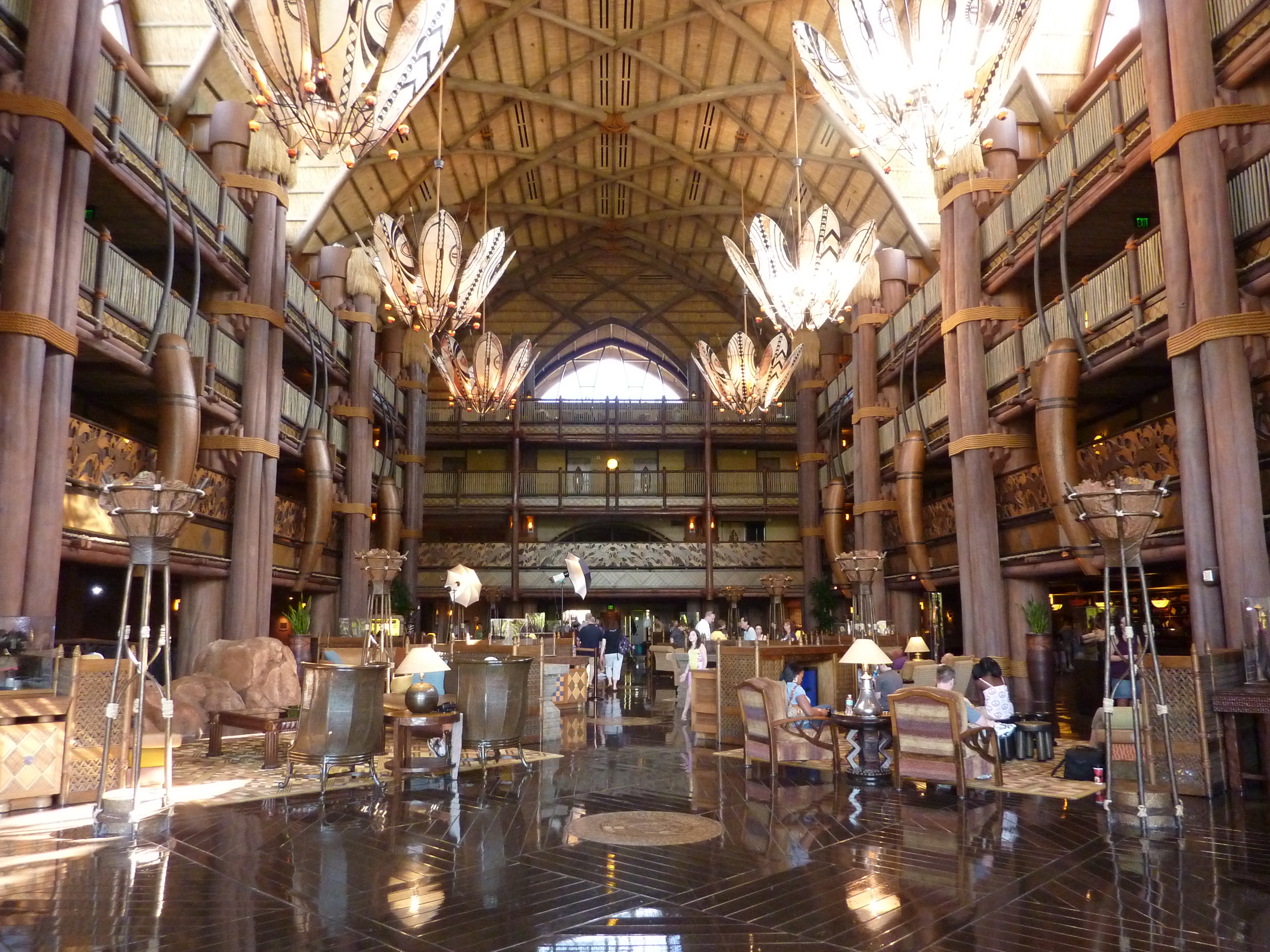
- Lobby of Jambo House
- Interactive map of the Disney's Animal Kingdom Lodge area

General information
- Type: Resort
- Location: Animal Kingdom Resort Area
- Opened: April 16, 2001

Other information
- Number of rooms: 1,307

Website
- Official website

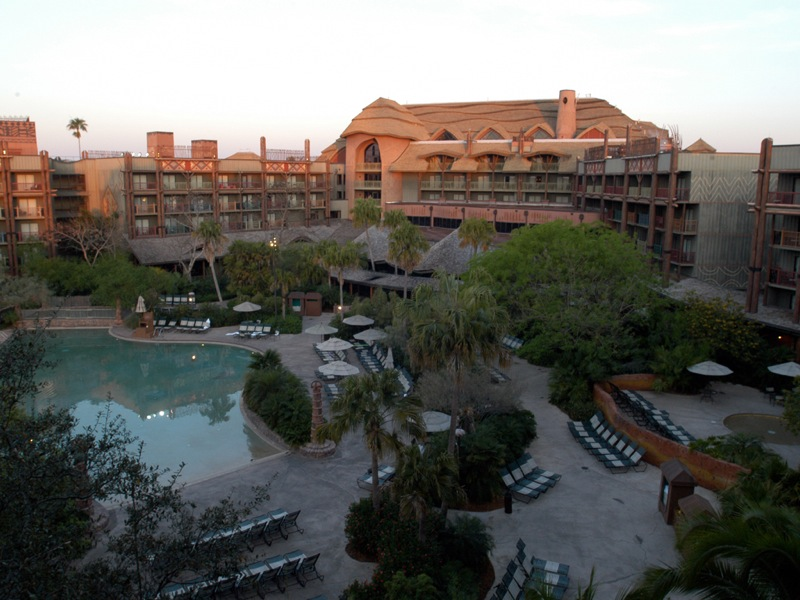
Animal Kingdom Lodge pool

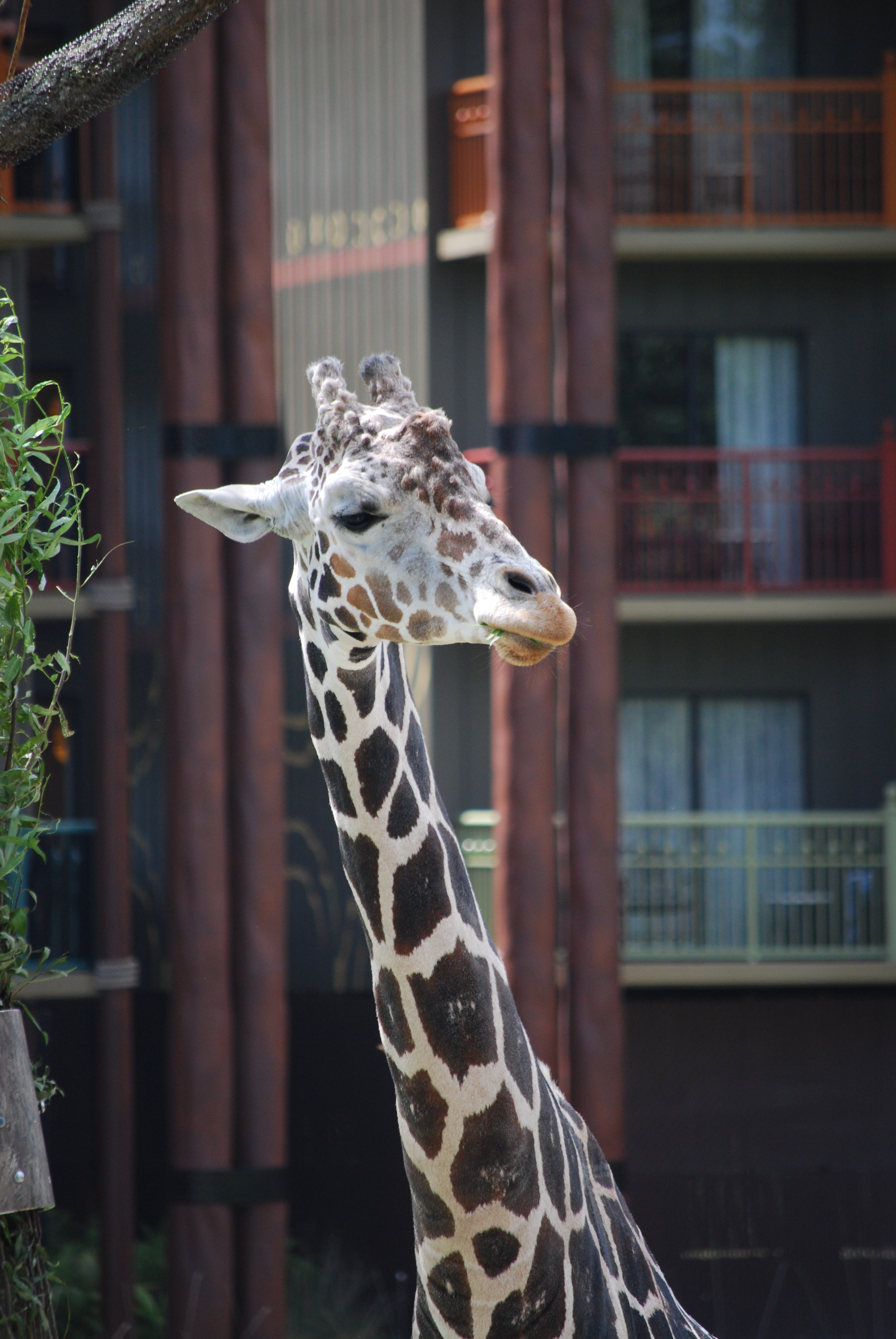
Giraffe on the savannah at Jambo House

Disney's Animal Kingdom Lodge is an African-themed deluxe resort at the Walt Disney World Resort in Bay Lake, Florida. It opened on April 16, 2001. The resort is owned and operated by Disney Experiences.

Disney's Animal Kingdom Lodge is located in the Animal Kingdom Resort Area, adjacent to Disney's Animal Kingdom. It gives guests the opportunity to view grazing wildlife outside their rooms and public areas in the resort within proximity of the animals, conveying the feeling of being in an African savanna.

== History ==
This hotel was designed by Denver architect Peter Dominick of Urban Design Group (now 4240 Architecture), who also designed Disney's Wilderness Lodge and Disney's Grand Californian Hotel & Spa.

On October 11, 2006, Disney announced to local media that Disney's Animal Kingdom Lodge would become home to the newest Disney Vacation Club property, Disney's Animal Kingdom Villas. On February 18, 2008, Disney announced the first phase of this expansion was complete and included 109 rooms.

A separate building named Kidani Village was built to the west of the original building and houses more than 300 villas. Sunset Savanna was extended to the new structure and more species of animals were introduced. A new pool was built and features water slides and an aquatic playground. Kidani Village opened 65% of its rooms on May 1, 2009. At that time, the original building was renamed Jambo House. The remainder of Kidani Village was completed in September 2009.

== Resort ==
=== Rooms ===
- Most rooms are available with either two queen-size beds, or one queen-size bed and twin-size bunk beds. Rooms with a king bed are available but are fewer in count than the others.
- Rooms are available with accommodations for guests with disabilities, including rooms with roll-in showers and accommodations for hearing impairments.
- Amenities including room service, irons, ironing boards, hairdryers, and make-up mirrors are available for each room. In-room coffee makers and mini-fridges are also available.
- All Walt Disney World resorts are entirely non-smoking, made effective June 1, 2012.

=== Dining ===
- Jiko—The Cooking Place: This Signature Dining restaurant is located in Jambo House and features African-style cooking with influences from the Mediterranean coast, India and Europe. Jiko also features South African vintage wines. The restaurant's interior was designed by Jeffrey Beers International and emulates an African lodge with a color palette in earth tones. The dining room surrounds an open kitchen which includes twin wood-burning stoves. The private Cape Town Wine Room seats up to forty guests and showcases a collection of wine-based sculptures. Jiko means "a cooking place" in Swahili, thus the restaurant's subtitle "The Cooking Place".
- Cape Town Lounge and Wine Bar: Located near Jiko, this quaint lounge features a wide variety of specialty African wines, along with hand-crafted cocktails, imported beer, and other specialty drinks.
- Boma—Flavors of Africa: This restaurant is also located in Jambo House and features African-style cooking in a buffet setting. The buffet itself features items from fifty different African countries. The restaurant was designed to resemble an open African marketplace. Food is prepared in view of diners in open cooking areas which allows for interaction between chefs, cooks, and guests. Boma is a word in Swahili and several other African languages, meaning an enclosure, such as a fort or a livestock pen.
- Victoria Falls Lounge: Perched above Boma, this lounge offers a variety of African wines, beers, specialty cocktails and other drinks. In addition, the lounge also features a small menu of African-inspired bar fare.
- The Mara: Located in Jambo House, The Mara is the resort’s quick service restaurant, serving American with African influences. In addition, The Mara features a grab-&-go section with pre-made items including salads, sandwiches & pastries, among others.
- Uzima Springs Pool Bar: This watering hole-inspired pool bar is located on within Jambo House. Located right beside the Uzima Springs pool guests can indulge in various cocktails and African beers and wines. Food is also available from 11 a.m. to 7 p.m. offering multiple selections from the quick service with the convenience of dining poolside. The Disney Dining Plan is also accepted at this location.
- Sanaa: Located in Kidani Village and overlooking the savanna, this restaurant draws its inspiration from the cuisines along the historical spice route of Africa, India, China, and Europe. Serving foods from tandoor ovens as well as slow-cooked specialties, the selections here are filled with flavorful spices of Africa. There is also a lounge area inside Sanaa with a more limited menu.
- Maji Pool Bar: Similarly to Uzima Springs, Samawati Springs (the main pool of Kidani Village) contains a pool bar, featuring a variety of cocktails, African beers and wines. Along with this, the bar also features various food options from 11 a.m. to 3 p.m. “Maji” translates to water in Swahili.

=== Recreation & Amenities ===
- Pools: The resort features two main pools: Uzima Springs (Located in Jambo House) & Samawati Springs (Located in Kidani Village). Both pools feature zero-depth entries & waterslides along with a lush African-inspired setting within the resort's savanna. Resort guests have access to both pools. In addition, Samawati Springs contains Uwanja Camp, a water playground containing three distinct areas (Observation Station, Departure Zone & Base Camp) and featuring various water cannons, play structures, interactive water features and a tipping bucket.
- Playground: Jambo House also contains a playground for children, Hakuna Matata Playground, featuring various slides and other play structures. The playground itself overlooks the flamingo area and surrounding savanna.
- Arcades: There are two arcades that service the main buildings of the resort: Jambo House has Pumbaa's Fun and Games Arcade, while Kidani Village has Safari So Good Arcade. Both arcades contain a mix of classic and modern arcade games.
- Fitness Centres: The resort features two fitness centres featuring a large collection of workout equipment, ranging from weights to treadmills and other cardio equipment: Survival of the Fittest services Kidani Village, while Zahanati is located in Jambo House.
- Spa: In addition to a fitness centre, Zahanati also features a full-service spa, offering a variety of massages and facials.
- Sports: Kidani Village has two different courts for guests to use, a half-court for basketball, and two tennis courts. Both courts are accessible to guests at Jambo House as well.
- Shops: The resort features two gift shops: Zawadi Marketplace in Jambo House & Johari Treasures in Kidani Village. Both shops features traditional gift shop items, along with both resort-specific and Animal Kingdom merchandise.
- Other Activities: Like many of the other resorts on property, Animal Kingdom Lodge features other activities for guests to enjoy, including "Movies Under the Stars", pool events, painting, a community hall containing various tabletop games, and campfires (located in both areas of the resort), to name a few.

== Savannas ==
Around the resort, there are three total 11-acre savannas (Sunset Savanna, Arusha Savanna, Uzima Savanna) housing a variety of African mammals, birds, and reptiles including addax, Ankole cattle, bongo, bontebok, eland, gemsbok, Grant's zebra, greater kudu, impala, okapi, red river hog, reticulated giraffe, Thomson's gazelle, waterbuck, white-bearded wildebeest, Abyssinian ground hornbill, blue crane, East African crowned crane, greater flamingo, Marabou stork, ostrich, pink-backed pelican, Rüppell's griffon vulture, and radiated tortoise.
