= Disney's Hilton Head Island Resort =

Disney hotel located in Hilton Head Island, South Carolina

Coordinates: 32°10′56″N 80°43′46″W

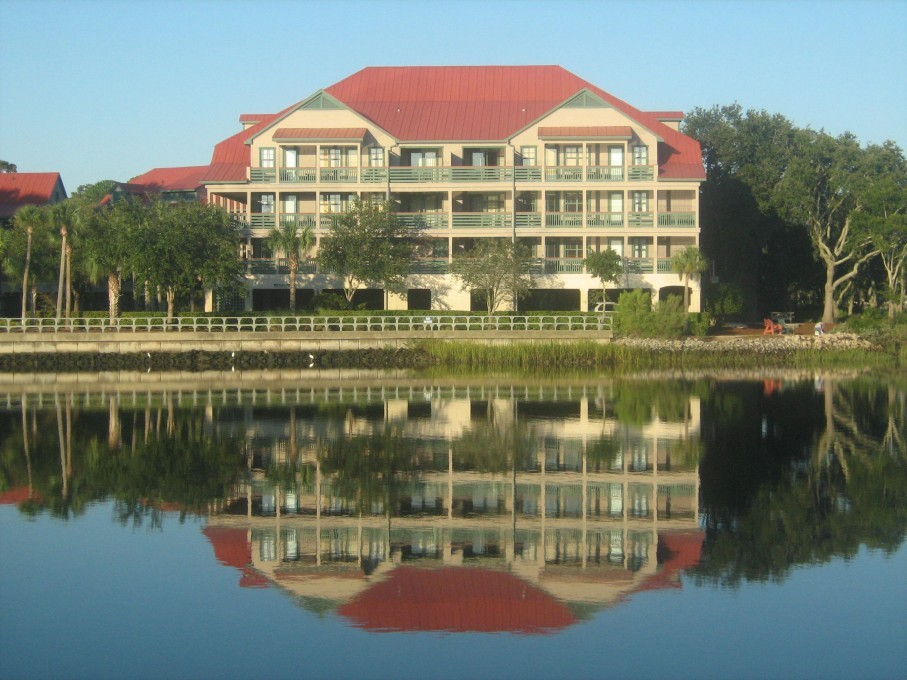
- Backside of Disney's Hilton Head Island Resort
- Interactive map of the Disney's Hilton Head Island Resort area

General information
- Type: Resort
- Location: Hilton Head Island, South Carolina
- Opened: March 1, 1996
- Operator: Disney Experiences

Website
- Official website

Disney's Hilton Head Island Resort is a Disney Vacation Club Resort and vacation rental accommodation located in Hilton Head Island, South Carolina. Alongside Disney's Vero Beach Resort and Aulani, the Hilton Head resort is one of Disney's three "stand-alone" hotels located in an area without any adjacent theme parks. It opened on March 1, 1996, as part of the Disney brand of timeshares.

== Resort ==
Opened on March 1, 1996, the Hilton Head Island Resort is the third phase of the Disney Vacation Club Resort. Designed by the architecture firm Cooper and Robertson, the property is on Hilton Head's Broad Creek, a landlocked tidal marsh on South Carolina's coast.

It has two eating spots and a rustic-themed resort.

== Gallery ==
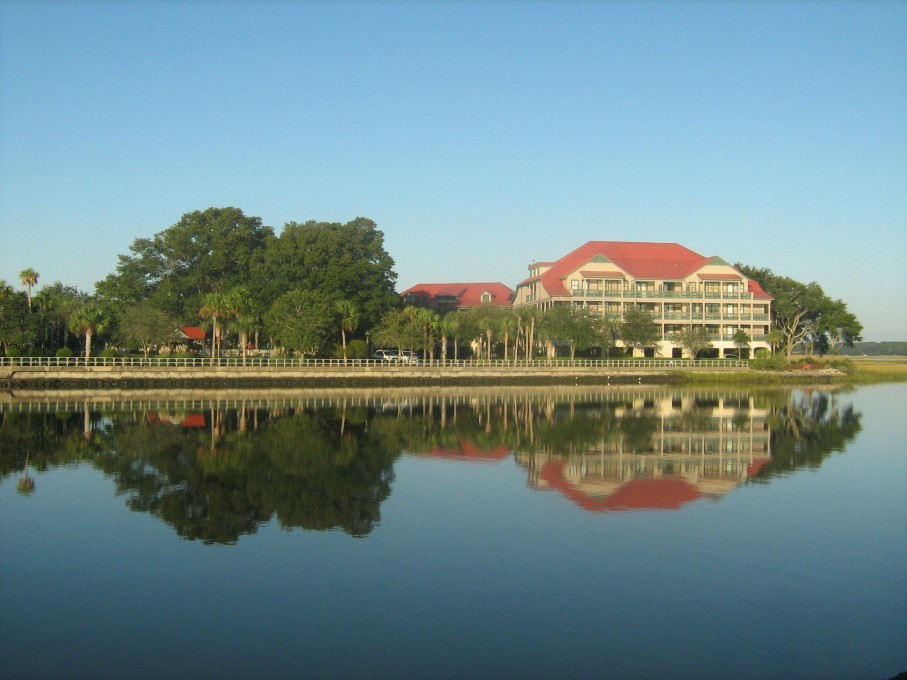
Disney's Hilton Head Island Resort from across the creek at Newport Villas

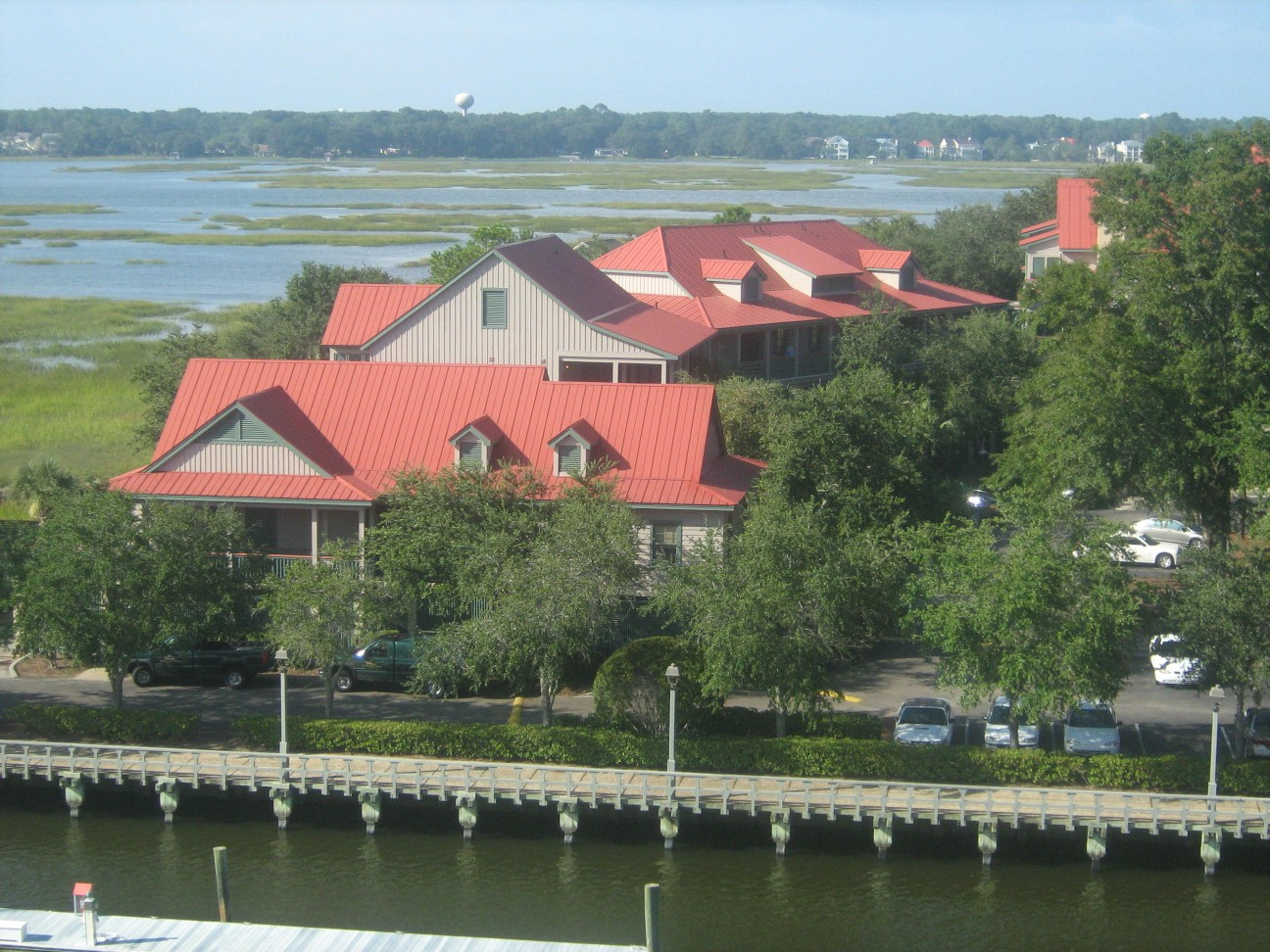
Disney's Hilton Head Island Resort from the roof of Harbourside I in Shelter Cove

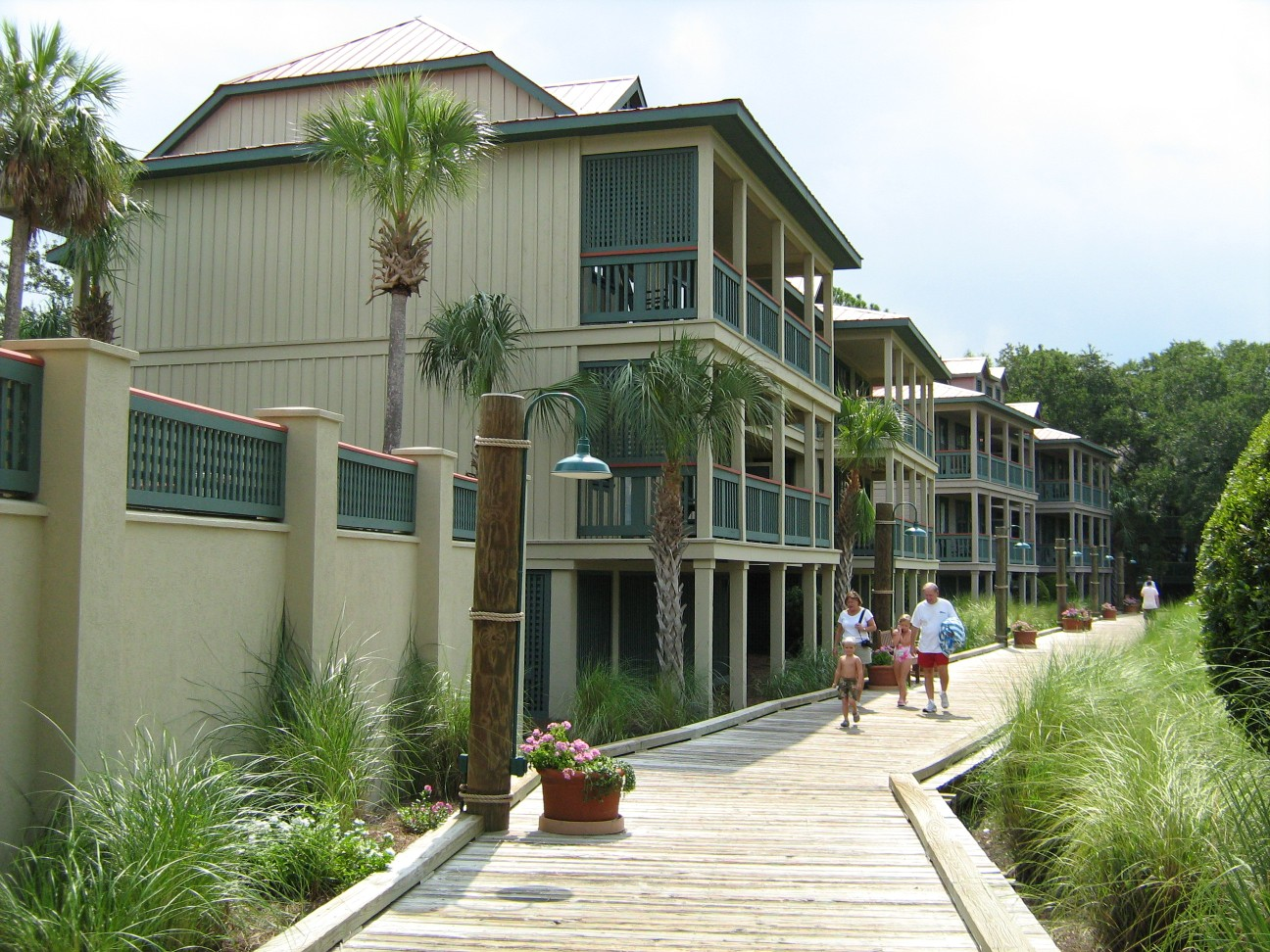
Boardwalk on the creek

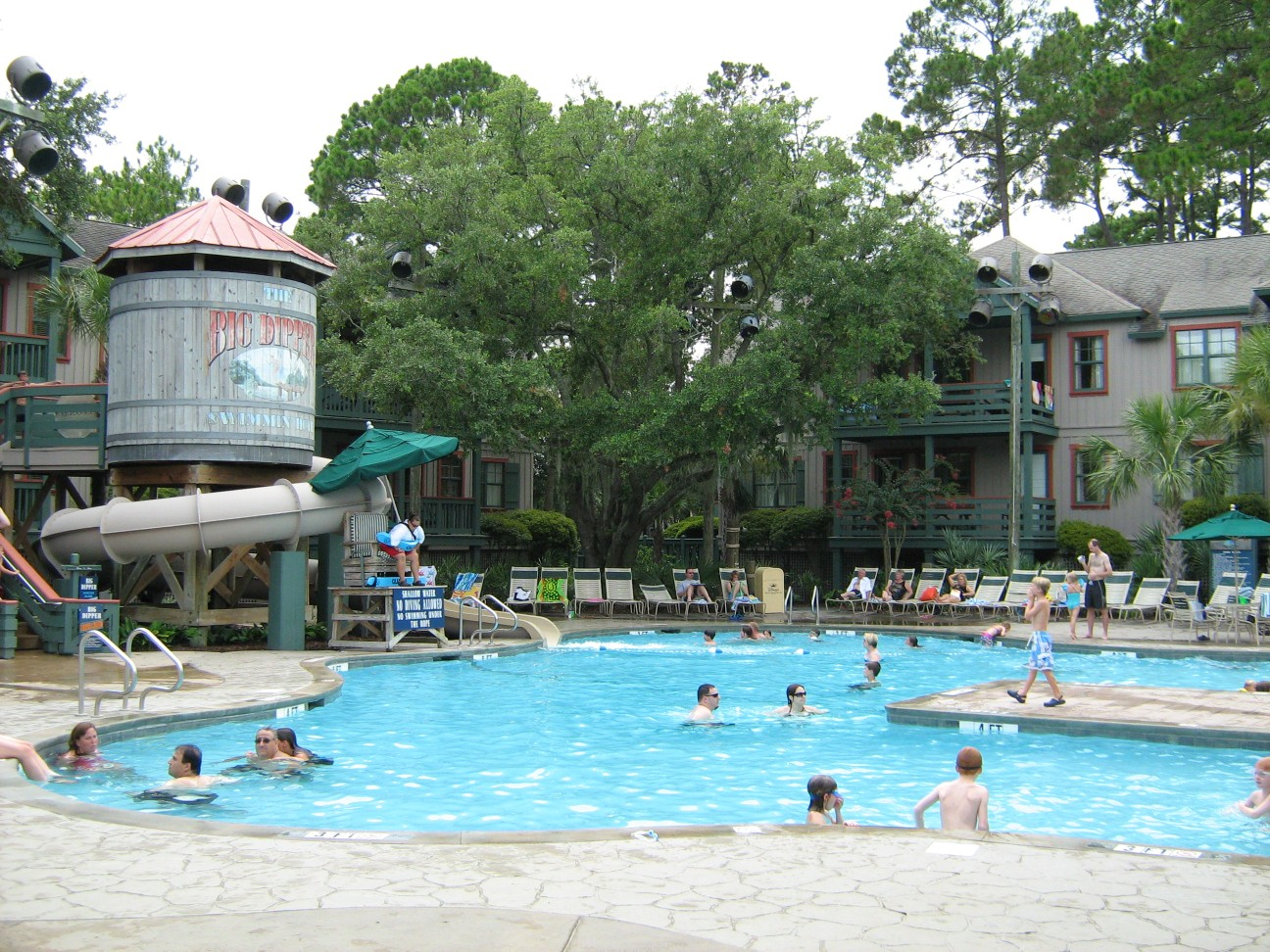
Pool area of Disney's Hilton Head Island Resort

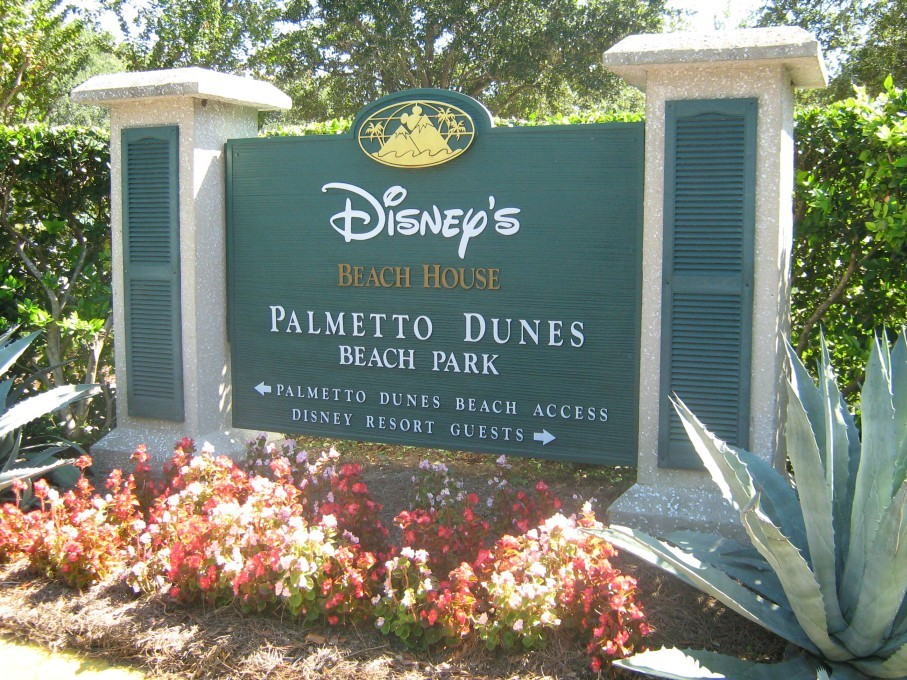
Entrance sign of Disney's Beach House

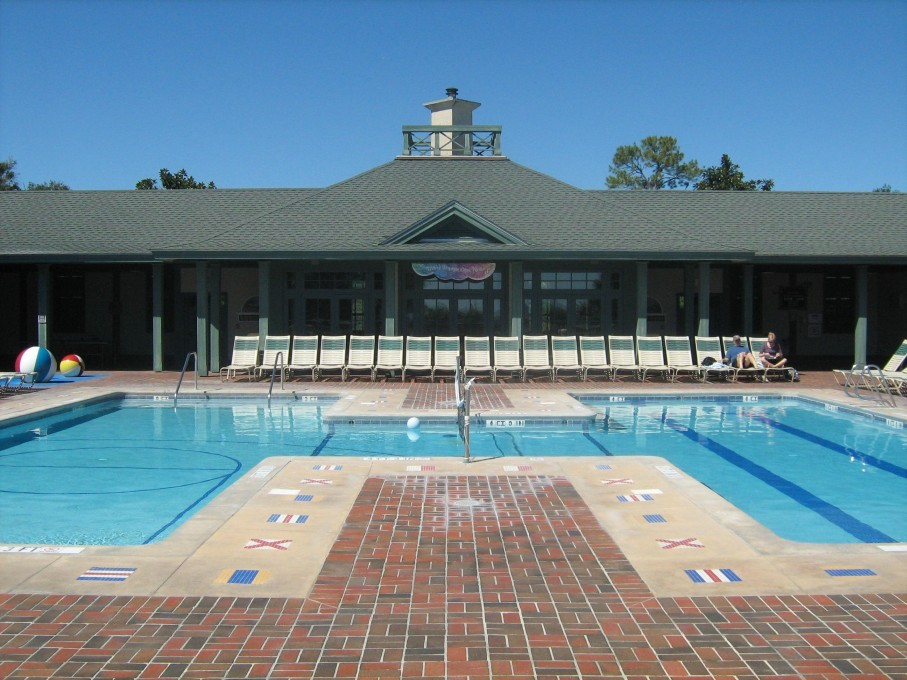
Pool area of Disney's Beach House

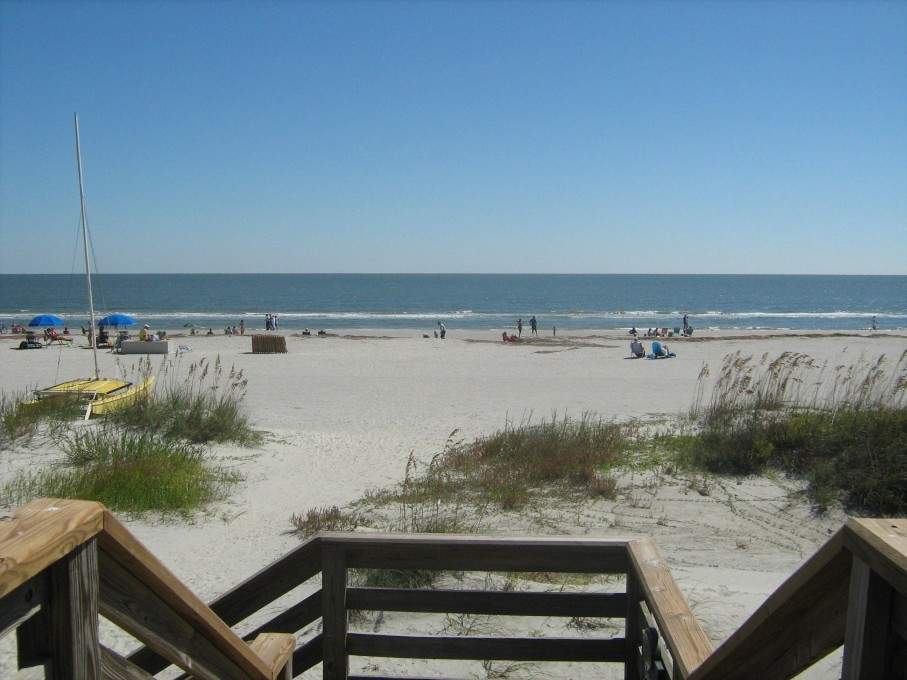
View of the beach from end of wooden boardwalk at Disney's Beach House
