= Bay Lake Tower =

Hotel at Walt Disney World, Florida, US

Coordinates: 28.416314°N 81.576747°W

Bay Lake Tower at Disney's Contemporary Resort

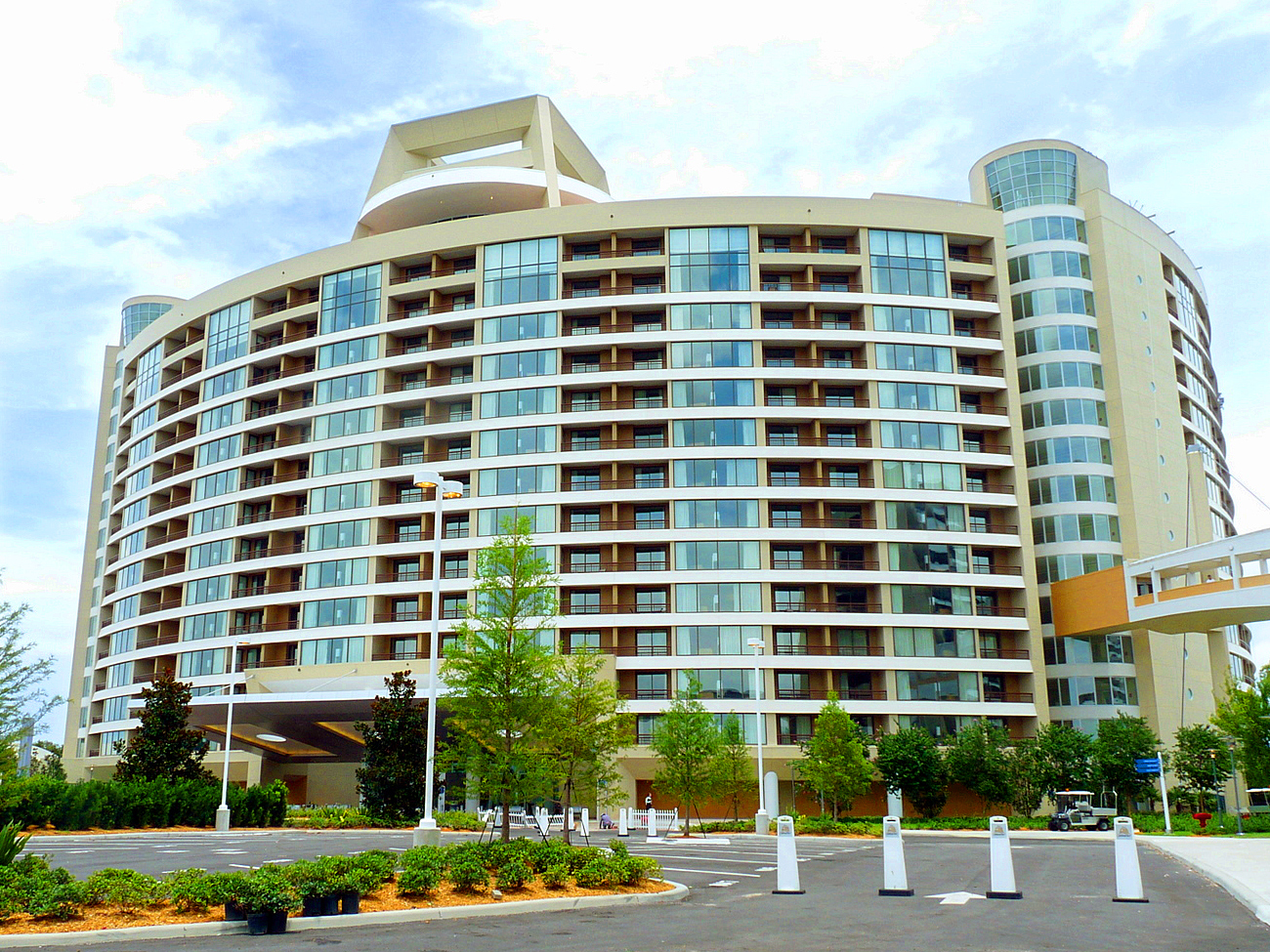
- Exterior of Bay Lake Tower
- Interactive map of the Bay Lake Tower at Disney's Contemporary Resort area

General information
- Type: Resort
- Location: Magic Kingdom Resort Area
- Opened: August 4, 2009

Website
- Official website

Bay Lake Tower at Disney's Contemporary Resort, commonly known as Bay Lake Tower, is a Disney Vacation Club resort located at the Walt Disney World Resort in Bay Lake, Florida. It opened in 2009 and is located in the Magic Kingdom Resort Area, adjacent to Disney's Contemporary Resort, Bay Lake, and Magic Kingdom.

While the tower is designated as a standalone Disney Vacation Club resort hotel, it is considered an addition to Disney's Contemporary Resort, as they both share the same theme. It occupies the land formerly occupied by the North Garden Wing, a building that was adjacent to the main tower and mirrored the still-standing South Garden Wing.

== History ==
In 2006, Disney filed plans for a project on the site of the Contemporary Resort's North Garden Wing and a construction fence was erected, encompassing the wing and part of its parking lot. Disney's Racquet Club was demolished by January 30, 2007, while the North Wing itself was demolished between January 31 and April 6, 2007. Construction on the new building continued through 2007, without Disney officially announcing what was actually being built.

In February 2007, Disney gained approval from the Florida Department of Business and Professional Regulation to begin selling Disney Vacation Club units at a property called "Kingdom Tower at Disney's Contemporary Resort". Approval was granted for an initial sale of 75 units, with the Kingdom Tower ultimately containing 281 timeshare units. The approval did not, however, state when Disney Vacation Club would actually begin selling units, only that they could do so. In preparation for the future sale, Disney incorporated a condominium association for the property on January 9, 2007 that would manage the units. The project was officially unveiled on September 16, 2008. Timeshares began on September 28, 2008 to existing Disney Vacation Club members and on October 5, 2008 for new members.

Bay Lake Tower is the ninth Disney Vacation Club resort, and the seventh located at the Walt Disney World Resort. It is the second Disney Vacation Club resort to be built in the Magic Kingdom Resort Area, following The Villas at Disney's Wilderness Lodge, which opened in 2000.

== Layout ==
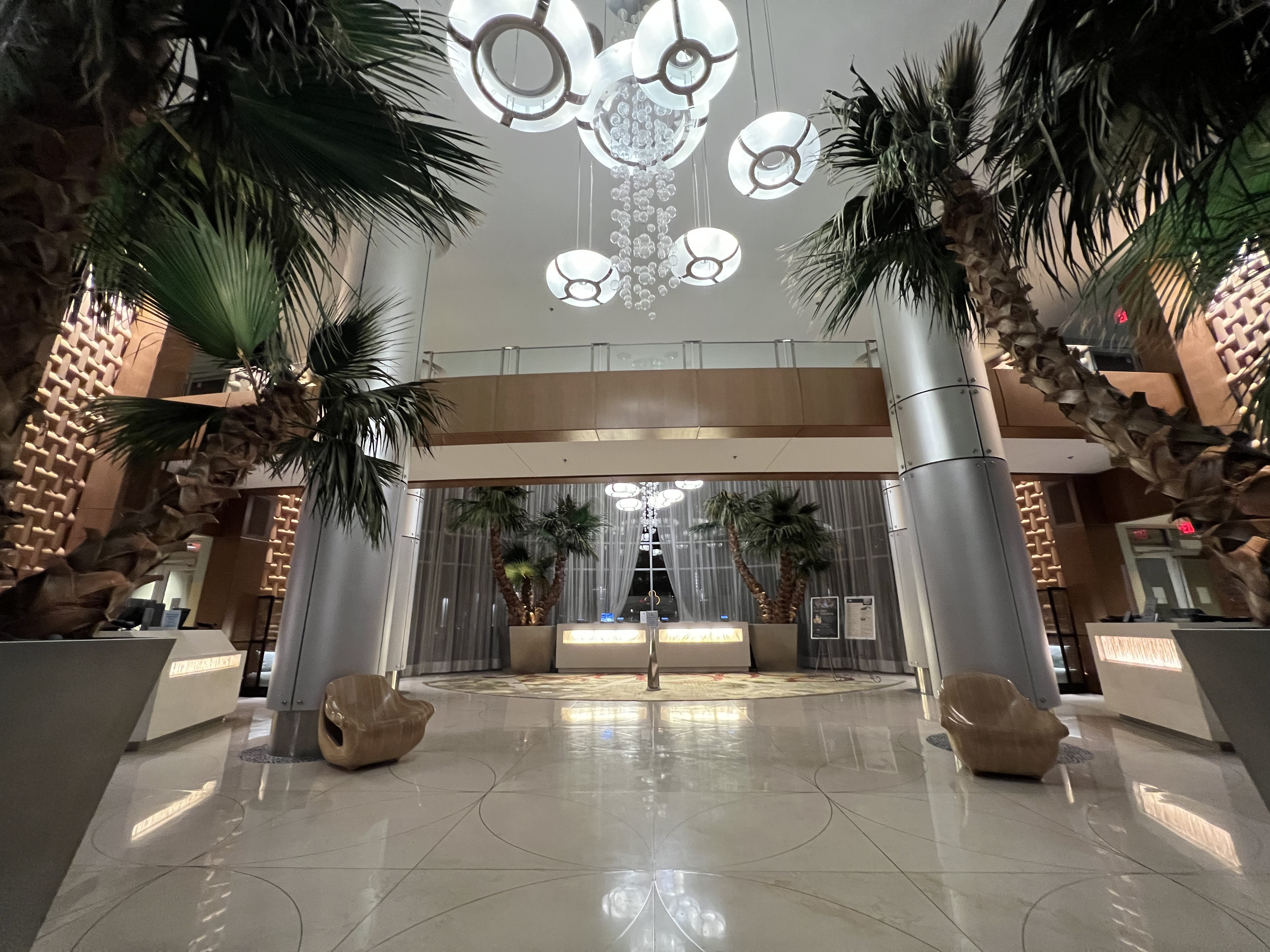
Bay Lake Tower's main lobby

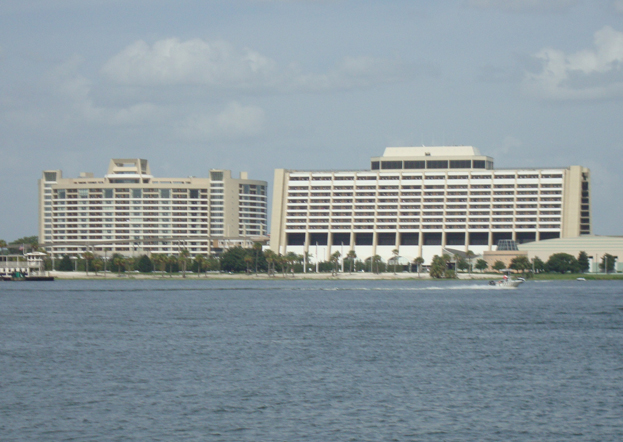
The large size of Bay Lake Tower (left) next to Disney's Contemporary Resort has been criticized.

Non-Disney Vacation Club members may stay in Bay Lake Tower villas on cash reservations. There is limited availability to trade into Bay Lake Tower using an RCI timeshare exchange. There may be a fee associated with changing points from Rci to Disney Vacation Club Points. The tower shares design features with the original Contemporary Resort, sharing the same modern theme. As a result of the building's shape, rooms have a wedge shape that give them a unique floor plan from other Disney Vacation Club villas.

Bay Lake Tower features its own pool, water feature play area, pool bar, and bocce court in the courtyard at the center of the horseshoe. The pool has a spiral waterside designed with neon light and glass brick accents to match the resort's contemporary feel. Bay Lake Tower guests are permitted to use the Contemporary Resort's facilities, but only those with a room in Bay Lake Tower may use the Tower amenities. Access to the Bay Lake Tower pool area is key card controlled. The Tower also has a Community Hall featuring TV, board games, and art supplies, as well as its own guest laundry room. The front desk, concierge, valet, bell services and transportation are shared services provided through the main resort, however Bay Lake Tower does have a separate 24-hour check-in area on the ground floor of the Tower. The Skyway Bridge on the 5th Floor of Bay Lake Tower connects to the 4th Floor of the main tower next to the Fantasia Shop in the Grand Canyon Concourse.

The units are among the most expensive offered by Disney Vacation Club, presumably because of their proximity to the Magic Kingdom. Some of the resort's features include full-length windows with views into the Magic Kingdom or onto Bay Lake. Some bathrooms on the Magic Kingdom side include movable partitions to permit watching the park's fireworks displays from the bathtub. Toward the top of the tower, there are several two-story units that contain large windows. Like all Vacation Club resorts, the one-bedroom, two-bedroom and grand villa units contain full kitchens. The tower contains 295 Disney Vacation Club units consisting of 148 dedicated two-bedroom units, 133 lock-off two-bedroom units (which can be booked together as a two-bedroom unit, or booked separately as either a deluxe studio unit or a one-bedroom unit), and 14 three-bedroom Grand Villa units. There are no dedicated studios or dedicated one-bedroom units in Bay Lake Tower. Each villa is assigned to one of three booking categories: Magic Kingdom View, Bay Lake View, or Standard View, with the relative cost or number of required Disney Vacation Club points assigned accordingly. Although the Magic Kingdom can be seen from some standard and Bay Lake view rooms, the premium views of the park are given the Magic Kingdom view category. Standard view rooms tend to be lower-level rooms that overlook either the parking lot, a service area or an obstructed view. The remainder of the tower is assigned the Bay Lake View category, with views primarily of either Bay Lake or the pool.

Similar to the California Grill atop the Contemporary Resort's main tower, Bay Lake Tower is capped with the Top of the World Lounge - A Villain’s Lair. The name pays homage to a former name of the California Grill. The lounge includes a viewing deck and also an indoor seating area with a full bar. A limited food menu is available. Only Disney Vacation Club members may access the lounge from 5 pm until midnight, as long as they are staying at a Walt Disney World resort. At busy times of year (notably Christmas and New Year) access to the lounge is limited to those staying at Bay Lake Tower. A cast member in the lobby will verify a guest's Vacation Club identification before granting access to the lounge's elevator. All Bay Lake Tower guests may visit the viewing deck until 4 pm. The lounge features views of the Magic Kingdom theme park and Bay Lake, including its surrounding resorts. It is purported that on a clear day, the Florida city of Clermont is visible from Top of the World Lounge. During fireworks at the Magic Kingdom, the soundtrack is played both inside the lounge and on the outside observation deck.

The Disney Vacation Club is a timeshare program, with Bay Lake Tower being one of the locations at which ownership interests are sold. The resort has sold out, however contracts are available via the secondary resale market. Ownership interests at Bay Lake Tower expire January 31, 2060.

== Reception ==
While reviews for the hotel itself have been generally positive, the architecture of the building has been criticized by many. Due to its large scale, critics have called it a major overshadowing to the iconic A-frame tower. Others have called it "sadly conventional" and the disappointing last work of architect Charles Gwathmey, who coincidentally died one day before Bay Lake Tower was to open to the public.
