= Disney's Animal Kingdom Villas =

Hotel at Walt Disney World Resort

General information
- Type: Resort
- Location: Animal Kingdom Resort Area
- Opened: 2007

Disney's Animal Kingdom Villas is a Disney Vacation Club resort located at Disney's Animal Kingdom Lodge at the Walt Disney World Resort.

Disney's Animal Kingdom Villas is located in the Animal Kingdom Resort Area, adjacent to Disney's Animal Kingdom.

== History ==
Disney's Animal Kingdom Villas is the eighth Disney Vacation Club timeshare resort, and the fifth located at the Walt Disney World Resort Hotels, built on a former Retention basin site.

The development was originally announced in October 2006 and the first phase opened in the summer of 2007. This phase included 134 remodeled units (216 guest rooms) on the fifth and sixth floors of the existing Disney's Animal Kingdom Lodge, which opened in 2001. Later construction added 324 units (492 guest rooms) in a new building, Kidani Village, which opened in phases and was completed in 2009. The main building of Disney's Animal Kingdom Lodge is now named Jambo House in order to prevent confusion between the two buildings.

== Resort ==
Disney's Animal Kingdom Villas – Kidani Village is an African lodge-style resort with accommodations that include kitchenettes, or kitchens, and multi-bedroom units. The location features a 21-acre wildlife preserve. Both the Jambo House and Kidani Village have smaller animal habitats that host unique and exotic animals.

The lobby and the villas of Kidani Village extend outwards in a manner meant to resemble the curlicue shape of a water buffalo's horns. Kidani Village itself is a five-story "E"-shaped building. It includes 324 units ranging from studios to 3-bedrooms, as well as an Indian-African Fusion table service restaurant. Inner and outer architecture and decorations are African-inspired, including some indigenous African shrubs and grasses.

== Dining ==
The Animal Kingdom Lodge has three primary dining locations, all featuring African and American cuisine. Sanaa is located at Kidani Village offering quick-service breakfast and table-service lunch and dinner. At Jambo House, Jiko, The Cooking Place offers table service dinner, and Boma - Flavors of Africa is a buffet restaurant. Counter-service offerings are also available at Jambo House at The Mara. Drinks and lighter snacks are available at various pool bars and the Kidani Village lobby.

== Transportation ==
Disney's Animal Kingdom Villas is served by Disney Transport bus service which transports guests to the four major theme parks: Magic Kingdom, Disney's Animal Kingdom, Epcot, and Disney's Hollywood Studios. Additional bus transportation is available to Disney Springs, Disney's Blizzard Beach, and Disney's Typhoon Lagoon. A shuttle van also runs between the two locations.

== Recreation ==
The Sunset Savanna and the Pembe Savanna are home to various African animals, a list of which is provided upon arrival at the resort. Animals listed on the resort site include Zebras, Giraffes, Gazelles, Kudu, Flamingos, and Antelope. Other recreational offerings include pool, campfire activities, watching Disney films, fitness center, community hall.

== See also ==
- Disney's Animal Kingdom Lodge
- Disney Vacation Club
