= Disney's River Country =

Former water park at Walt Disney World Resort

- Interactive map of Disney's River Country
- Location: Walt Disney World Resort, Bay Lake, Florida, United States
- Coordinates: 28.4113°N 81.5647°W
- Theme: Old-fashioned swimming hole
- Owner: The Walt Disney Company
- Operated by: Walt Disney Parks and Resorts
- Opened: June 20, 1976
- Closed: November 2, 2001
- Pools: 7 pools
- Water slides: 5 water slides
- Children's areas: 2 children's areas

Disney's River Country was the first water park located at Walt Disney World Resort in Bay Lake, Florida. River Country, located along the shores of Bay Lake and near Disney's Fort Wilderness Resort & Campground, was themed as a rustic, old-fashioned swimming hole. Opening on June 20, 1976, the park closed indefinitely on November 2, 2001. On January 20, 2005, after over three years of closure, The Walt Disney Company announced that the park would remain closed. It was the second Disney park (the first being nearby Discovery Island in 1999) to ever close permanently.

== History ==
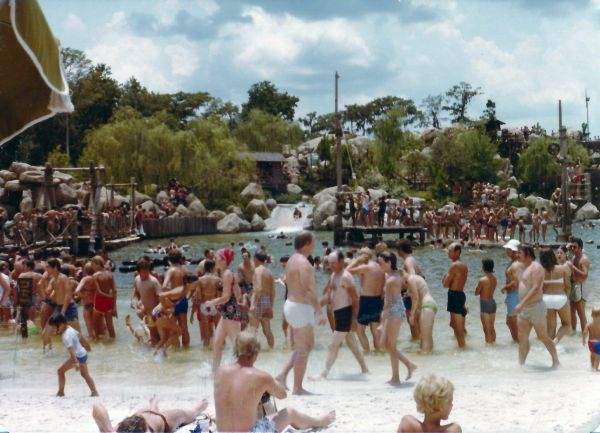
River Country in 1977

Positioned on the shore of Bay Lake, near Discovery Island, the park featured a rustic-wilderness theme, complete with lush landscaping, large rocks and man-made boulders. It was described as an "old-fashioned swimmin hole". The original working title was "Pop's Willow Grove".

The park was featured in a musical number from the 1977 Wonderful World of Disney episode "The Mouseketeers at Walt Disney World", which included a song titled "River Country", featuring the then-Mouseketeer lineup from the late 1970s incarnation of The Mickey Mouse Club enjoying its attractions.

The park featured mostly sandy ground (instead of pavement), several lakeside, sandy beaches with lawn chairs and daybeds, and a unique water-filtering system using confluent water from the adjacent Bay Lake (which was dammed-off), creating a natural-looking, albeit artificial, freshwater lagoon. The park's water was at a higher level than the lake's, which was an effort to prevent lake water from going into the park.

There were several deaths that took place at River Country. The first was of an 11-year-old boy who contracted amoebic meningoencephalitis, an amoebic infection of the brain, from the water in 1980. Park officials noted that similar amoebic infections also occurred relatively frequently elsewhere, and said it was an inherent problem with freshwater lakes in warm weather and thus could not be blamed on the park's water system. Three other children had died in similarly questionable situations, in Florida, in the same month. The other two deaths were from drowning, in 1982 and 1989.

=== Closure ===
In 1989, Disney opened a second themed water park, Typhoon Lagoon; it had more parking, slides, amenities, and was significantly larger. Six years later, in 1995, Disney opened a third themed water park, Blizzard Beach, which was bigger than both and featured more thrilling attractions.

The themed water park closed on November 2, 2001, with the expectation that it would reopen in the spring of 2002. On April 11, 2002, the Orlando Sentinel reported that "Walt Disney World's first water park, River Country, has closed and may not reopen" and that Disney World spokesman Bill Warren stated "River Country could be reopened if there's enough guest demand".

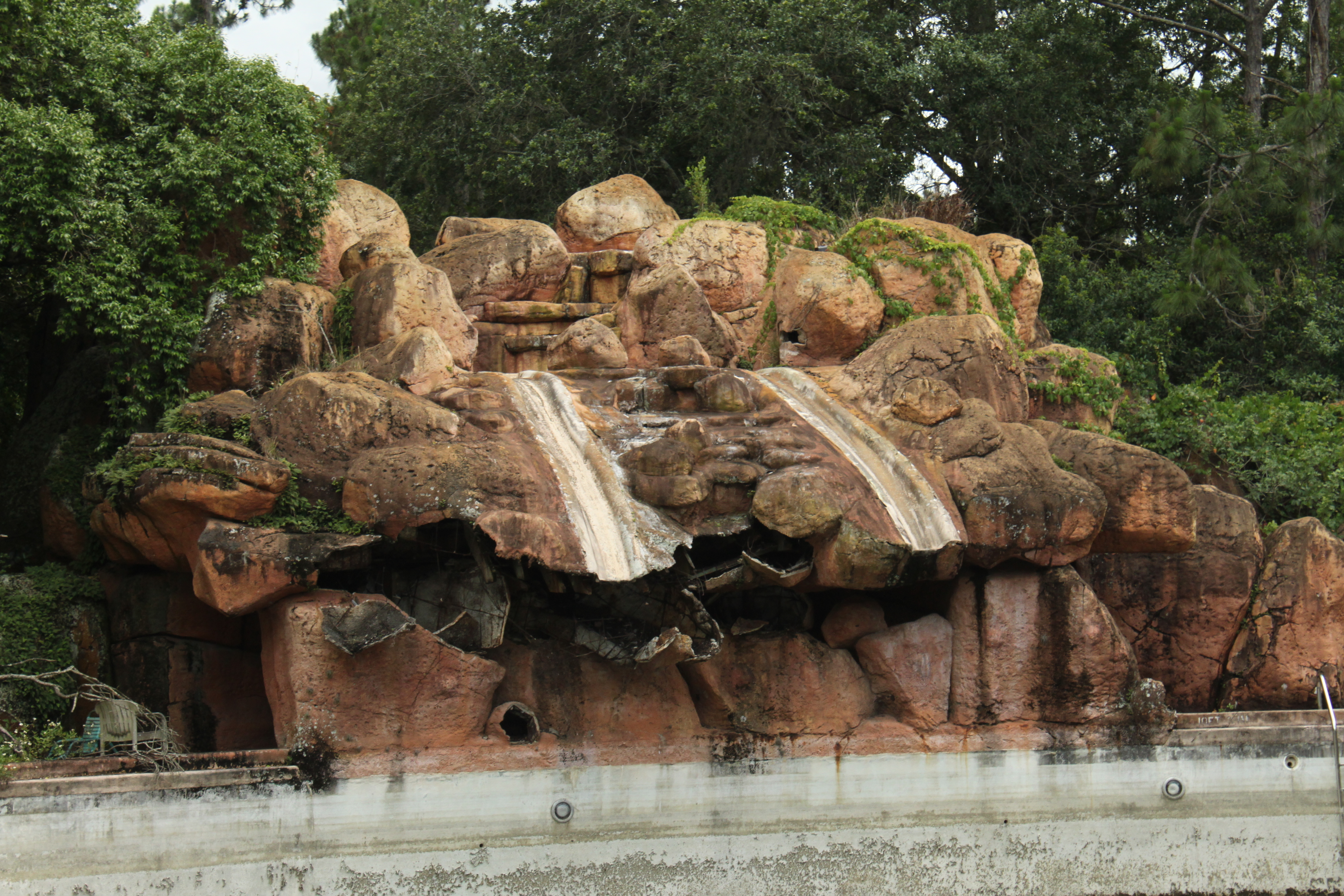
The abandoned Slippery Slide Falls attraction in 2013

In 2005, Disney officially announced that River Country would remain closed permanently, and removed the entrance water tower. For the next 17 years, River Country sat abandoned, rotting and gradually being reclaimed by nature.

During this time, the water park was fenced off with signs up reading "Sorry, River Country is closed." The park was a popular site amongst urban explorers who climbed over the green fence or walked in through the backstage driveway. The River Country Closing Theme still played in the abandoned park, while the lights automatically turned off and on; since Disney did not cut off the power to the water park.

The closure made River Country the second (of only two) Disney parks in the company's history to close its doors permanently, with nearby Discovery Island on the lake closing previously, in 1999.

On August 25, 2016, Disney announced that it would drain and fill in Upstream Plunge, the 330,000-gallon pool, though there were no immediate plans to tear down any other part of the park.

==== Demolition and replacement hotel ====
On March 5, 2018, Disney filed permits for a new mystery development labeled "Project 89" to be built along Bay Lake and over the former River Country site. A week later, it was rumored that "Project 89" would most likely be another themed resort hotel or Disney Vacation Club timeshare property.

The resort hotel was confirmed on May 31, 2018, and most remaining structures at the park, including the remnants of the Upstream Plunge pool, were demolished on April 20, 2019, to make way for the development of the new hotel. Disney later officially announced that the new deluxe resort would be nature-themed and called Reflections – A Disney Lakeside Lodge. The new resort was slated to have 900 hotel rooms and was set to open in 2022. The new hotel would also feature several Disney characters for each of the rooms including Bambi, Brother Bear, The Fox and the Hound, and Pocahontas among others. A lakeside restaurant featuring the characters from The Princess and the Frog was also slated to open along with the new resort in 2022.

Due to the COVID-19 pandemic, the Walt Disney Parks division halted all major construction on the Walt Disney World Resort property, including Reflections – A Disney Lakeside Lodge. On March 15, 2022, Disney announced that the project was scrapped for a Disney Vacation Club tower at the site. However, on November 26, 2024, Disney Vacation Club announced that Reflections – A Disney Lakeside Lodge would be built after all under the name Disney Lakeshore Lodge, planned to open in 2027.

== List of attractions ==
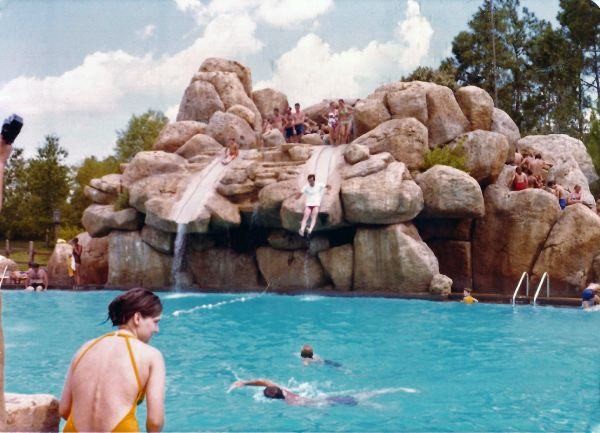
Slippery Slide Falls and Upstream Plunge in 1977

Attractions included:

- Upstream Plunge, a lung shaped clean-water pool.
- Slippery Slide Falls, two water slides that emptied into Upstream Plunge.
- Kiddie Cove, a kids zone with two large water slides and a cove. This area was targeted toward preteens.
- Barrel Bridge, a bumpy bridge with barrels under it, similar to the one at Tom Sawyer Island.
- White Water Rapids, a 330-foot (100 m) long inner tube river.
- Bay Cove, a half-acre (2,000 m^{2}) sand-bottom lake which featured a tire swing, boom swing, rope climb, and two T-bar drops.
  - Bomb Swing
  - Cable Ride
  - Tire Swing
- Whoop 'n' Holler Hollow, two water slides, 260 ft (79 m) and 160 ft (49 m) long, that emptied into Bay Cove.
- Bay Bridge
- Indian Springs, a very small splash zone with fountains spraying kids. This area was mainly designed for guests under age 8.
- Cypress Point Nature Trail, a trail among trees beside Bay Lake.
- Pony Rides
- Mercury WaterMouse Rental

== See also ==
- List of water parks
