= Bay Lake (Florida lake) =

Lake in the state of Florida, United States

- Location within Florida
- Location: Bay Lake, Florida
- Coordinates: 28°24′58″N 81°34′04″W
- Type: Lake
- Basin countries: United States
- Managing agency: Central Florida Tourism Oversight District (Disney Experiences)
- Max. width: 1 mile (1,600 m)
- Max. depth: 35 feet (11 m)
- Islands: 2 (Discovery Island and Shipwreck Island)
- Settlements: Bay Lake, Florida (see also Bordering resorts and points of interest)

Bay Lake is a natural lake about 1 mile (1,600 meters) across and with a depth of 35 feet (11 m), located in Orange County, Florida, United States, in the north end of the Walt Disney World property, in the Disney-controlled city of Bay Lake, Florida, and immediately to the east of the Magic Kingdom.

It is roughly triangular in shape and is under the jurisdiction of the Central Florida Tourism Oversight District. The lake connects with the Disney-made Seven Seas Lagoon via a water bridge on the west side.

== Bordering resorts and points of interest ==
Bay Lake is bordered by three resorts, Disney's Wilderness Lodge, Disney's Contemporary Resort, and Disney's Fort Wilderness Resort & Campground; along with Bay Lake Tower and Wilderness Lodge Villas, both owned by Disney Vacation Club. All three resorts have a marina which offers boat rentals to guests. Transportation boats run regularly between all the resorts as well.

On the southwest side of the lake, the remnants of Disney's River Country, Disney's first water park, could be found at one time. Currently construction is ongoing for a new Disney Vacation Club/hotel called Lakeshore Lodge. Lakeshore Lodge (replacing the concept hotel named Reflections), will be a 900 room hotel with significant water/pool features. In the far north corner of the lake is a dry dock service area where the transportation boats are stored at night. To the east of the dry dock there are several recreational boat docks which are used by the residents of the city of Bay Lake.

== Islands ==
There are two islands located in Bay Lake. The largest is Discovery Island located in the center of the lake and directly across from Disney's River Country. Discovery Island operated as a walk-through wildlife sanctuary from 1974 until 1999. It was closed due to its similarity in theme to the newly opened Disney's Animal Kingdom. The original dock, as well as some attractions, can still be seen on the shorelines.

As of 2023, Discovery Island's shorelines have been covered in wildlife and the only attraction still visible to the naked eye is the island's original dock and maintenance dock, both of which are located on the top side of the island from viewing by the Wilderness Lodge. They are both gated off.

The smaller of the two islands is named Shipwreck Island and is located between the Contemporary and Wilderness Lodge resorts, directly in front of the water bridge.

== Uses ==
Bay Lake is primarily used for recreational boating, offered at each of the three marinas connected to it, as well as the two additional marinas located on Seven Seas Lagoon. Fishing is not allowed in Bay Lake with the exception of fishing excursions which must be booked ahead of time. After dark fireworks cruises are offered on Bay Lake as well. The north section of the lake is reserved for watersports activities, which are operated by Sammy Duval Watersports at the Contemporary Resort. Several times a year triathlons are held, usually from the Fort Wilderness Campground. In addition, transportation boats run regular routes from each of the three resorts and several offer routes to the Magic Kingdom.
