= Disney's Vero Beach Resort =

Resort in Wabasso Beach, Florida

Coordinates: 27°45′41″N 80°23′49″W

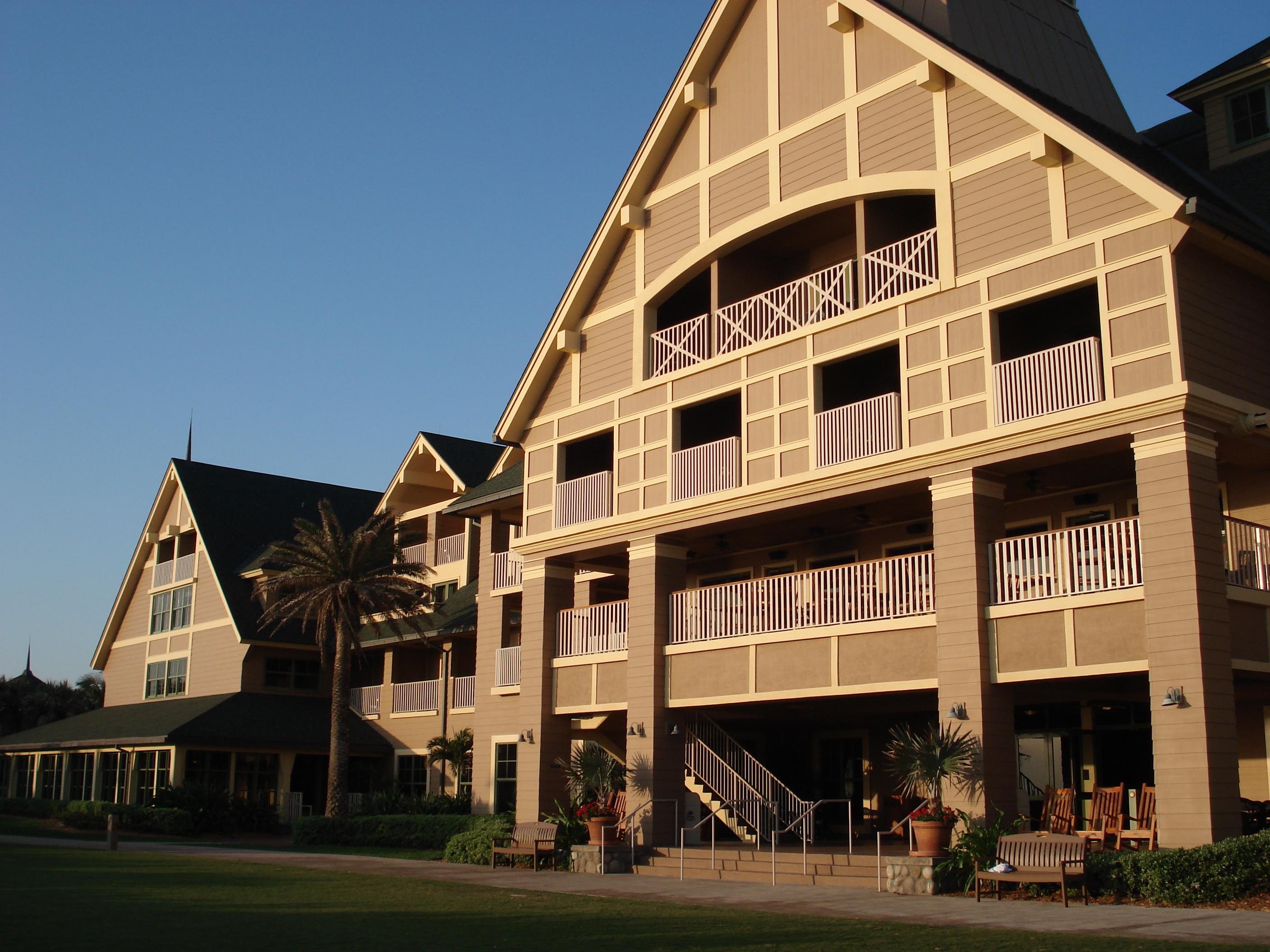
- The Inn at Disney's Vero Beach Resort
- Interactive map of the Disney's Vero Beach Resort area

General information
- Type: Resort
- Location: Wabasso Beach, Florida
- Opened: October 1, 1995
- Operator: Disney Experiences

Other information
- Number of rooms: 211

Disney's Vero Beach Resort is a Disney Vacation Club resort located eleven miles north of Vero Beach in Wabasso Beach, on State Route A1A in Florida. Established in 1995, it was the first Disney Vacation Club resort to be constructed outside the Disney theme parks.

== Amenities ==
Disney's Vero Beach Resort is located on the beachfront. The property includes a small waterpark, spa, grill, and a bar.

== Closures ==
In March 2020, Vero Beach Resort had unscheduled closure due to the COVID-19 pandemic. It reopened on June 15, 2020.
