= Disney's Fort Wilderness Resort & Campground =

Resort at Walt Disney World

Coordinates: 28.407431°N 81.558563°W

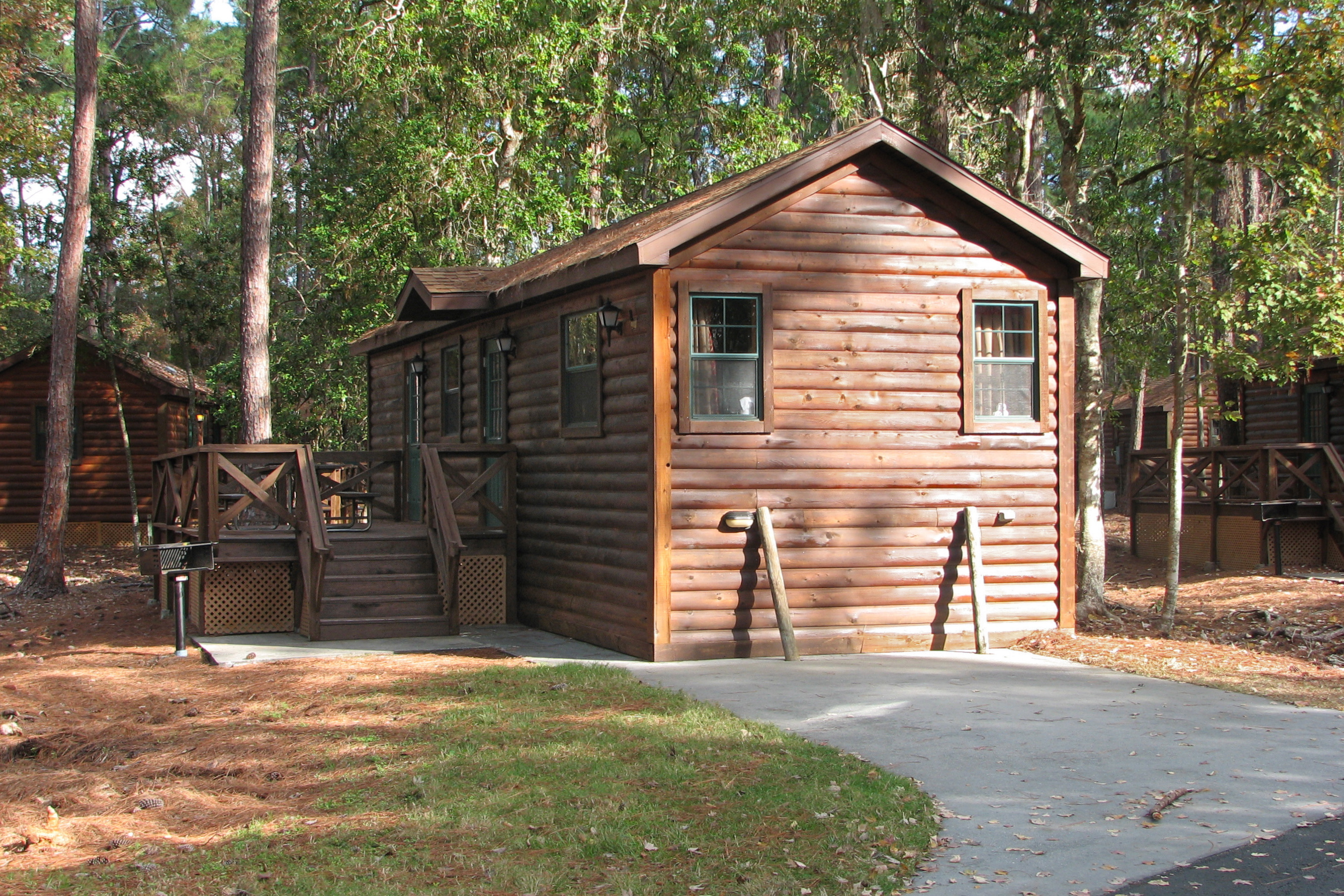
- Cabin at Disney's Fort Wilderness Resort & Campground
- Interactive map of the Disney's Fort Wilderness Resort & Campground area

General information
- Type: Resort
- Location: Magic Kingdom Resort Area
- Opened: November 19, 1971

Disney's Fort Wilderness Resort & Campground is a themed camping resort located in the Magic Kingdom Resort Area at the Walt Disney World Resort, adjacent to Bay Lake, near Disney's Wilderness Lodge. It opened in November 1971. It also formerly contained Disney's River Country, a water park which closed on November 2, 2001. It is in the municipality of Bay Lake.

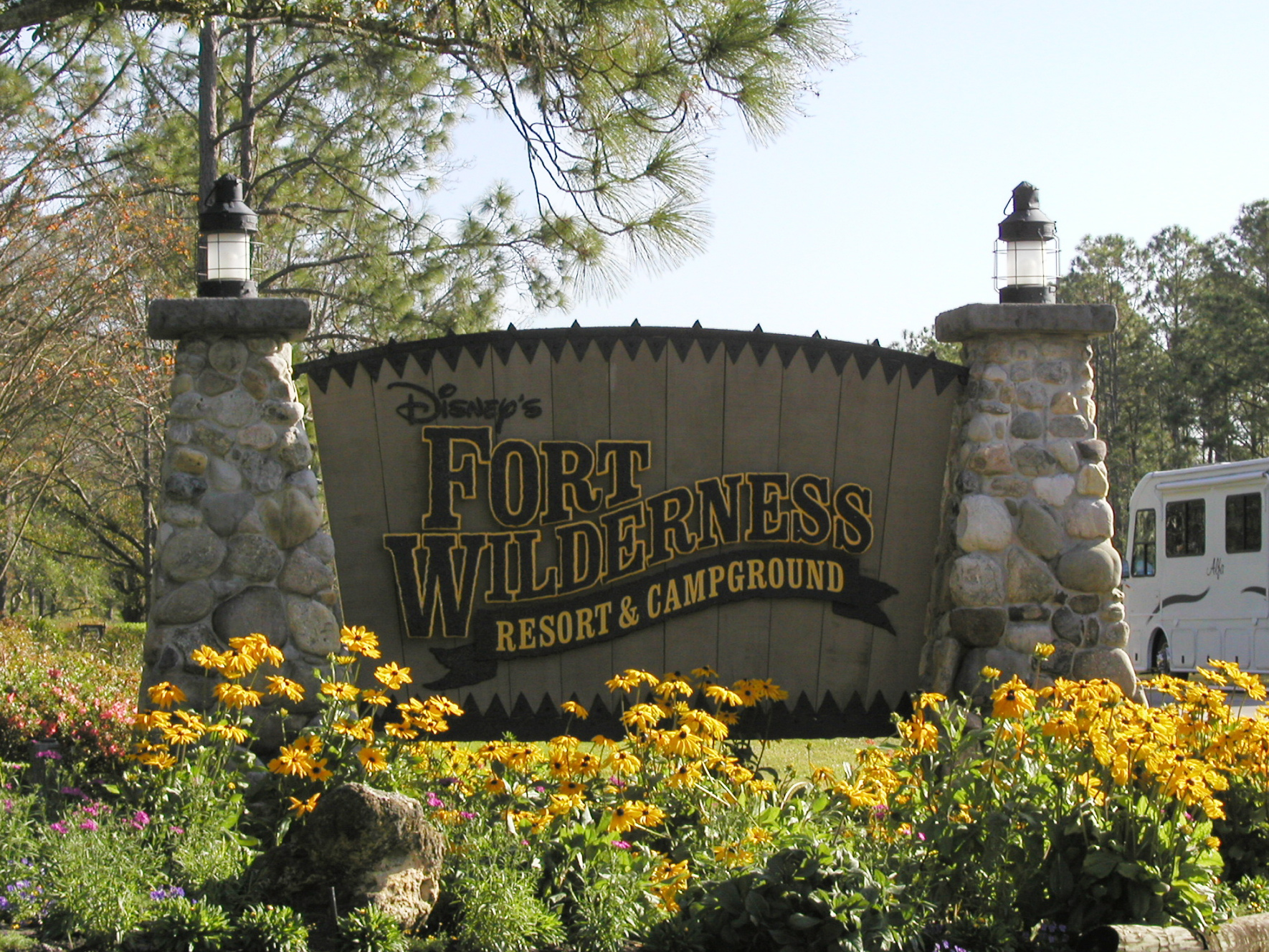
Disney's Fort Wilderness Resort & Campground sign

From late 1973 to early 1980, the Fort Wilderness Railroad, a 3.5-mile (5.6 km), 2 ft 6 in (762 mm) narrow-gauge heritage railroad, provided transportation to the resort's various campsites, as well as to the nearby River Country water park. A new Disney Vacation Club tower, Disney Lakeshore Lodge, is set to open along the shores of Bay Lake at Fort Wilderness on July 1, 2027.

== Bibliography ==
- Bashor, Amy (2016). Camping Disney: The Fort Wilderness Field Guide (1st ed.). Theme Park Press. ISBN 978-1-941500-89-7.
- Leaphart, David (2014a). Walt Disney World Railroads Part 1: Fort Wilderness Railroad (1st ed.). Steel Wheel on Steel Rail Studio. ISBN 978-1-5008-0522-7.
