= Disney's Grand Californian Hotel & Spa =

Hotel at Disneyland Resort

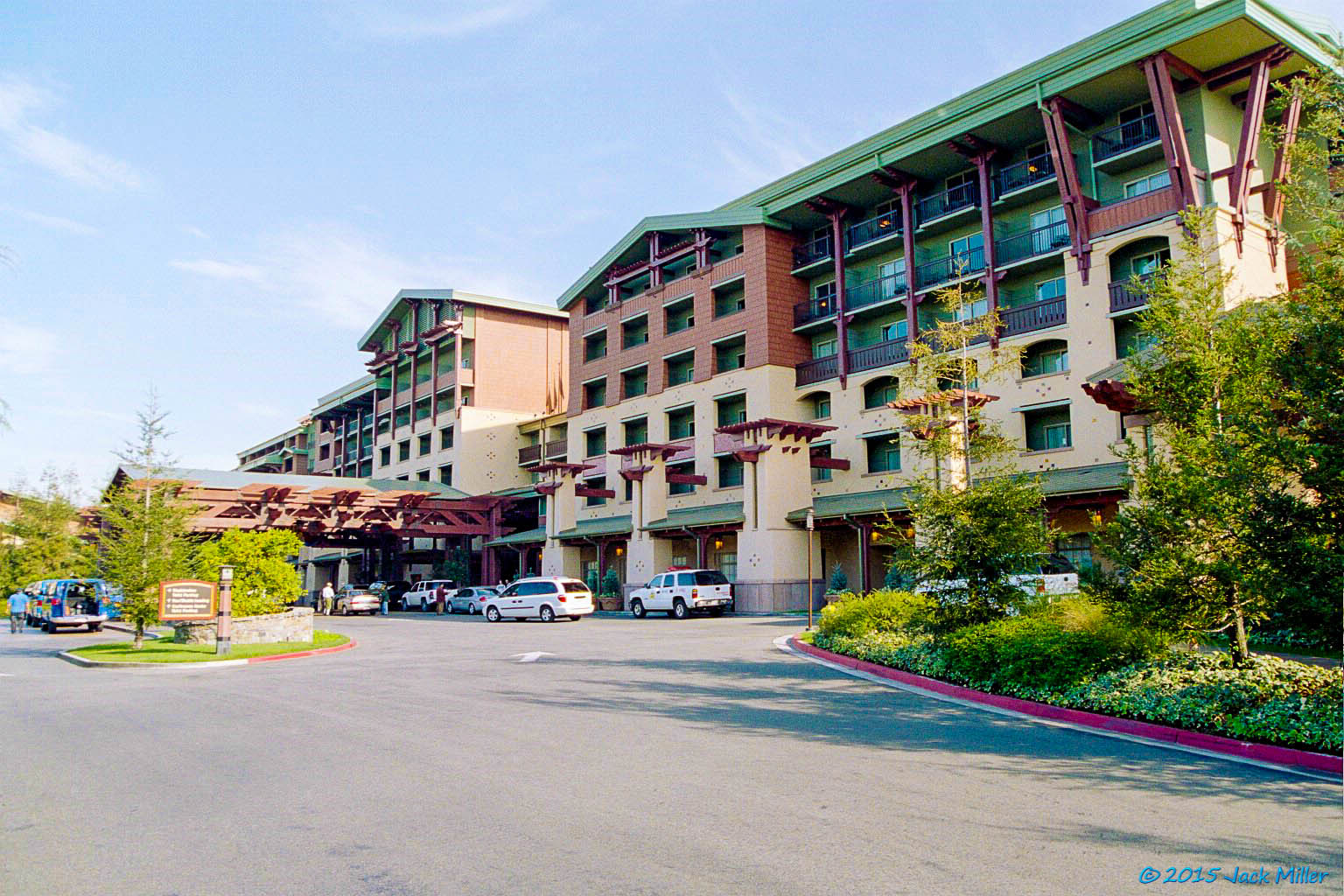
- The hotel's entrance

General information
- Type: Resort
- Location: Disneyland Resort, Anaheim, California, U.S.
- Opened: January 2, 2001; 25 years ago
- Operator: Disney Experiences

Other information
- Number of rooms: 948
- Number of suites: 44

Website
- Official website

Disney's Grand Californian Hotel & Spa is a hotel located at the Disneyland Resort in Anaheim, California. The hotel was constructed as part of a major expansion of the Disneyland Resort in 2001. It was constructed and operated by The Walt Disney Company. The hotel was designed in the American Craftsman style of architecture. It also features a Disney Vacation Club wing that opened on September 23, 2009. The hotel has a private entrance to Disney California Adventure. In 2017, Disney remodeled the rooms, along with the lobby.

== Description ==
The hotel was designed by architect Peter Dominick of 4240 Architecture Inc. (formerly part of Urban Design Group Inc.). It has 948 rooms, in addition to 44 suites and 71 villas.

Craftsman style buildings often use garden themes, which was Peter Dominick's inspiration for the hotel's forest theme. The reception hall is based on the interior of the Swedenborgian Church in San Francisco, increased in scale to accommodate the large reception desk. The central lobby has a large fireplace and arching beams overhead, and is furnished with chairs and sofas arranged around small coffee tables.

Many of the items found throughout the hotel have been crafted by modern practitioners of the Arts and Crafts style, and some early Roycroft items are on display in the lobby.

Some of the hotel's rooms are tributes to various Craftsman-era architects and designers such as Frank Lloyd Wright, Charles Rennie MacKintosh, and the Gladding, McBean Company.

Its name is based on Disney's Grand Floridian Resort & Spa, its sister resort and Walt Disney World's flagship resort hotel.

The Disneyland Monorail passes through the hotel on its way to the Downtown Disney Monorail station. The Monorail does not stop at the hotel.

=== History ===
The hotel opened on January 2, 2001, as a part of the parks expansion for Disneyland Resort.

On September 18, 2007, the Disneyland Resort announced an expansion of Disney's Grand Californian Hotel & Spa that would increase accommodations by more than 30 percent and include the first Disney Vacation Club villas in Anaheim.

The 2.5-acre (10,000 m^{2}) expansion on the hotel's south side added more than 200 hotel rooms and 50 two-bedroom equivalent vacation villas and marked the West Coast debut of Disney Vacation Club, Disney's vacation ownership program. During this expansion and renovation, a swimming pool was added as well as a 300 space underground parking garage. Peter Dominick designed the ambitious expansion to complement the existing hotel. The project was completed in September 2009.

With the completion of this major expansion, Disney's Grand Californian Hotel & Spa became the fourth-largest hotel in Orange County.

==== The Villas at Disney's Grand Californian Hotel ====
The Disney Vacation Club villas, added as part of the hotel's expansion, include kitchens, living and dining areas and other home-like amenities. The guest rooms feature the same decor as the hotel rooms in the original structure and continue the Californian Craftsman motif.

== Napa Rose ==
Napa Rose

Restaurant information
- Established: 2001
- Owner: Disney Experiences
- Head chef: Andrew Sutton
- Food type: California cuisine
- Coordinates: 33°48′28″N 117°55′17″W
- Seating capacity: 120 (dining room); 40 (patio); 70 (bar and lounge); 12 (bar patio)
- Reservations: Recommended but not required

Napa Rose is a restaurant in Disney's Grand Californian Hotel & Spa that opened in 2001 as part of Disney's expansion of its Anaheim property from one theme park (Disneyland) into a multi-park resort complex. It specializes in California cuisine and has a Napa Valley wine theme. The restaurant's design is inspired by Scottish Art Nouveau designer Charles Rennie Mackintosh.

Napa Rose's head chef, Andrew Sutton, formerly of the Rosewood Mansion on Turtle Creek's restaurant in Dallas, was hired from Auberge du Soleil in Napa Valley, and former general manager and sommelier Michael Jordan was hired from the Patina Restaurant Group. Disney hired Sutton and Jordan in order to raise the credibility of its food and wine program. The restaurant has won multiple awards from different organizations, such as the Wine Spectator, Zagat, The Southern California Restaurant Writers and the Orange County Business Journal.

== Craftsman Bar & Grill ==
Craftsman Bar & Grill, formerly known as White Water Snacks, is the refurbished quick service restaurant located in Disney's Grand Californian Hotel & Spa. Initially opened in 2001 with the hotel, it re-opened in 2019 under this new name with an expanded pool deck and revised menu.

== Tenaya Stone Spa ==
Tenaya Stone Spa is the full-service spa located inside Disney's Grand Californian Hotel & Spa at the Disneyland Resort. The 6,000-square-foot facility opened in September 2021, replacing the former Mandara Spa.

The name Tenaya can be interpreted as "to dream" in the indigenous culture of the Yosemite Valley. The spa's namesake stone was sourced from indigenous ancestral lands with the assistance of a Miwok elder and her family, descendants of Chief Tenaya of the Ahwahnechee people, who blessed and gifted the stone to Disney.

Services include massages, facials, body treatments, and salon services. The spa is open to all guests, not exclusively hotel guests.

== Incidents ==
At about 3:00 am on December 28, 2005, a Christmas tree in the main lobby caught fire after electric maintenance workers replaced lights on the tree. All 2,300 guests at the hotel were evacuated within four minutes. The fire was contained by the hotel's sprinkler system and by the Anaheim Fire Department. Two guests were treated for minor injuries, one of which was a severe headache. Guests were returned to their rooms by 7:00 am.

On April 27, 2017, a 32-year-old woman died in an apparent suicide in her hotel room at the hotel during a work trip.

== Gallery ==
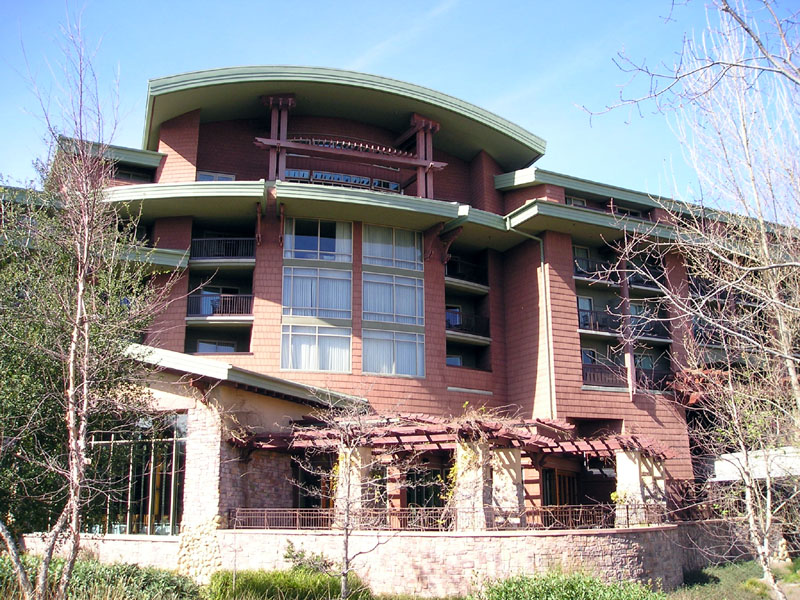
View of hotel from Disney California Adventure

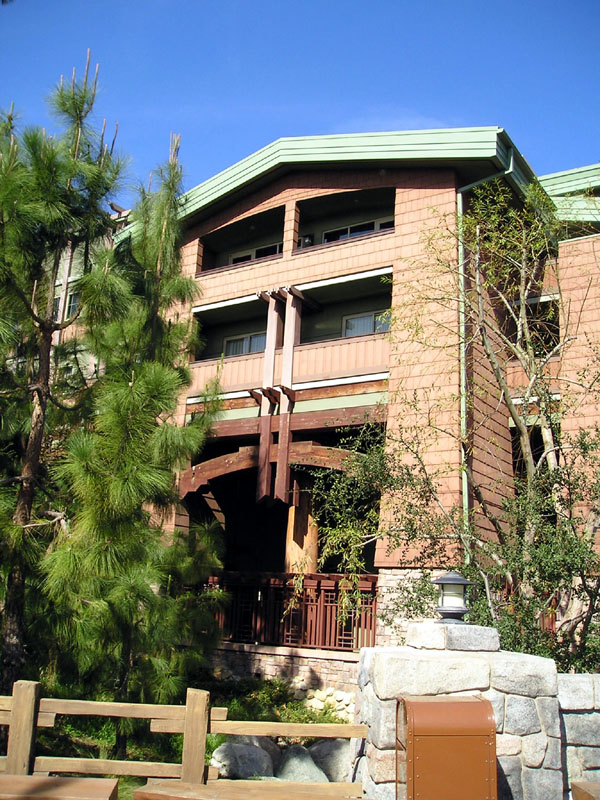
Arts & Crafts architecture of the hotel

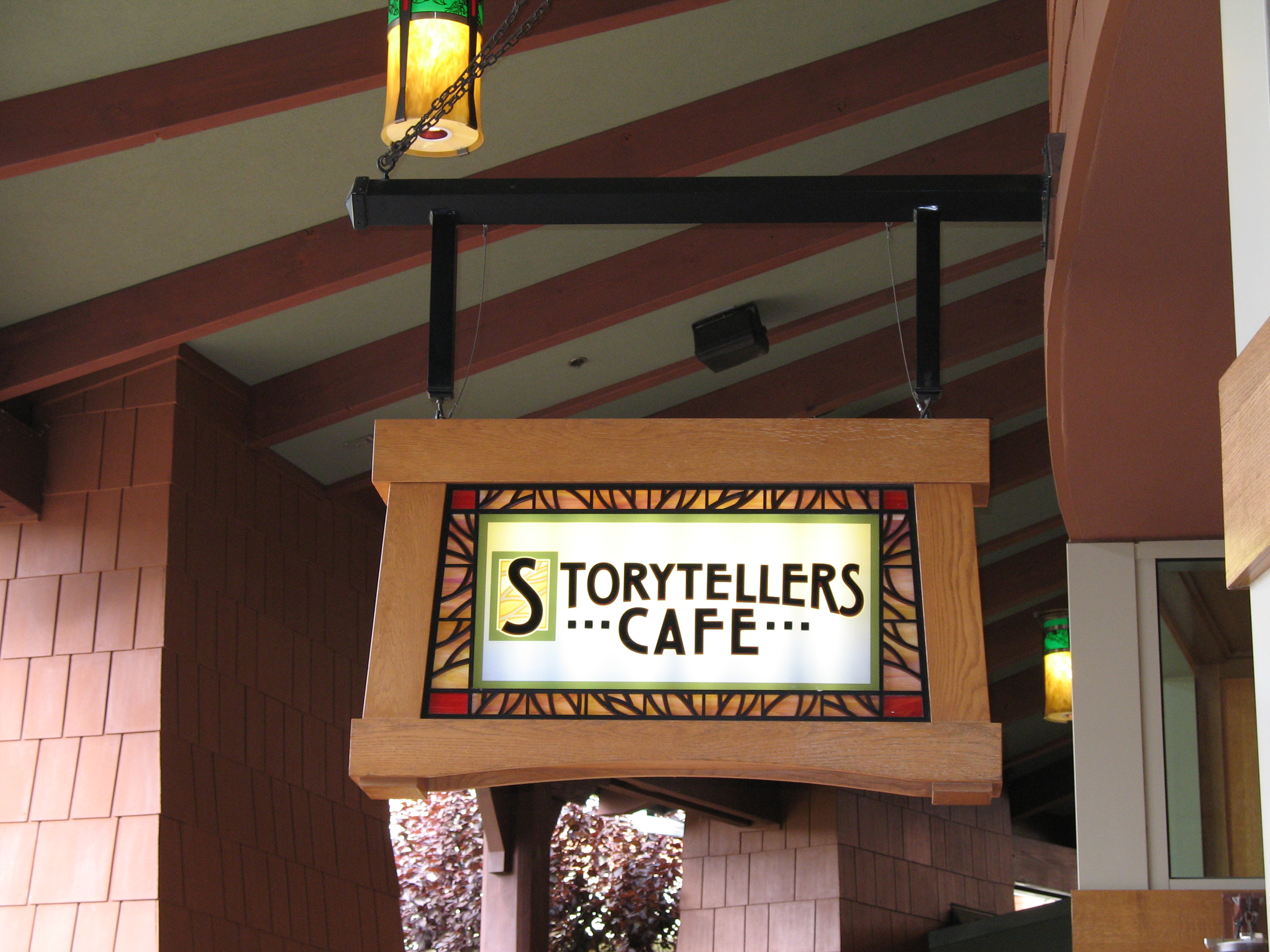
Storytellers Cafe entrance

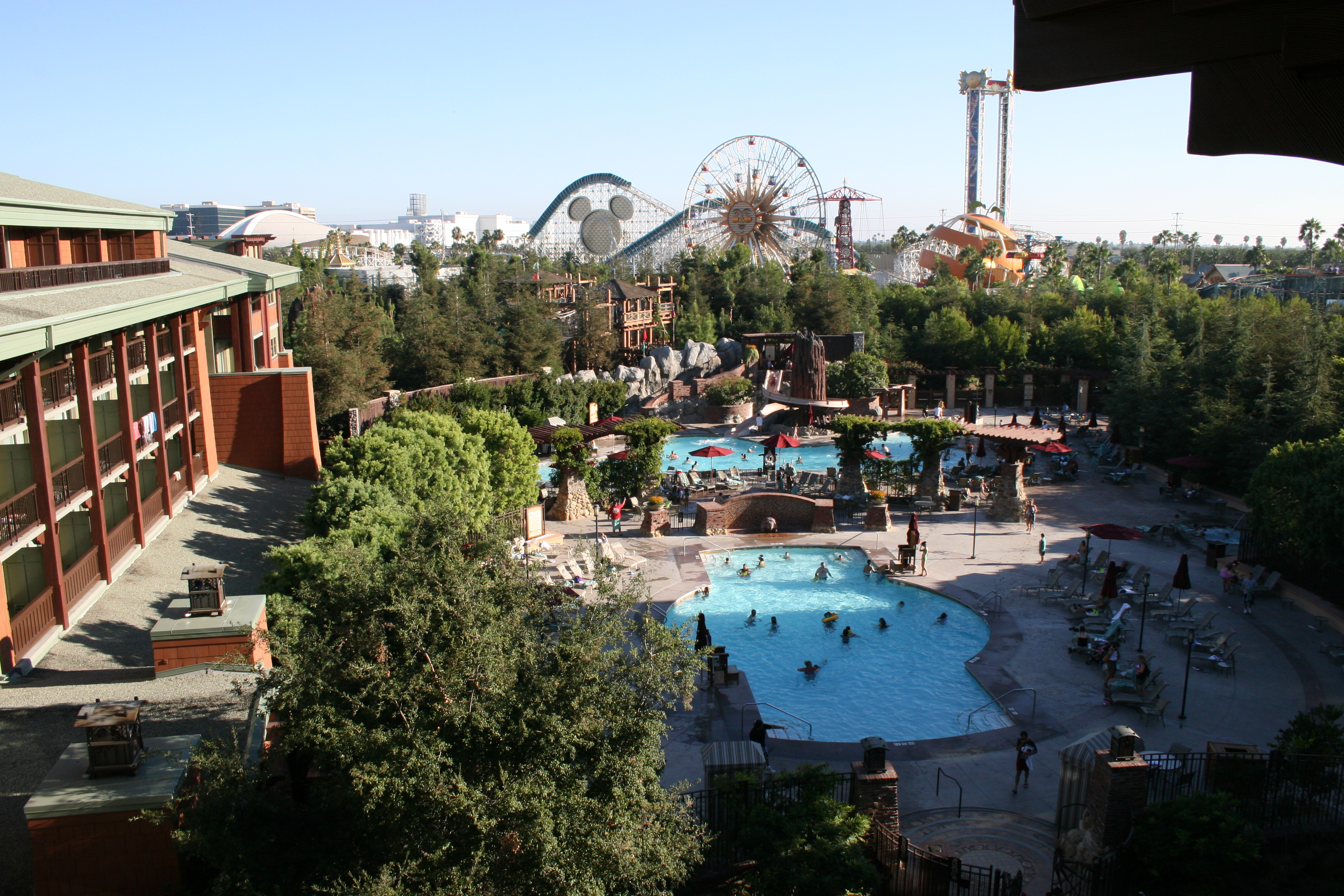
A view of the three pools and Disney California Adventure in 2006
