= Disney Vacation Club =

Timeshare program for Disney resorts

Disney Vacation Development, LLC
- Trade name: Disney Vacation Club
- Type: Subsidiary
- Industry: Real estate
- Founded: December 20, 1991; 34 years ago (in Bay Lake, Florida)
- Headquarters: Celebration, Florida, U.S.
- Number of locations: 18 (2025)
- Key people: Natacha Rafalski (president, Disney Signature Experiences); Bill Diercksen (SVP & GM, Disney Vacation Club)
- Owner: The Walt Disney Company
- Parent: Disney Signature Experiences
- Website: Official website

Disney Vacation Development, LLC, operating as Disney Vacation Club (DVC), is a vacation timeshare program of the Walt Disney Company. The program allows members to purchase a real estate interest in a DVC resort through a points-based system. There are an estimated 250,000 members. DVC operates under the Disney Signature Experiences segment within the company’s Disney Experiences division.

DVC offers ownership interests in 13 resort properties located at Walt Disney World Resort in Orlando, Florida and 2 at Disneyland Resort in Anaheim, California, along with 3 stand-alone properties including Aulani in Hawaii, Disney's Vero Beach Resort in Florida, and Disney's Hilton Head Island Resort in South Carolina. Units are sold under vacation ownership plans and are used by the company as hotel accommodations when not occupied by DVC members.

== History ==
The first Disney Vacation Club property, initially known as the Disney Vacation Club Resort (renamed Disney's Old Key West Resort in January 1996), opened on December 20, 1991 at Walt Disney World. In 1991, Disney registered its timeshare plan with the state of Hawaii but did not establish an escrow agreement, allowing the company to advertise—but not sell—timeshare interests in the state. On January 17, 1992, Disney Vacation Club was incorporated as Disney Vacation Development, Inc.

On March 30, 1993, Disney announced plans for a 440-unit timeshare resort approximately 95 miles (153 km) southeast of Walt Disney World, with construction beginning on July 28, 1994. The property opened on October 1, 1995, as the Vacation Club Resort at Vero Beach, Florida, later renamed Disney's Vero Beach Resort. This was followed by the opening of Disney's Hilton Head Island Resort on March 1, 1996, in Hilton Head Island, South Carolina.

In 2007, Disney's Animal Kingdom Villas opened its first phase. By 2008, Disney had announced two additional timeshare developments at Walt Disney World: Bay Lake Tower and Treehouse Villas, both located at existing resort hotels and scheduled to open in 2009.

On October 3, 2007, Disney announced plans to develop a vacation club resort on 21 acres (8.5 ha) in the Ko Olina Resort area on the island of Oahu, Hawaii. The project included both DVC units and standard hotel rooms, and Disney completed regulatory steps required to sell timeshare interests in Hawaii. The resort opened as Aulani on August 28, 2011.

In early 2011, Disney purchased land near National Harbor, Maryland, with plans to develop a resort near Washington, D.C. In November 2011, the company announced that the proposed 500-room project had been canceled.

In November 2019, Disney filed plans for a new Disney Vacation Club tower at the Disneyland Hotel. The tower opened on September 28, 2023.

In 2021, Disney announced an expansion of the Villas at Disney's Grand Floridian Resort & Spa, adding approximately 200 studio units. The expansion was completed on June 23, 2022.

Plans for a new Disney Vacation Club tower at Disney's Polynesian Village Resort were announced in 2022. In May 2024, the project was named Island Tower at Disney's Polynesian Village Resort, which opened on December 17, 2024.

In November 2024, Disney announced that the previously proposed Reflections would be developed instead as Disney Lakeshore Lodge, a 10-story resort planned to open in 2027 at Walt Disney World Resort with approximately 900 rooms, the company's largest development to date.

== Membership ==
To become a DVC member, an individual must purchase a one-time real estate interest in a DVC resort and pay annual dues. These interests are sold as either a ground lease or a term-for-years arrangement. DVC interests may not be sold in Nebraska. Disney offers financing in the form of loans to purchasers.

DVC membership contracts include a right of first refusal clause. Beginning in mid-2015, the company implemented a nonjudicial foreclosure process in Florida, requiring in-person participation at auctions conducted by the Orange County Clerk of Court. Disney recognizes two approved resale companies: Fidelity Resales and, since 2016, Vacatia.

Beginning in 2011, Disney restricted certain benefits for purchasers of DVC interests on the secondary market, including access to Disney Cruise Line and Adventures by Disney bookings. In April 2016, Disney ended the extension of Membership Extras benefits to resale purchasers. Further resale restrictions were announced in 2019, limiting the use of points purchased on the secondary market to specific resorts depending on the contract.

In addition to Disney-owned resorts, members may access participating non-Disney-owned destinations through exchange arrangements with Interval International.

== Locations ==
Locations of Disney Vacation Club properties

Property	Location	Units	Opened	Ref.
The Villas at Disney's Grand Californian Hotel	Disneyland Resort, Anaheim, California	71	September 23, 2009	
The Villas at Disneyland Hotel	Disneyland Resort, Anaheim, California	340	September 28, 2023	
Bay Lake Tower	Walt Disney World, Orlando, Florida	300	August 4, 2009	
Animal Kingdom Villas	Walt Disney World, Orlando, Florida	708	July 2007	
Beach Club Villas	Walt Disney World, Orlando, Florida	282	July 1, 2002	
BoardWalk Villas	Walt Disney World, Orlando, Florida	530	July 1, 1996	
Polynesian Villas & Bungalows	Walt Disney World, Orlando, Florida	380	April 1, 2015	
Island Tower at Disney's Polynesian Villas & Bungalows	Walt Disney World, Orlando, Florida	360	December 17, 2024	
The Villas at Disney's Grand Floridian Resort & Spa	Walt Disney World, Orlando, Florida	147	October 23, 2013	
Boulder Ridge Villas	Walt Disney World, Orlando, Florida	181	January 2001	
Copper Creek Villas and Cabins	Walt Disney World, Orlando, Florida	185	July 17, 2017	
The Cabins at Fort Wilderness	Walt Disney World, Orlando, Florida	300	July 1, 2024	
Disney Lakeshore Lodge	Walt Disney World, Orlando, Florida	967	July 1, 2027 (planned)	
Old Key West Resort	Walt Disney World, Orlando, Florida	761	December 20, 1991	
Saratoga Springs Resort & Spa	Walt Disney World, Orlando, Florida	888	May 17, 2004	
Riviera Resort	Walt Disney World, Orlando, Florida	300	December 16, 2019	
Vero Beach Resort	Vero Beach, Florida	211	October 1, 1995	
Hilton Head Island Resort	Hilton Head Island, South Carolina	123	March 1, 1996	
Aulani	Ko Olina, Oahu, Hawaii	460	August 28, 2011	

== See also ==
- Timeshare
