= Disney's Wilderness Lodge =

Hotel at Walt Disney World

Coordinates: 28.409390°N 81.572615°W

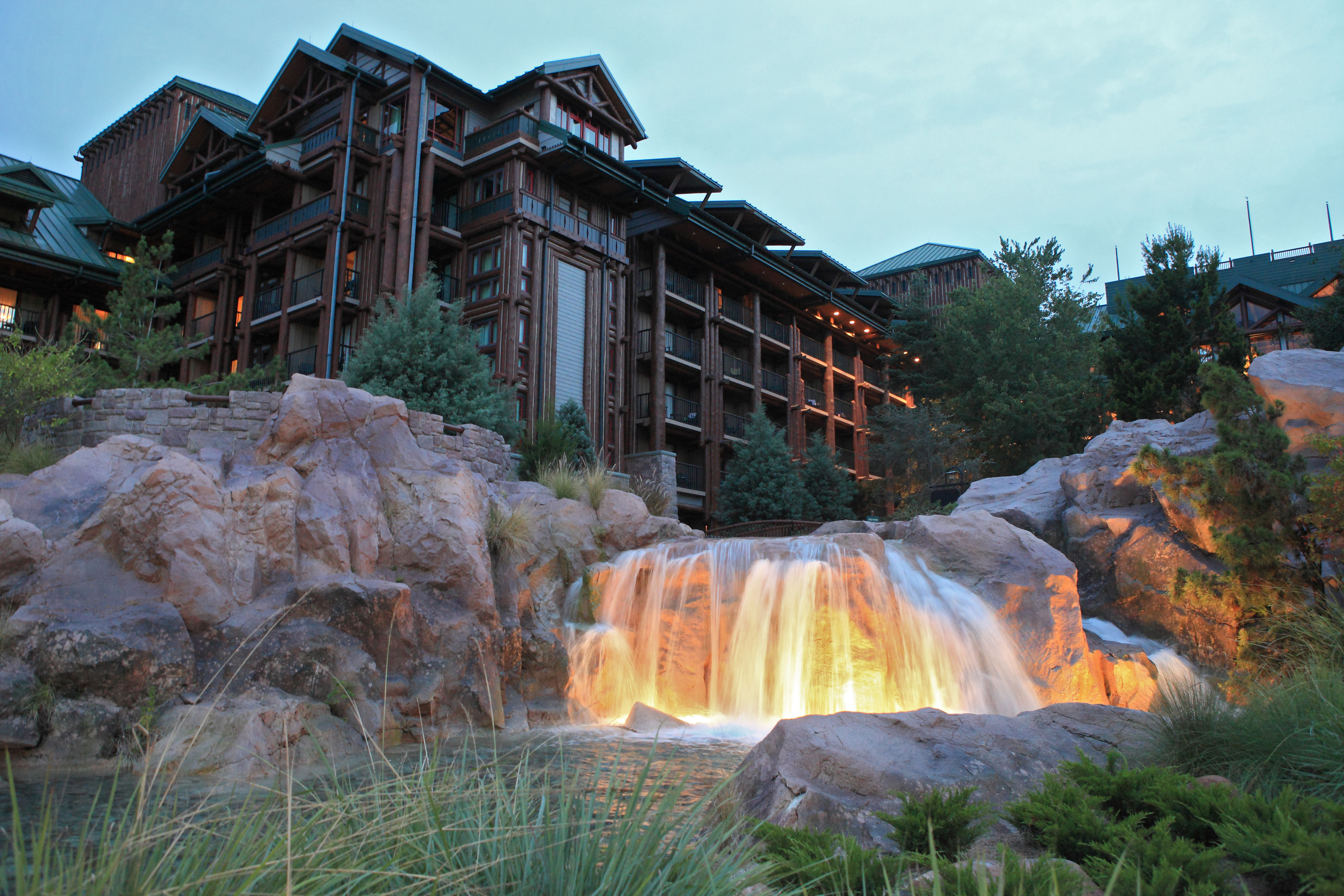
- Disney's Wilderness Lodge at dusk

General information
- Type: Resort
- Location: Magic Kingdom Resort Area
- Opened: May 28, 1994

Other information
- Number of rooms: 729

Disney's Wilderness Lodge is a resort hotel located at the Walt Disney World Resort in Bay Lake, Florida. Opened on May 28, 1994, the resort is owned and operated by Disney Parks, Experiences, and Products. Disney's Wilderness Lodge is located in the Magic Kingdom Resort Area on Bay Lake. The resort is located near Disney's Fort Wilderness Resort & Campground. A similarly themed resort, Disney's Grand Californian Hotel & Spa, is located at the Disneyland Resort in California.

There are two Disney Vacation Club properties located at Disney's Wilderness Lodge. The Boulder Ridge Villas at Disney's Wilderness Lodge opened on November 15, 2000. The Copper Creek Villas & Cabins at Disney's Wilderness Lodge opened on July 17, 2017.

== Resort ==
Disney's Wilderness Lodge hotel was designed by Peter Dominick. It is modeled after the atmosphere of the national parks of the western United States and features both natural and Native American elements. The main building was modeled after the Old Faithful Inn in Yellowstone National Park. An artificial geyser and hot springs are located on the resort grounds.

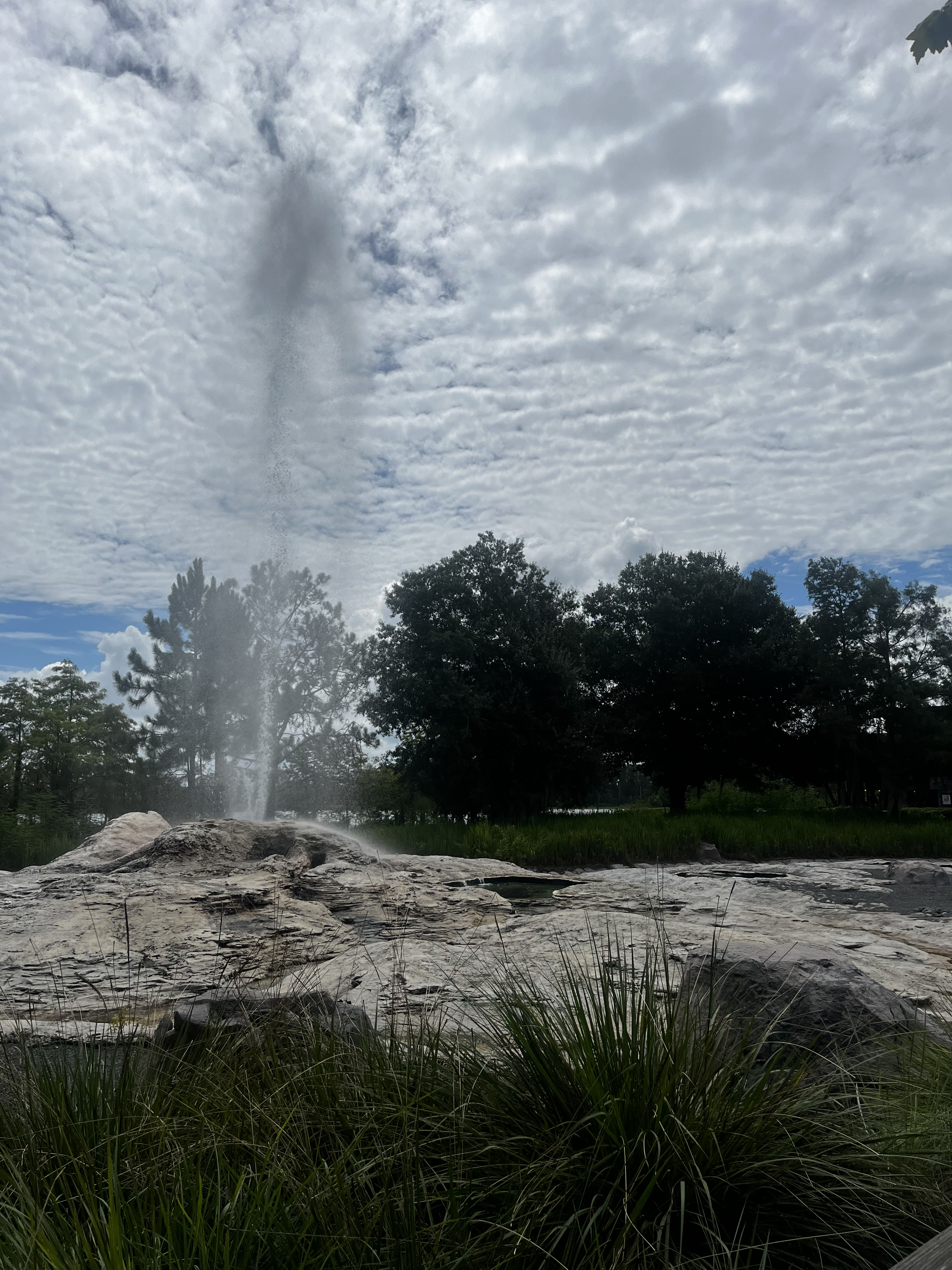
Fire Rock Geyser at Disney's Wilderness Lodge

The resort has eight floors of lodgepole pine imported from Oregon, as well as 55-foot authentic totem poles and an 82-foot fireplace representing the colorful rocks of the Grand Canyon. This display represents Northwestern Native American artifacts, myths, legends, and stories. The Lodge is a 4-star deluxe Walt Disney World resort. Lodge guests have access to restaurants, a spa and fitness center, themed pools, hot tubs, a kids' zone and babysitting center, and fun and educational activities for adults and children.

Boat transportation is available to the Magic Kingdom, Disney's Contemporary Resort, and Disney's Fort Wilderness Resort & Campground.

In November 2007, the resort received a designation as part of the Florida Green Lodging Program.

== Amenities ==
=== Dining ===
Storybook Dining at Artist Point is a Snow White and the Seven Dwarfs character meet-and-greet offering classic American food.

Whispering Canyon Cafe is an Old West-themed eatery featuring all-you-can-eat skillets and wooden stick horses.

Geyser Point Bar & Grill is a waterfront bar and grill.

Roaring Fork is a quick-service eatery serving popular breakfast, lunch, and dinner dishes.

Territory Lounge is the resort's bar, offering craft brews and wine, as well as appetizers.

=== Recreation ===
Copper Creek Springs Pool is the resort's main and largest pool, featuring a 67-foot waterslide.

Boulder Ridge Cove Pool is the second and smallest pool at the resort.

Buttons and Bells Arcade is the resort's arcade, featuring various games.

The resort also hosts campfire activities, movies under the stars and guided fishing excursions as well as bike and motorized boat rentals.

=== Transportation ===
Disney's Wilderness Lodge is serviced by Disney Transport's bus and watercraft services. The bus transportation is available to all four theme parks, both water parks, Disney Springs, and Disney's Fort Wilderness Resort & Campground. Meanwhile, the watercraft service is exclusive to Magic Kingdom.

== Boulder Ridge Villas ==
Originally known as The Villas at Disney's Wilderness Lodge, a Disney Vacation Club timeshare resort on the site was announced in 1998, and the property first accepted guests in November 2000. The Boulder Ridge Villas at Disney's Wilderness Lodge are adjacent to Disney's Wilderness Lodge, whose design is based on the National Park lodges of America's western states. The Vacation Club Villas are themed after the antecedent lodgings built by railroad workers in the late 19th century. The main building for the villas has railroad artwork and memorabilia on display, including two train cars from Walt Disney's rideable miniature Carolwood Pacific Railroad. The accommodations include Studio units with a kitchenette, as well as one- and two-bedroom villas with a larger kitchen and living space. In late 2015, Disney began an extensive building project to expand the Villas with waterside units similar to those found over the water at Disney's Polynesian Village Resort, as well as recreation and dining facilities.

== Copper Creek Villas & Cabins ==
Copper Creek Villas & Cabins opened in the summer of 2017 as the second DVC property at the resort, taking over the southern wing of the main resort building, and adding unique standalone Cascade Cabins built along the waterfront. The property consists of 184 total units, with a possible maximum of 220 rooms when accounting for lock-off two-bedroom units: 42 dedicated studios, 20 dedicated one-bedroom, 56 dedicated two-bedroom, 36 two-bedroom lock-off units, four three-bedroom Grand Villas, and 26 Cascade Cabins. Copper Creek Villas & Cabins is a separate association from Boulder Ridge, and accordingly has a separate contract expiration, point chart, and budget, although the property shares amenities with the main resort and Boulder Ridge Villas.

== Gallery ==
Disney's Wilderness Lodge and Villas

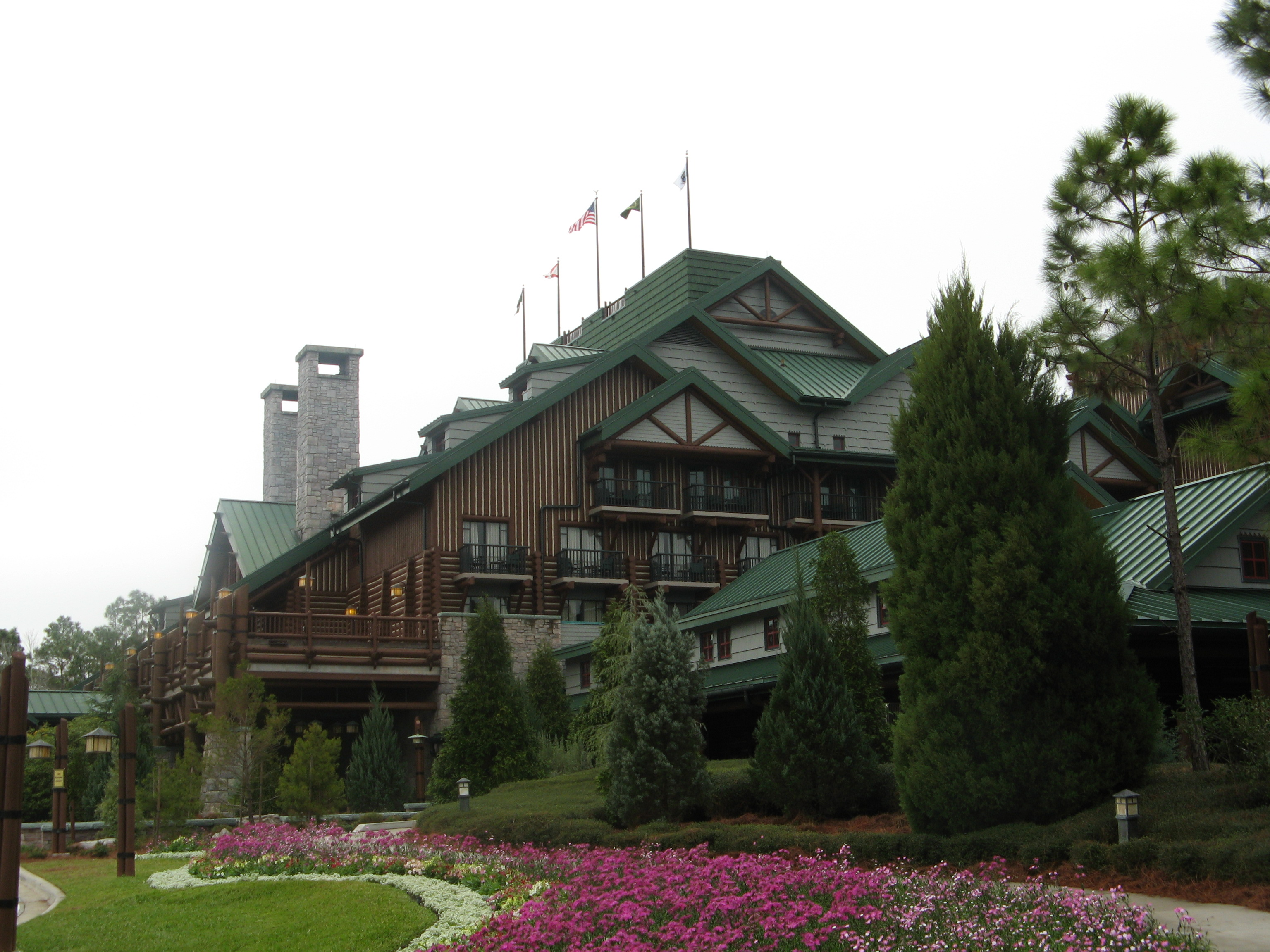
Front exterior

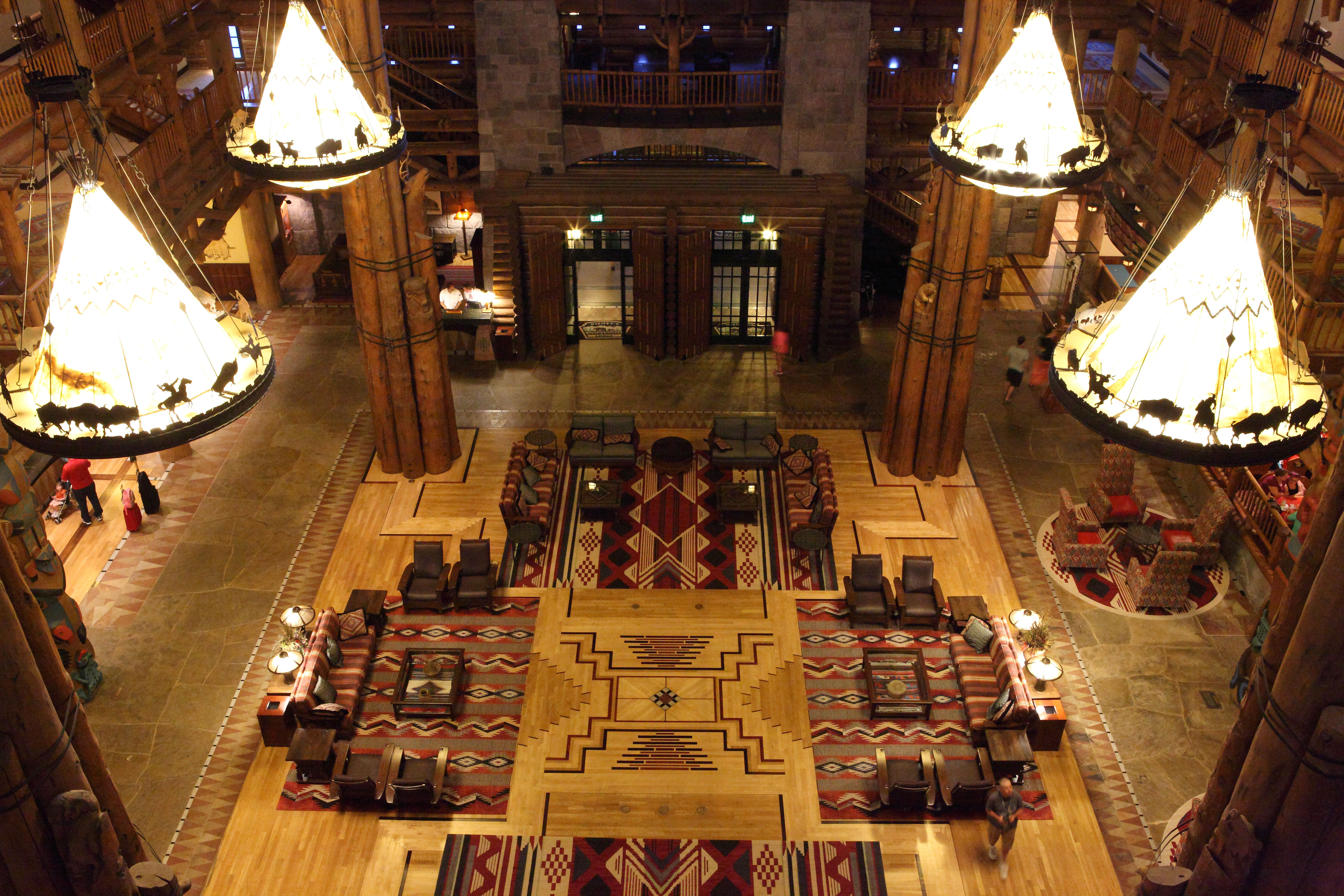
Lodge lobby

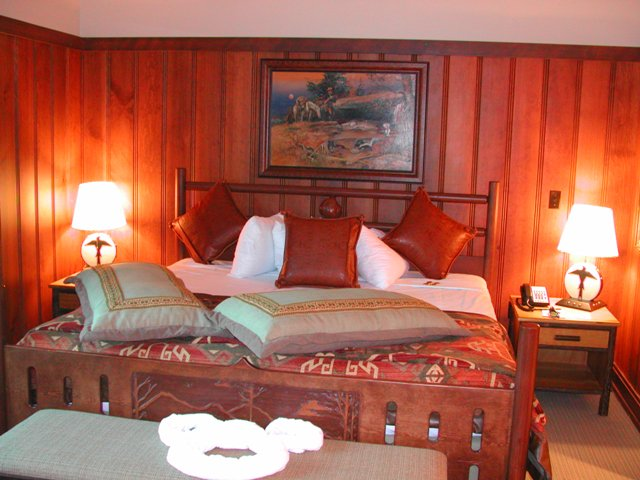
The Yosemite Suite

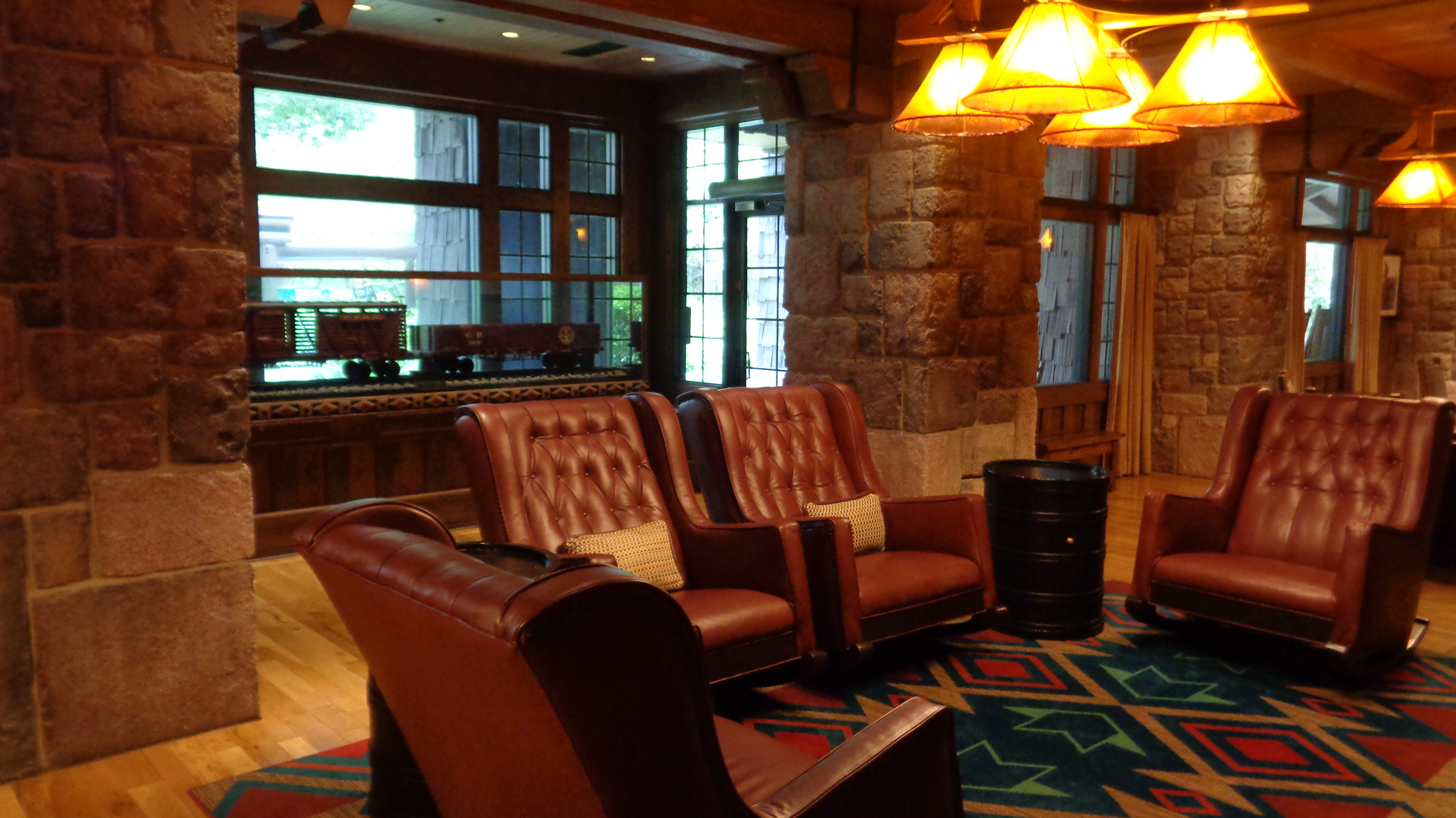
The Carolwood Pacific Railroad Room
