= Disney utilidor system =

Utility tunnel system at Magic Kingdom

Disney Utilidor System
- Image of the utilidor system taken by The Walt Disney Company along the tunnel underneath Cinderella Castle
- Interactive map of the Disney Utilidor System area
- Alternative names: Utilidors
- Etymology: Utility Corridors

General information
- Status: Operating
- Type: Utility tunnel system
- Location: Walt Disney World, Magic Kingdom Drive, Bay Lake, Florida, United States
- Coordinates: 28.420965°N 81.581347°W
- Construction started: 1967
- Opened: 1971
- Client: WED Enterprises
- Owner: The Walt Disney Company
- Affiliation: Disney Experiences

Height
- Roof: Magic Kingdom
- Top floor: 107 feet (33 m)

Technical details
- Grounds: 9 acres (3.6 ha)

Design and construction
- Architect: WED Enterprises
- Developer: WED Enterprises
- Known for: Management and operations of Magic Kingdom

Other information
- Parking: West Clock
- Public transit access: 56 300 303 at West Clock

In Disney theme parks, the utilidor system is a system of some of the world's largest utility tunnels, mainly for Walt Disney World's Magic Kingdom in Florida. The term utilidors is a portmanteau of utility corridors. These utility corridors are a part of Disney's "backstage" area (or behind-the-scenes), which allow Disney employees (referred to as Cast Members) to perform park support operations, such as trash removal, and for costumed performers to quickly reach their destinations out of the sight of guests to avoid ruining the illusion that is being created.

These tunnels were first built for Magic Kingdom. Smaller utilidor systems are built under the central section of Epcot's Future World, primarily beneath Spaceship Earth and Innoventions, and formerly at Pleasure Island (now The Landing section of Disney Springs). Disneyland, in California, also has a small utilidor system running throughout Tomorrowland.

== History ==
According to modern legend, Walt Disney was bothered by the sight of a cowboy walking through Disneyland's Tomorrowland en route to his post in Frontierland. He felt that such a sight was jarring and it detracted from the guest experience. Since Disneyland was small, such a tunnel system could not be feasibly implemented. When the new Florida Disney park was being planned, engineers designed utilidors to keep park operations out of guests' sight.

== Magic Kingdom utilidor system ==
The largest system of utilidors is beneath Walt Disney World's Magic Kingdom, but they are not a basement, contrary to popular belief. Because of an elevated water table, most of these tunnels were actually built at ground level, and the Magic Kingdom was built above that. All the guests of the park see streets that are elevated by one story. Parts of Fantasyland, including the Cinderella Castle, are at a third-story level. The ground's incline is so gradual that guests tend not to realize they are ascending to the second and third stories. The Magic Kingdom is built upon soil removed from what is now Seven Seas Lagoon.

The utilidors are built on 9 acres (3.6 ha), and the floor plan is a circle with a path down the middle; the tunnel walls are color-coded to make it simple for cast members to determine their location. The utilidors can be accessed from a main tunnel entrance located behind Fantasyland, or through unmarked doors throughout the theme park. Magic Kingdom cast members park about 1 mile (1.6 km) away, at West Clock parking lot, nearby Disney University, and are transported from the parking lot to the tunnel entrance via Disney Transport buses. Some shops, restaurants and attractions have direct access to the utilidors.

Cast members navigate the tunnels on foot or in battery-powered vehicles that resemble golf carts. Gasoline-powered vehicles are not allowed in the utilidors, with the exception of armored cash pickup trucks and, in extreme emergencies, ambulances.

Guests are not allowed in the utilidors, unless they purchase the "Keys to the Kingdom" tour.

== Functions ==
The utilidors have been referred to as an "underground city", the functions of which include:

- Waste removal: The Magic Kingdom uses an automated vacuum collection (AVAC) system for waste removal. Custodians remove trash from the park twenty-four hours a day, then dump it into AVAC system processors throughout the park. The trash then travels through pneumatic tubes to a central location where it is processed and compressed for transfer to a landfill or recycling plant.
- Electrical operations: The park's computer system, the Digital Animation Control Systems (DACS), is operated and monitored from control rooms in the utilidors. This system monitors everything in the park, from sound systems to attractions, Audio-Animatronic figures to parades, fire prevention and security systems to cash registers.
- Deliveries and storage warehouses: Deliveries are received, processed, and stored at the utilidors until use. This ensures that guests do not see delivery trucks, nor do they see cast members carting merchandise through the park.
- Food service: The park's cooking and prep kitchens are housed in the utilidors.
- Costuming: For years, the park's costuming department (for cast members and Audio-Animatronic figures) was located in the utilidors. Over 1.2 million costumes were housed here, making it the largest operating wardrobe department in the world. In 2005, Disney replaced this facility with a larger location in the cast members' parking lot, West Clock. The only costuming operations that remain in the utilidors today are for costumed characters.
- Cast member services: Separate locker rooms for men and women are located in the utilidors, as well as cast member cafeterias. There is also a branch of Partners Federal Credit Union, rehearsal rooms, and administrative offices.
- Emergency services: Two medical carts used by Reedy Creek EMS are housed in the utilidors and are deployed to respond to medical emergencies in Magic Kingdom.

== See also ==
- Dartford Cable Tunnel
- Underground city
- Utility vault
