= Walt Disney World Casting Center =

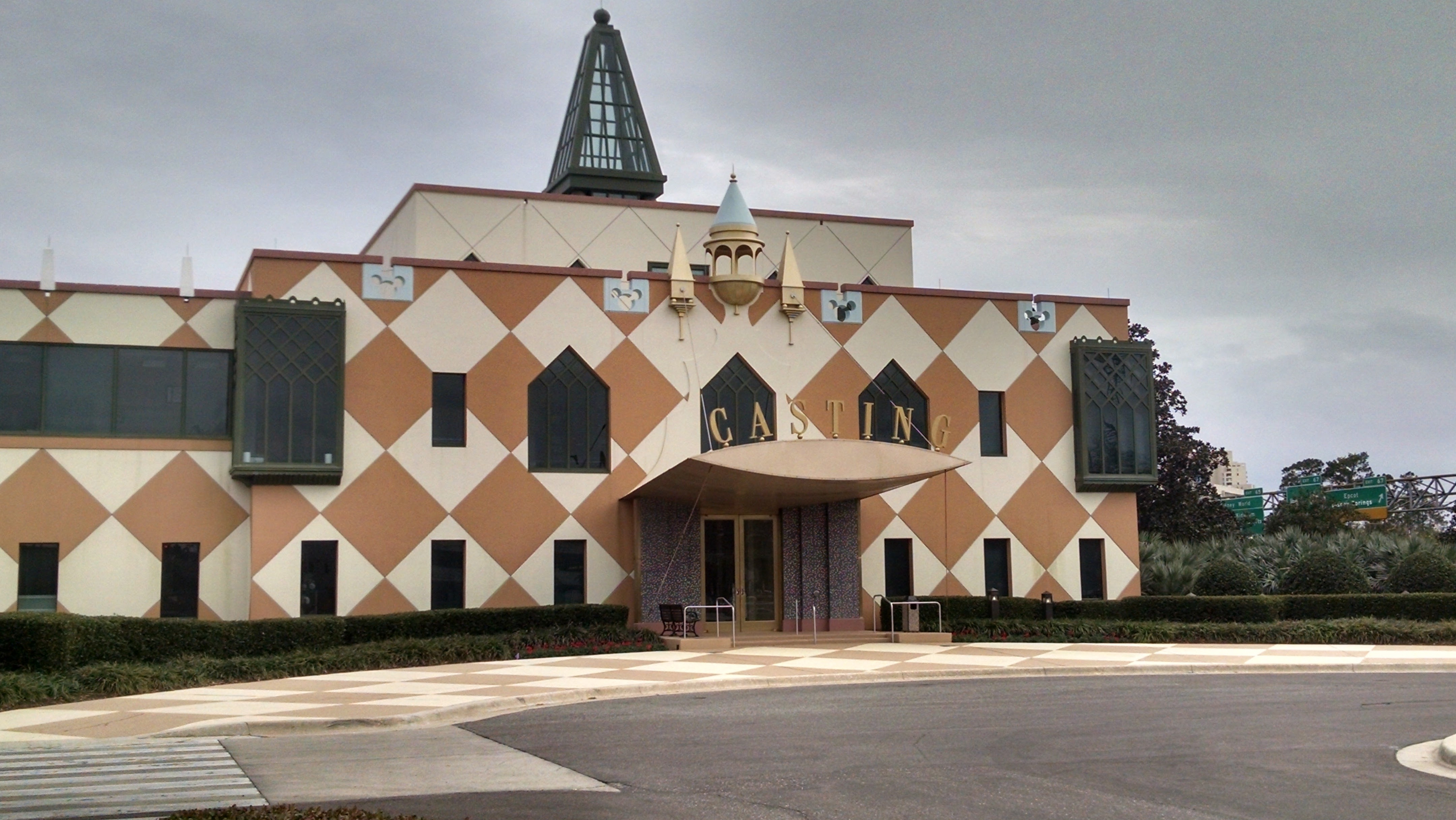
- Interactive map of the Walt Disney World Casting Center area
- Alternative names: Casting

General information
- Location: 1515 Buena Vista Drive, Lake Buena Vista, Florida, United States
- Coordinates: 28.369723°N 81.512683°W
- Opened: 1989
- Owner: The Walt Disney Company

Technical details
- Floor count: 2

Design and construction
- Architect: Robert A.M. Stern Architects
- Main contractor: H. J. High Construction

The Walt Disney World Casting Center is the official center for employment and recruiting for the Walt Disney World Resort. Designed by Robert A.M. Stern Architects and built by Orlando-based design-build company H. J. High Construction, the building opened in 1989. The Casting Center is located across from the Disney Springs complex near the Team Disney building and borders the Walt Disney World property on Interstate 4 so it can be used to advertise Walt Disney World job opportunities to commuters traveling by on the busy interstate.

Decorative landscaping and parking surround the two-story building. Large golden-framed double doors that lead into an oval lobby with a high ceiling featuring golden statues of famous animated Disney characters mark the main entrance of the building. The oval lobby leads into a long ramp lined with Disney-inspired artwork featuring paintings of its theme parks and Walt Disney. The ramp leads directly to an applicant check-in area and waiting room on the second level. Disney employees are called Cast Members in Disney's company lexicon. Newly hired Cast Members are escorted to the lower level into the new-hire processing, where their work documents are processed. New hires are then escorted to a final briefing room where they receive the official company handbook and additional documents. Finally, first-time Cast Members are scheduled for their first day of training at Disney University called "Traditions".

In addition, the building also houses offices of recruiters, conference rooms, and an executive hiring area for professional job applicants.
