= DME =

DME may refer to:

== Chemicals ==
- DME (psychedelic), 3,4-dimethoxy-beta-hydroxyphenethylamine, a psychedelic drug
- Dimethoxyethane, a solvent
- Dimethylethanolamine, a precursor molecule for C-choline
- Dimethyl ether, a fuel and an aerosol spray propellant

== Medicine ==
- Diabetic macular edema
- Durable medical equipment

== Technology ==
- Dashtop mobile equipment
- Diastatic malt extract, used in home-brewing
- Distance measuring equipment, used in aviation
- Dropping mercury electrode, used in polarography
- ICL Direct Machine Environment, an operating system

== Transport ==
- Delhi–Mumbai Expressway, in India
- Dakota, Minnesota and Eastern Railroad
- Disney's Magical Express, at Walt Disney World
- Moscow Domodedovo Airport, serving Moscow, Russia

== Other uses ==
- Design Management Europe Award
- DME Academy, in Daytona Beach, Florida
- Dubai Mercantile Exchange
- Ɗugwor language
- United States District Court for the District of Maine
- Durium Marche Estere, a sub-label of Durium Records
