= Viera High School =

Public high school in Viera, Florida, United States

Location
- 6103 Stadium Parkway; Viera, Florida 32940; United States; 28.252374°N 80.735975°W

Information
- Type: Public
- Motto: To Serve Every Student with Excellence as the Standard
- Established: August 9, 2006
- Principal: Heather LeGate
- Staff: 103.80 (FTE)
- Grades: 9–12
- Enrollment: 2,314 (2023-2024)
- Student to teacher ratio: 22.29
- Colors: Green, gold, and white
- Mascot: Hawk
- Website: https://www.brevardschools.org/o/vhs

Viera High School is a public high school located in Viera, Florida, United States. It is part of the Brevard County School District.

== History ==
It was the fifteenth high school in the district and the first of the 21st Century Classroom schools in the county. The school opened on August 9, 2006, with a student body of 961 and 64 faculty and staff.

== Campus ==
The school is located on a 50 acres (20 ha) campus with a student capacity of 2,338. The estimated budget for the project is $46,000,000. H. J. High Construction Company was contracted to design and build the facility.

== Viera High School Incident ==
On August 20, 2023, head coach Shane Staples was fired, and some students suspended, as a result of video depicting simulated sex acts occurring within a player's locker that went viral.

== Academics ==
In 2011, students averaged a score of 71 on the advanced-placement examinations, among the highest in the region.

In April 2021, U.S. News & World Report ranked VHS in the top 7% of schools in the nation, ranked 1,265 out of 18,000 US high schools.

Viera High School is ranked 100th within the state of Florida as a BEST High School by the US News and World Report Rankings.

Viera High School was ranked by the Florida Department of Education as a School for Excellence.

Viera High School raised the graduation rate to 98% in 2024, the highest in school history.

75% of Viera High School student graduate with Career and College Acceleration.

Viera High offers over 20 Advanced Placement college level classes and plans to offer additional classes in the coming years. 697 Advanced Placement exams given in 2024 to students to earn college credit while at Viera High School.

The School also provides multiple academic programs:

- ACAD (Academy for Communication, Art + Design)
- Broadcast TV Program
- Business Academy
- Dental Aide Program
- Dual enrollment
- The Early Childhood Education Program
- JROTC
- VHS Carpentry Program
- Exercise Science Program
- Web Application Development & Programming

== TV Production Program ==
Since 2006, Viera High School’s TV Production class has produced the largely student-run VTV News program, providing hands-on experience in journalism, video editing, and production. VTV News has earned several awards at the Florida Scholastic Press Association (FSPA) state competitions, including three Best of the Best awards and seven All-Florida awards in 2019.

== Athletics ==
The school fields teams in 16 different sports including Football, Baseball, Cross Country, and Volleyball. Including two state championships for the girls' golf team in 2010 and 2014.

The girls won the school's 4A state championship in soccer in 2014-15 & again in the 2015–16 season.

In 2017, the football team competes in the 7A class.

Men's Cross Country won 4A State Championship in 2021.

Boys' Soccer won the 6A State Championship in the 2022–2023 season with an undefeated 21-0-1 record. Leaving the boys' soccer team as the only undefeated team in the state. Max May was also named Dairy Farmers Mr Soccer Player of the Year. Max is only the second player to receive this award in Brevard County.

The Boys' Golf Team won the 3A State Championship in the 2024.

== Fine Arts ==
Viera High School offers several fine arts programs including Band, Marching Band, Jazz Band, Orchestra, Chorus, Theatre, Dance, Colorguard, Art, and Drawing.

The VHS Marching Hawks & Band is one of the largest organizations on campus and have won several awards and honors since its establishment. Most recently the Band's Wind Ensemble traveled to Tampa & Memphis in 2024 to perform at the FMEA Concert Hour and the College Band Director's National Association/National Band Association Southern Division Conference.

The Viera High School Chorus is also highly coveted and performs annually at the Disney Candlelight Event. VHS Chorus also travelled to Carnegie Hall in 2025 to perform.

== Student Government ==
Viera High School offers Student Government as a class to students. Entrance to the class is application based. The Student Government Association(SGA) has won several awards and organizes events for the school including the Homecoming Dance and Blood Drives.

Viera High School Seniors additionally elect Senior Class Officers to represent them. The officers host events for senior year including Prom and Gradbash.

== Activities ==
The school offers students the following activities:

- Association of Latin American Students
- AP Literature Club
- Art Club
- Animation Club
- Arts & Crafts Club
- Asian Youth Leadership Association
- BETA Club(Invitation Based)
- Book Club
- Chess Club
- Child Hunger Project Club
- Technology Student Association
- Dental Club
- Disc Golf Club
- Exercise Science Club
- Environmental Club
- Fashion Club
- Fishing Club
- Fellowship of Christian Athletes
- First Priority
- Florida Future Educators of America
- French Club
- Hawk Buddies
- Hawk Robotics/Wingspan #7431
- Hawk Nation(Student Section)
- Investment Club
- Juggling Club
- Key Club International
- Kindness Club
- March of Dimes
- Mock Trial
- Model Student Senate
- Pickleball Club
- Pottery Club
- Puzzle Club
- Spanish Club
- Cow Club
- Team Mo
- Ping Pong Club

The school offers students the following Organizations and Extracurricular Classes:

- Band
- Marching Band
- Jazz Band
- Orchestra
- Chorus
- Theater/Troupe 7083
- Student Government Association(Application Based)
- National Honor Society(Invitation & Application Based)
- National English Honor Society(Application Based)
- National Science Honor Society(Application Based)
- Mu Alpha Theta(Application Based)
- Rho Kappa/Social Studies Honor Society(Application Based)
- Spanish Honor Society(Invitation Based)

== Notable alumni ==
- Tim DeMorat, football player
- Dylan Jordan, baseball player
- David McKay, baseball player
- Tre Nixon, football player
- Katie Stengel, soccer player
- Terry Davisićl, Phonk Regulator
