= Drury Plaza Hotel Orlando – Disney Springs Area =

Hotel at Walt Disney World

- Interactive map of the Drury Plaza Hotel Orlando – Disney Springs Area area
- Former names: Travelodge Lake Buena Vista; Viscount Hotel; Best Western Lake Buena Vista Resort Hotel
- Hotel chain: Drury Hotels

General information
- Location: Walt Disney World, 2000 Hotel Plaza Boulevard; Lake Buena Vista, Florida; United States
- Coordinates: 28.3783°N 81.5087°W
- Opened: November 21, 1972
- Owner: Drury Hotels

Other information
- Number of rooms: 526
- Number of suites: 78
- Facilities: 17,000 sq ft (1,600 m^{2}) of meeting space

Website
- druryplazahotelorlando.com

The Drury Plaza Hotel Orlando – Disney Springs Area is a resort hotel on the property of Walt Disney World Resort in Lake Buena Vista, Florida. The resort is located across from the Disney Springs area.

== History ==
The Travelodge at Lake Buena Vista opened on November 21, 1972. In 1984, Trusthouse Forte assumed management and the property was renamed the Viscount Hotel. In 1989, Travelodge resumed management and the hotel became the Travelodge Lake Buena Vista. In 2000, Best Western assumed management, and the property became the Best Western Lake Buena Vista Resort Hotel. The hotel was renovated in 2004 and has 2 outdoor pools. The hotel was purchased in August 2017 by Drury Hotels. In December 2019, Drury announced plans to remodel the property, adding a new wing, expanding the hotel from 325 to 604 rooms. The hotel closed in March 2020, due to the COVID-19 pandemic and ceased to be affiliated with Best Western. Construction of the new wing and renovations to the existing wing began in 2020. The hotel partially reopened in late 2022 as the Drury Plaza Hotel Orlando – Disney Springs Area, with the first 264 rooms opening. The remainder of the 604-room hotel opened in 2023.
