= Walt Disney World Hospitality and Recreation Corporation =

Walt Disney World Hospitality and Recreation Corporation, along with Walt Disney World Company, Walt Disney Travel Company, and Reedy Creek Improvement District, owns the land in Walt Disney World Resort. These are all wholly owned subsidiaries of The Walt Disney Company.

== History ==
Recreacres, Incorporated was incorporated in Delaware in or before 1968 to help buy up property for Walt Disney World Resort, most of which had already been bought by Compass East Corporation, now Walt Disney World Company.

On January 19, 1971, Recreacres, Incorporated changed its name to Buena Vista Land Company, Incorporated.

On September 6, 1973, Buena Vista Land Company, Incorporated changed its name to Buena Vista Communities, Incorporated.

On June 22, 1998, Buena Vista Communities, Incorporated changed its name to Walt Disney World Hospitality and Recreation Corporation.

Harvest Groves, Incorporated was merged into the Walt Disney World Hospitality and Recreation Corporation on September 30, 1999. This company was named Fischer and Howard, Corporation (which was organized July 1, 1976 to consolidate several small farms in the area) until June 22, 1993; the renaming probably happened soon after The Walt Disney Company took control of it.
