= Holiday Inn Orlando – Disney Springs Area =

Hotel at Walt Disney World

Coordinates: 28°22′30.28″N 81°30′29.67″W

Holiday Inn Orlando – Disney Springs Area is a resort hotel located on the property of Walt Disney World Resort in Lake Buena Vista, Florida. It is near the Disney Springs district on Hotel Plaza Boulevard. The resort has 323 rooms, a heated swimming pool and a hot tub. The hotel also has a view of the Disney Springs area and the rest of the Walt Disney World Resort from certain areas of the hotel.

== History ==
The hotel opened on February 8, 1973, as Howard Johnson's Motor Lodge, later the Howard Johnson at Walt Disney World Village. The hotel was expanded in 1978. It was bought by Marriott Hotels in 1994 and became the Courtyard by Marriott at Walt Disney World Village on January 20, 1995. InterContinental Hotels Group bought the resort in 2003 and it closed on December 30, 2003, for renovations to convert it to a Holiday Inn. The incomplete hotel was extensively damaged by Hurricane Charley on August 14, 2004. The hotel remained closed for six years, until it was restored and reopened on February 12, 2010, as the Holiday Inn Walt Disney World Resort, after a $35 million renovation. On December 9, 2016, the hotel was sold to Chicago-based GEM Realty Capital for $24 million. It is currently operated and managed by Interstate Hotels & Resorts, under the Holiday Inn brand.
