= Doug Lipp =

American writer (born 1955)

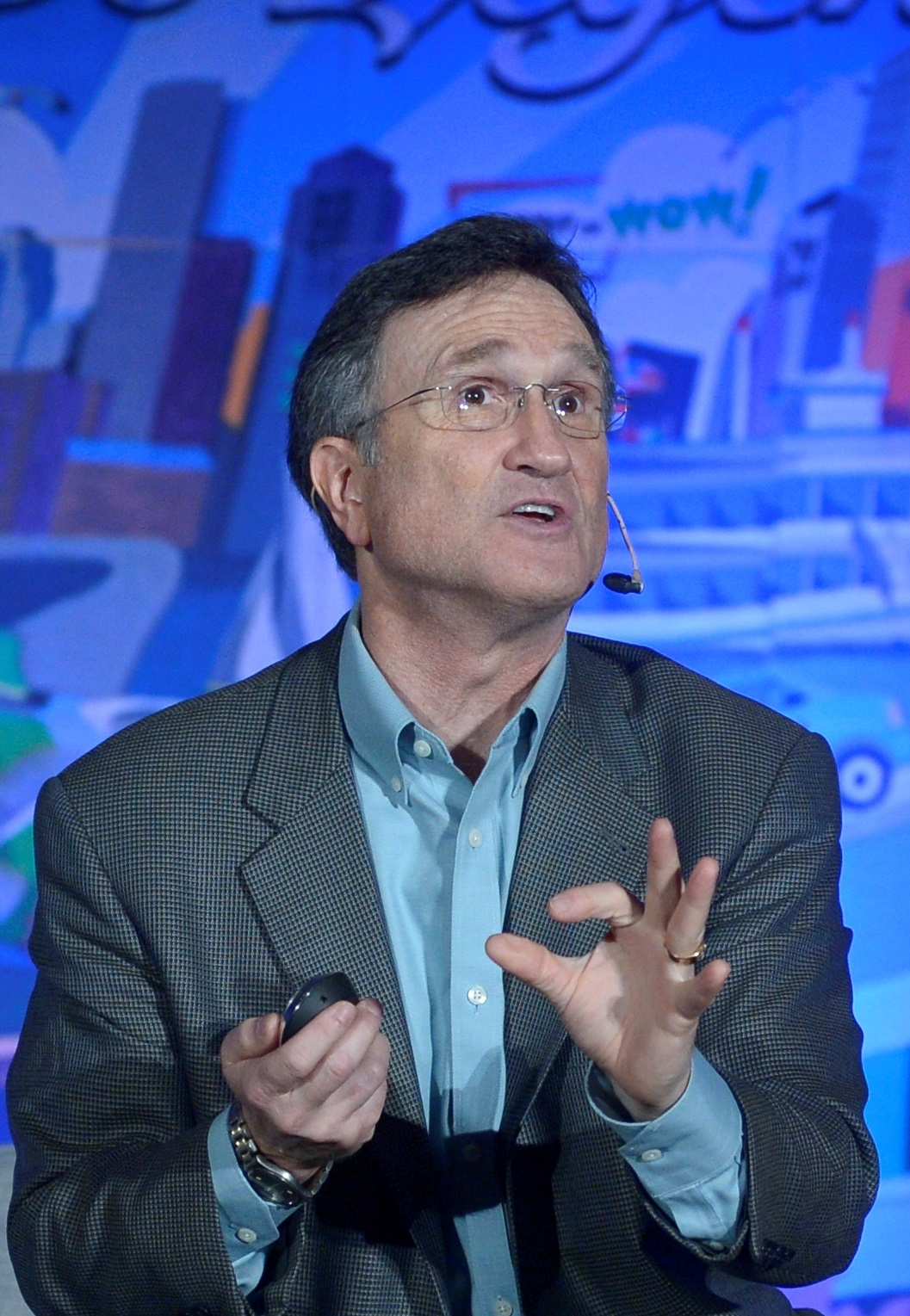
- Lipp speaking at a conference in 2012
- Born: 1955
- Education: California State University, Sacramento
- Occupations: Speaker, author, consultant
- Years active: 1981–present
- Website: douglipp.com

Gordon Douglas Lipp (born 1955) known as Doug Lipp is a consultant, speaker, and author based in Fair Oaks, California. Lipp is an expert in leadership and customer service. He is the CEO and President of G. Douglas Lipp & Associates, a consulting firm. Lipp previously served as head at the Disney University Corporate Headquarters training department and helped create the first international Disney University at Tokyo Disneyland. He has published books in English and Japanese and has given over 1500 keynote presentations.

== Education ==
Lipp earned a MA in International Business Communications from the California State University, Sacramento. He spent two years at the International Christian University in Mitaka, Tokyo, Japan and Nanzan University in Nagoya, Japan in post-graduate studies of Japanese language and history.

== Career ==
=== Early career ===
In 1978, Lipp began interning at Disney's marketing department in Anaheim, California. The company hired Lipp as an interpreter for Japanese officials planning the first international Disney theme park in Tokyo. At Disney University, Lipp created and presented numerous training programs for employees. Lipp was transferred to Japan, where he spent two years helping hire and train 4000 employees for Tokyo Disneyland. After repatriating from Tokyo Disneyland, Lipp was assigned to lead the Disney University training team at the Walt Disney Studios, Disney's corporate headquarters in Burbank, California. He developed leadership courses for studio employees and executives.

Doug Lipp left Disney to co-found the Intercultural Relations Institute (IRI), a global consulting business, with C. Clarke, a Stanford professor, in the mid-1980s. While working at IRI, Lipp consulted with corporations based in Europe, Asia, the Middle East and the United States. A few years later, he became a consultant for NEC, a Japan-based semiconductor company, when it expanded to Roseville, California. During this time, Lipp also worked with Sacramento Area Commerce and Trade Organization (SACTO), a local economic development group. He served as chair of the organization's Pacific Rim committee and helped recruit international companies to the Sacramento area. Lipp helped bring Kikkoman, Gekkeikan and Mitsubishi Rayon to the area.

=== Consulting and speaking ===
In 1993, he founded G. Douglas Lipp & Associates, a consultant firm that provides leadership, change management, customer service and global competitiveness services, after conducting a 30-day training program for The Pebble Beach Company. The firm provides corporate training programs and leadership projects for companies. Lipp conducted a series of seminars showcasing his experience with Disney from 1994 to 1995.

In June 2005, he conducted a customer-service training program for the Casino Reinvestment Development Authority in Jersey Shore. In March 2013, Lipp spoke to 21,000 McDonald's franchise owners and general managers in Las Vegas and 550 human-resource managers in Toronto for a week. That month, he published Disney U: How Disney University Develops the World's Most Engaged, Loyal, and Customer-Centric Employees. The book highlights leadership lessons from the founder and Dean of the Disney University, Van France. Disney U features 25 interviews with former Disney executives, stories about the corporation's early days, and 13 lessons from Disney University.

== Bibliography ==
- Negotiation Manual: How to Negotiate Overseas
- The Success of Tokyo Disneyland
- Global Management (2001) (ISBN 9784925080361)
- Danger and Opportunity (1998) (ISBN 9781877864599)
- Even Monkeys Fall From Trees (2001) (ISBN 9780970764805)
- The Changing Face of Today's Customer: Strategies for Attracting and Retaining a Diverse Customer and Employee Base In Your Local Market (2003 ) (ISBN 9780970764829)
- Stuck in the Middle Seat: Why Traveling Can Really Suck! (2008) (ISBN 9780970764836)
- Disney U: How Disney University Develops the World's Most Engaged, Loyal, and Customer-Centric Employees (2013) (ISBN 978-0071808071)
