= Walt Disney Travel Company =

Walt Disney Parks and Resorts company

Walt Disney Travel Company, Inc.
- Type: Subsidiary
- Industry: Travel
- Parent: Disney Parks, Experiences and Products (The Walt Disney Company)
- Divisions: Disney Institute; Disney Event Group
- Website: disneyvacations.com

The Walt Disney Travel Company is the company name for the services The Walt Disney Company employ to help guests book tickets and reservations for the Walt Disney Parks and Resorts around the world. Travel agencies currently book their vacation packages through the Walt Disney Travel Company.

== History ==
=== Landholding company ===
The Walt Disney Travel Company, Incorporated, along with the Walt Disney World Company, the Walt Disney World Hospitality and Recreation Corporation and the Reedy Creek Improvement District, owns the land in the Walt Disney World Resort. These are all wholly owned subsidiaries of The Walt Disney Company.

Santa Rosa Land Company, Incorporated, incorporated in or before 1968 to own some of the Walt Disney World Resort, changed its name to Walt Disney Travel Company, Incorporated on August 16, 1973. All of the land it owns is backstage areas (i.e., areas not normally open to the public).

=== Travel sales ===
In April 2014, president Randy Garfield retired. Kenneth Svendsen was named president in March 2014.

== Services ==
The Walt Disney Travel Company has three main offices, where guests can call-in to get help booking their accommodations, tickets, airfare, and other travel products.

=== Disneyland Resort Travel Sales Center ===
The DRTSC is located in Anaheim, California, about a mile from the Disneyland Resort. This location helps guests book tickets for Disneyland and Disney California Adventure. It also books for Disney's Grand Californian Hotel & Spa, Disneyland Hotel, Pixar Place Hotel, and a large group of hotels throughout Southern California, including in Los Angeles and San Diego.

The DRTSC also provides overflow support for Disney World Reservations and MyDisneyExperience technical support.

It also does travel services for Aulani.

=== Disney Reservation Center ===
The Disney Reservation Center is located in Orlando, Florida, with a second office in Tampa, Florida. This location services Walt Disney World, and all included Theme Parks, Resort Hotels, partner hotels, ticket sales, as well as technical support and photo support and recovery for the MyDisneyExperience website and app.

The Disney Reservation Center also provides support for the Disneyland Resort in California and Aulani Resort & Spa through Internet Help Desk, Photo Imaging Guest Support, and serves as the reservation center for Disneyland Paris in France.

=== Walt Disney Travel Company International ===
Walt Disney Travel Company International (WDTCI) is a division of The Walt Disney Company Ltd, and Disney's official holiday specialist for the EMEA market, bringing guests great deals on Disney hotels, tickets and transport-inclusive holidays to Walt Disney World, Disneyland Paris and Disney Cruise Line.

== See also ==
- Reedy Creek Improvement District
- Walt Disney World Company
- Walt Disney World Hospitality and Recreation Corporation
- Walt Disney World Resort
- Adventures by Disney
