= H. J. High Construction =

American construction company

- Type: Private
- Industry: Construction
- Founded: 1936
- Headquarters: Orlando, Florida
- Key people: Robert J. High, President; Steven W. High, Chairman; Bart Sontag, Vice President
- Services: General contracting, pre-construction services, design-build, construction management, preventative maintenance
- Number of employees: 23
- Website: www.hjhigh.com

H. J. High Construction is a construction company headquartered in Orlando, Florida and licensed in Florida, Georgia and South Carolina.

== History ==
The company was founded in 1936 in Orlando, Florida by Harlem John High, a New York City brick mason who relocated to Orlando in 1935. Harlem John High ran the company until his death in 1968. He was succeeded by his son Steven, who served as the company's president from 1968 to 2005. Steven W. High received a Bachelor of Science degree from Stetson University, an MBA from Rollins College, and completed Harvard University’s Owner/President Management School program. He is DBIA-certified and a Certified General Contractor.

In 2006, Steven High became the company's Chairman, with his son Robert John High assuming the President's position. Robert J. High earned a Bachelor of Arts degree from Furman University, an MBA from Rollins College, and completed Harvard University's Owner/President Management School program. He is LEED accredited, DBIA-certified, and a Certified General Contractor.

In 1961, H. J. High received an Award of Merit from the U.S. Army Corps of Engineers for its work in helping Cape Kennedy prepare for the Apollo Moon landing program.

== Operations ==
H. J. High Construction provides general contracting, pre-construction services, design-build, construction management, and preventative maintenance services for education, religious, industrial, and commercial facilities.

Industries segments include:

- Commercial
- Construction Management
- Distribution
- Education
- Food & Beverage
- Green Building
- Manufacturing
- Public-Private Partnerships

H. J. High clients include Walt Disney World, Lockheed Martin, Mitsubishi Power Systems America, Orange County (FL) Convention Center, First Baptist Church of Orlando, Indian River State College, and National Distribution Centers. The company has completed nearly 1,000 projects ranging from $100,000 to $100 million and has never been involved in litigation.

== Community involvement ==
H. J. High donates volunteer time to community organizations and local nonprofits. Current and past recipients include:

- Camp Boggy Creek
- Center for Independent Living
- Coalition for the Homeless of Central Florida
- Florida United Methodist Children's Home
- Grace Medical Home
- Habitat for Humanity
- Hailey's Hopes & Hugs Foundation
- Pet Rescue by Judy
- Quest, Inc./Camp Thunderbird
- Susan G. Komen Race for the Cure
- The Nature Conservancy's Oyster Reef Restoration Program
- The Russell Home for Atypical Children in South Orlando
- The Sunshine Foundation
