= Disney's Magical Express =

Defunct shuttle transportation service

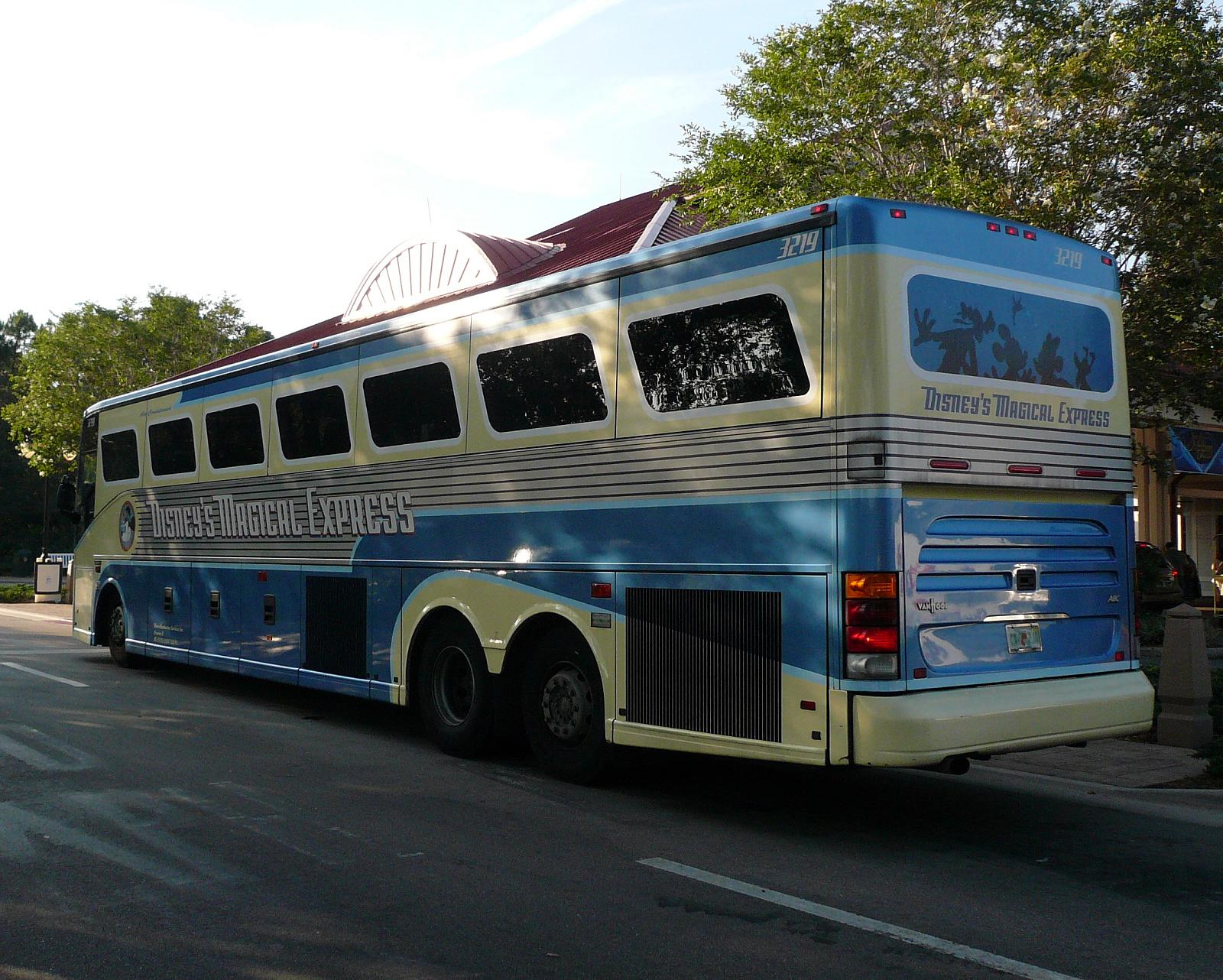
- A Magical Express bus parked outside a Walt Disney World resort hotel
- Parent: The Walt Disney Company
- Founded: 2005; 21 years ago
- Defunct: January 1, 2022; 4 years ago
- Locale: Florida, United States
- Service area: Bay Lake; Port Canaveral
- Service type: Coach
- Destinations: Walt Disney World Resort; Orlando International Airport; Disney Cruise Line Terminal
- Hubs: Walt Disney World Resort
- Stations: 23
- Fleet: Van Hool buses
- Daily ridership: 6,000 (2009)
- Annual ridership: 2.3 million (2013)
- Operator: Mears (buses); Bags, Inc. (baggage)
- Website: Official website

Disney's Magical Express was a private ground transportation and luggage delivery service for the Walt Disney World Resort in Orlando, Florida and the Disney Cruise Line Terminal at Port Canaveral, operated by Mears Transportation. The complimentary service was only available to guests with hotel reservations at the Walt Disney World Resort as well as those with departures with Disney Cruise Line.

== History ==
Disney's Magical Express commenced operations in 2005. The service initially faced strong opposition from the Greater Orlando Livery Association and Orlando-area ground transportation companies, and taxi cab operators, arguing that it allows Disney to "whisk away" potential customers who would otherwise have continued on to a taxi cab or private transportation service for transportation to their hotel. This keeps them from leaving Disney property during their trip to spend money elsewhere, since they do not need a rental car or other transportation to get to their resort.

Despite the initial opposition, the service became extremely popular, carrying 2.2 to 2.3 million guests between 2009 and 2013. In 2010, Allegiant Air announced that they would be moving ten of their flights from Orlando Sanford to Orlando International Airport, based partially on the fact that Disney's Magical Express service only goes to Orlando International, though the airline later moved back to Sanford, citing higher costs. In 2015, Universal Orlando, Disney's main competitor in the area, announced their own airport shuttle to their own resort, Universal's SuperStar Shuttle. It was initially operated by Escot Bus Lines, until Mears Transportation took over as of April 1, 2021.

In November 2021, Brightline announced an extension of their higher-speed rail line from the Orlando International Airport Intermodal Terminal to Disney Springs, which raised concerns over the future of Disney's Magical Express. In January 2021, The Walt Disney Company announced the discontinuation of Disney's Magical Express, which was made effective January 1, 2022, citing changes to consumer preferences as the reason; the announcement was subject to controversy. Transportation from the resorts to the airport continued until January 10, 2022.

== Service ==
Disney's Magical Express service ran exclusively from Orlando International Airport, available to guests with reservations at a Walt Disney World resort hotel. For return service to the airport, guests were typically scheduled for a motor coach departure from their Disney resort hotel to Orlando International Airport no less than three hours prior to their flight's scheduled departure time for domestic flights; four hours for international flights. Disney's Magical Express also transported guests from Orlando International Airport or their Disney Resort hotel to Port Canaveral for Disney Cruise Line departures and back.

Bags, Inc. handled the collection and transportation of guest luggage from the airport directly to the guest's resort hotel until July 2020 with no need for guests to go to baggage claim. After the service was discontinued, guests were required to pick up their baggage and check in with the transportation.
