= Walt Disney World =

Entertainment resort in Florida

Walt Disney World Resort

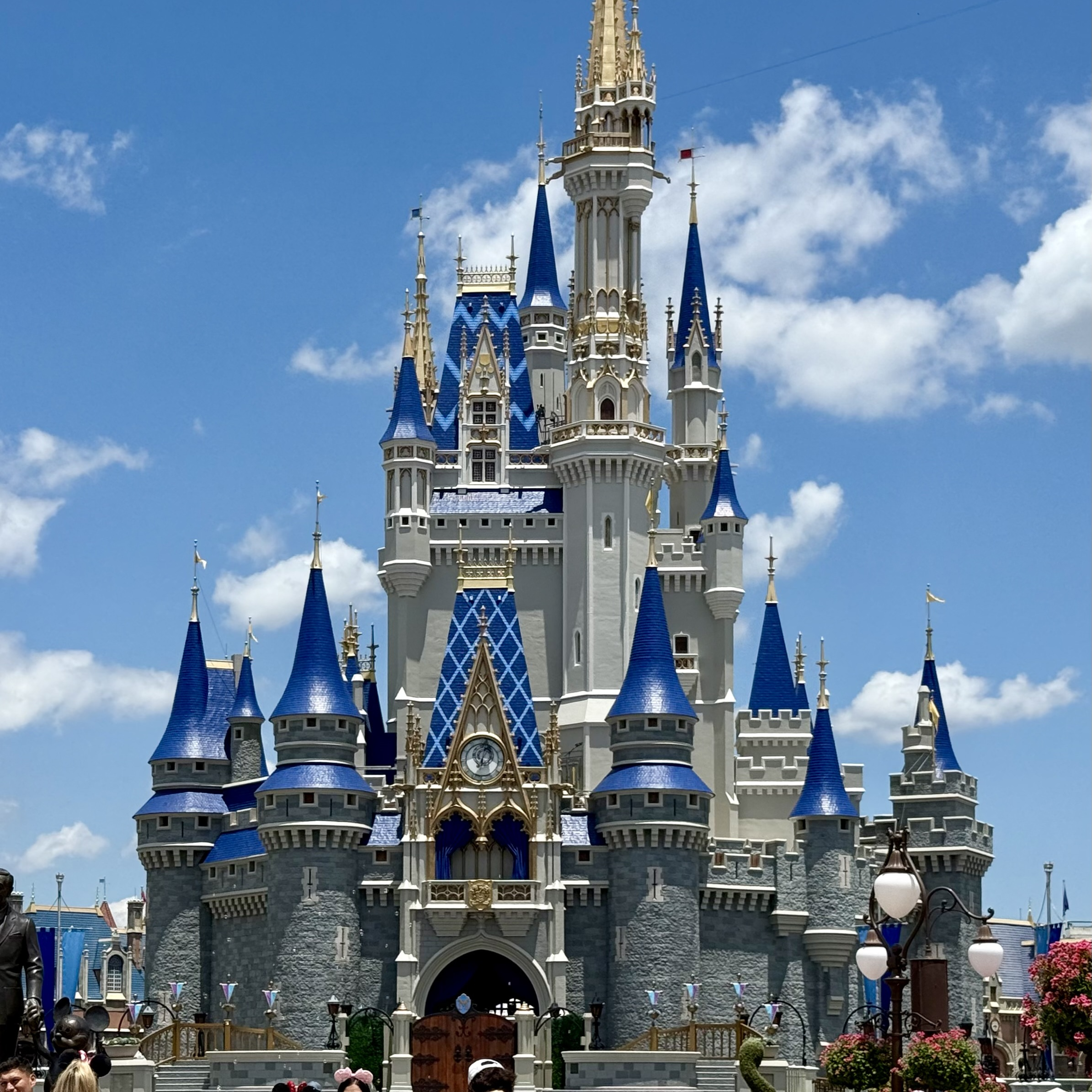
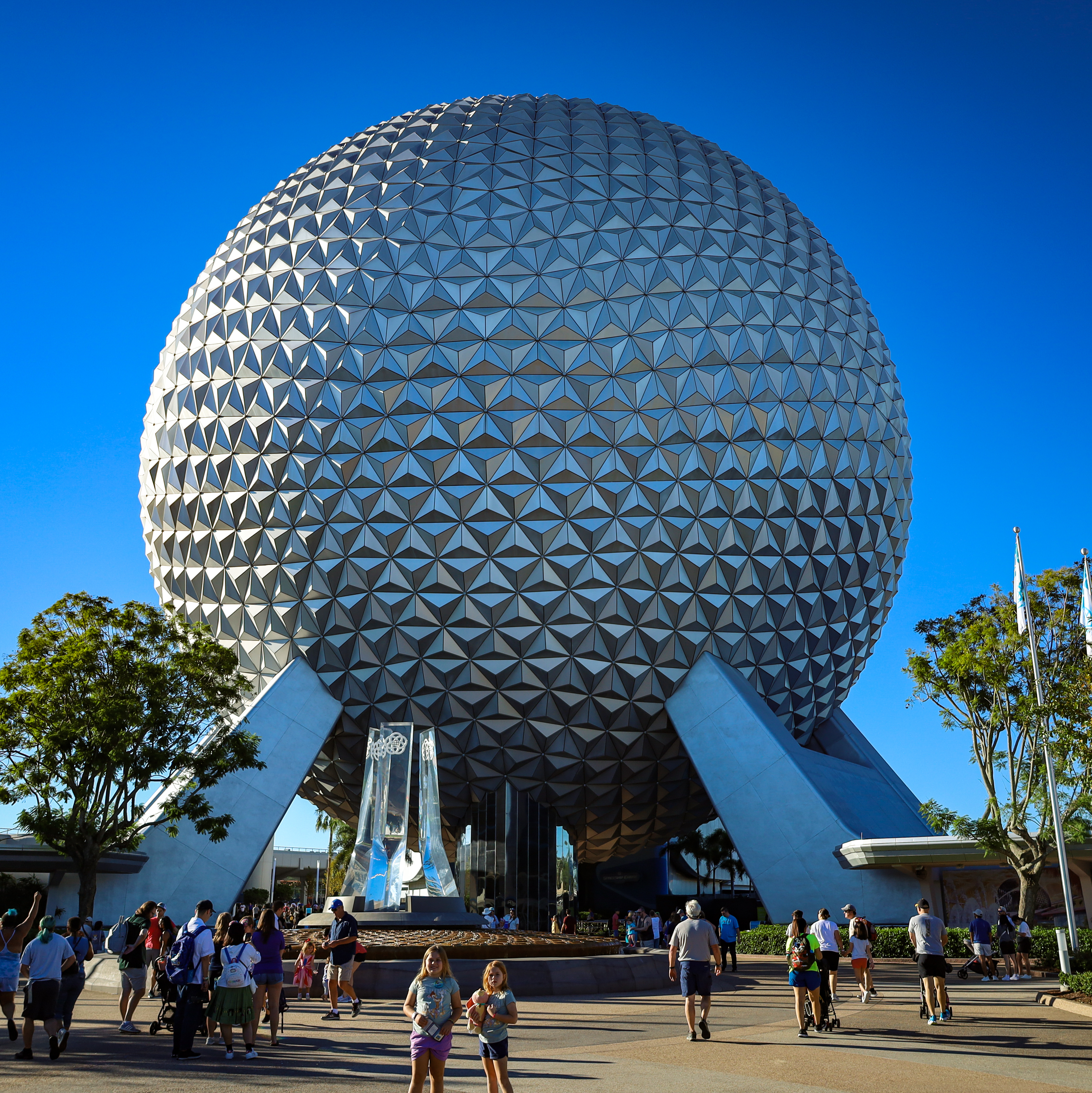
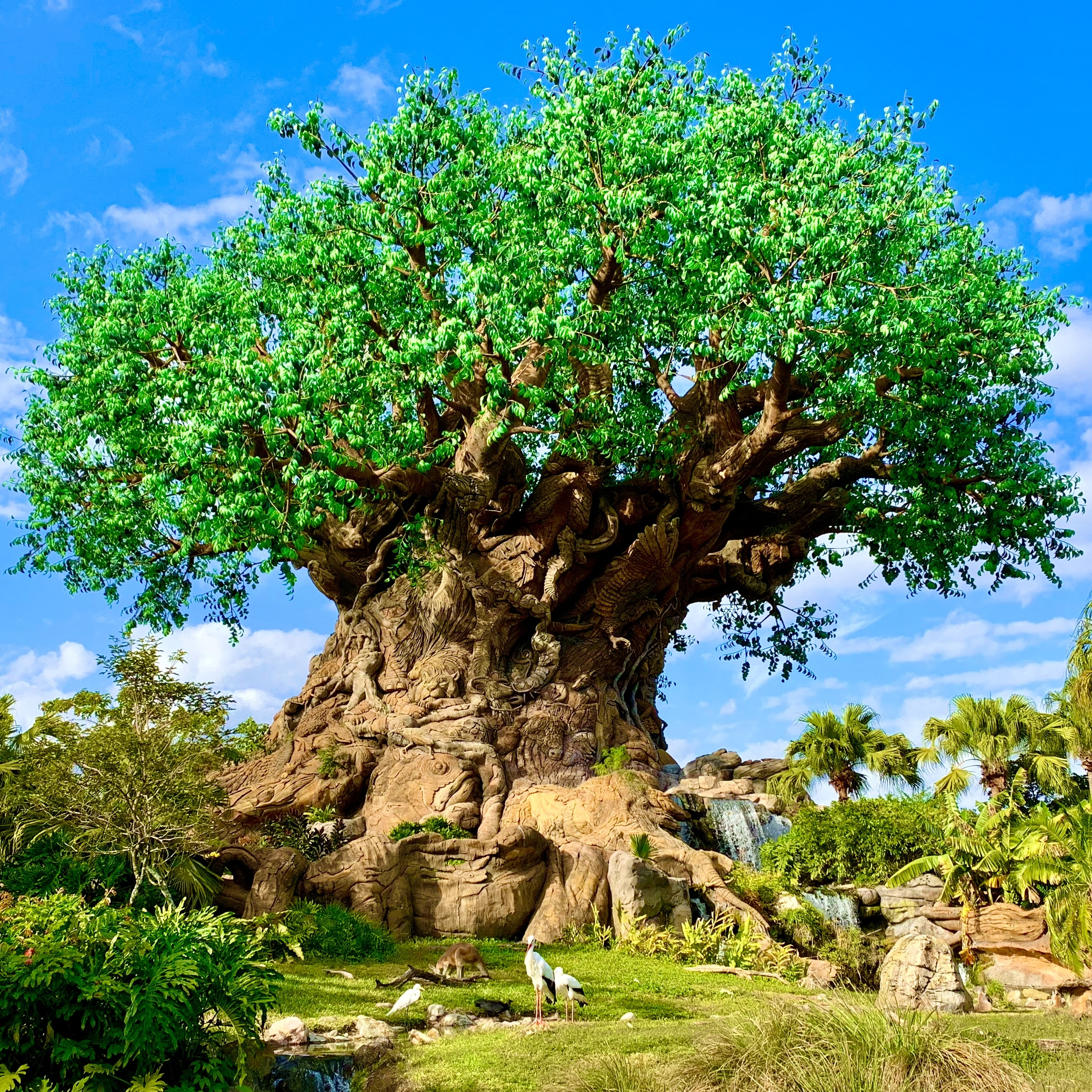
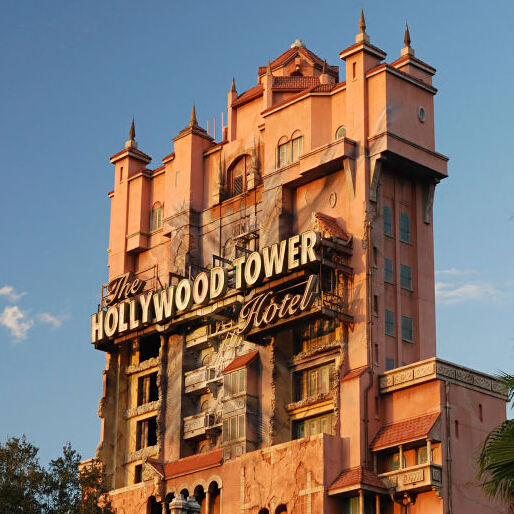
- Four icons of Walt Disney World, clockwise from top left: Cinderella Castle at Magic Kingdom, Spaceship Earth at Epcot, Hollywood Tower Hotel at Hollywood Studios, and Tree of Life at Animal Kingdom
- Industry: Entertainment, hospitality
- Founded: October 1, 1971 (55 years ago)
- Founders: Walt Disney; Roy O. Disney
- Headquarters: 1375 East Buena Vista Drive, Lake Buena Vista, Florida, U.S.
- Key people: Joe Schott (president); Jason Kirk (SVP, Theme Parks); Maribeth Bisienere (SVP, Resorts)
- Number of employees: 80,000+
- Parent: Disney Experiences
- Website: disneyworld.com

Walt Disney World Resort (commonly known as Walt Disney World or Disney World) is an entertainment and vacation resort complex located about 20 miles (32 km) southwest of Orlando, Florida, United States. Opened on October 1, 1971, the resort is operated by Disney Experiences, a division of the Walt Disney Company.

Covering an approximate 27,000 acres (42 sq mi; 109 km^{2}), Walt Disney World contains numerous recreational facilities designed to attract visitors for extended stays, including four theme parks, two water parks, four golf courses, conference centers, a competitive sports complex and a major shopping, dining and entertainment complex. Additionally, there are 31 Disney-owned resort hotels and one camping resort on the property, and many other non-Disney-operated hotels on and near the property.

Designed to supplement Disneyland in Anaheim, California, which had opened in 1955, the complex was planned and conceptualized by Walt Disney in the 1960s. Walt's vision for the complex was to build a new, self-contained destination resort on ample land, as he felt Disneyland had become limited by the third-party establishments that had sprung up around it. "The Florida Project", as it was then known, was intended to present a distinct vision with its own diverse set of attractions. Walt's original plans called for the inclusion of an "Experimental Prototype Community of Tomorrow" (EPCOT), a planned community intended to serve as a testbed for new city-living innovations. Walt's original vision would not progress past conceptualization, as he died on December 15, 1966, during the initial planning of the complex before construction had begun. After his death, the company wrestled with the idea of whether to bring the Disney World project to fruition; however, Walt's older brother, Roy O. Disney, came out of retirement to ensure the project was realized.

Construction began in 1967, with the company abandoning the planned community concept, instead choosing to build a theme park resort similar to Disneyland. Magic Kingdom was the first theme park to open in the complex in 1971, followed by EPCOT (then known as EPCOT Center) in 1982, Disney's Hollywood Studios (then known as the Disney-MGM Studios Theme Park) in 1989, and Disney's Animal Kingdom in 1998. Initially known as Disney World, the name of the entire resort was named Walt Disney World at Roy's insistence, to memorialize his brother.

In 2024, Walt Disney World was the most visited vacation resort in the world, with an average annual attendance of more than 49 million, while Magic Kingdom has been the most visited theme park in the world for at least the past 24 years. The opening of Walt Disney World helped turn Central Florida into a major global tourism destination and the resort has contributed significantly to Florida's economy, generating billions in economic activity and supporting a large number of jobs across the state. The resort is the largest single-site employer in the United States, the flagship destination of Disney's worldwide corporate enterprise and has become a staple of American popular culture.

== History ==
=== Planning and construction ===
==== Conception ====
Overlay of Walt Disney's original 1966 plans for Disney World and the proposed EPCOT city (orange) and contemporary situation (blue)

In 1959, Walt Disney Productions began looking for land to house a second resort to supplement Disneyland in Anaheim, California, which had opened in 1955. Market surveys at the time revealed that only 5% of Disneyland's visitors came from east of the Mississippi River, where 75% of the population of the United States lived. Additionally, Walt Disney disliked the businesses that had sprung up around Disneyland and thus wanted more control over a larger area of land in his next project.

After rejecting the idea of an indoor theme park in St. Louis, Missouri, Walt Disney took a flight over a potential site in Orlando, Florida—one of many—in November 1963. Taking into account the well-developed network of roads as well as the planned construction of both Interstate 4 and Florida's Turnpike, along with McCoy Air Force Base (later Orlando International Airport) to the east, Disney selected a centrally located site near Bay Lake. This development was referred to internally as "The Florida Project". Early planning documents also suggest that the project was expected to have a strong economic impact on Florida even before construction began.

To avoid a burst of land speculation, Walt Disney Productions used various dummy corporations to acquire 27,443 acres (43 sq mi; 111 km^{2}) of land, beginning in April 1964. These dummy corporations were originally given tongue-in-cheek names such as the "Ayefour Corporation", "Latin-American Development and Management Corporation", and the "Reedy Creek Ranch Corporation," before eventually being merged by Disney into the Compass East Corporation in 1966. Some of these original dummy names are now memorialized on windows above Main Street, U.S.A. in the Magic Kingdom.

Working strictly in secrecy, real estate agents (unaware of their client's identity) began making offers to landowners in parts of southwest Orange and northwest Osceola counties, being careful not to reveal the extent of their intentions. They were able to negotiate numerous land contracts with some landowners, including large tracts of land for as little as $100 an acre; at the time, most landowners were happy to get rid of their land, which was mostly swamp. Additionally, Disney's team negotiated a deal with Tufts University to buy the mineral rights to the land for $15,000. With the understanding that the recording of the first deeds would trigger intense public scrutiny, Disney delayed the filing of paperwork until a large portion of the land was under contract.

After the first deeds were recorded, early rumors and speculation about the land purchases assumed possible development by NASA in support of the nearby Kennedy Space Center, as well as references to other famous investors, such as Ford, the Rockefellers, and Howard Hughes. Eventually, an Orlando Sentinel news article published on May 20, 1965 acknowledged a popular rumor that Disney was building an "East Coast" version of Disneyland. However, the publication denied its accuracy based on an earlier interview with Disney at Kennedy Space Center. In that interview, he claimed a $50 million investment was in the works for Disneyland, and that he had no interest in building a new park.

Archival footage of Walt Disney, his brother Roy, and then Governor of Florida W. Haydon Burns publicly announcing the creation of Disney World on November 15, 1965.

In October 1965, editor Emily Bavar from the Sentinel visited Disneyland during the park's 10th-anniversary celebration. In an interview with Disney, she asked him if he was behind recent land purchases in Central Florida. Bavar later described that Disney "looked like I had thrown a bucket of water in his face", before denying the story. His reaction, combined with other research obtained during her Anaheim visit, led Bavar to write a story on October 21, 1965, where she predicted that Disney was building a second theme park in Florida. Three days later, after gathering more information from various sources, the Sentinel published another article headlined, "We Say: 'Mystery' Industry Is Disney".

Walt Disney had originally planned to publicly reveal Disney World on November 15, 1965, but in light of the Sentinel story, Disney asked Florida Governor Haydon Burns to confirm the story on October 25; Burns did so, calling Disney's project "the greatest attraction in the history of Florida". The official reveal was kept on the previously planned November 15 date, which Disney joined Burns in Orlando for. At the reveal, Disney announced the project in a matter so as to not reveal any specific information, though he did note that the plan was to "top what we [Disney] have, or at least be equivalent to what we have now, in California."

==== Roy Disney's oversight of construction ====
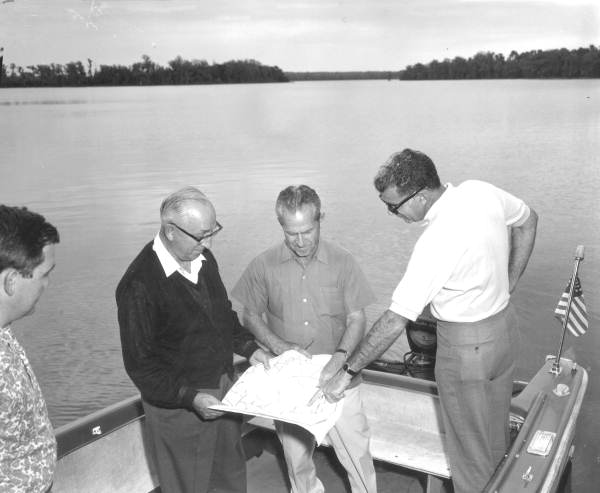
Roy O. Disney inspecting design plans on-site in Florida c. 1963–1964

Walt Disney died from circulatory collapse caused by smoking-related lung cancer on December 15, 1966, before his vision was realized. According to the Walt Disney Archives, during Disney's lifetime, he personally visited and toured the site only twice: on November 16, 1965, the day after the press conference, and again for a second time, on May 26, 1966. His brother and business partner, Roy O. Disney, postponed his retirement to oversee construction of the resort's first phase.

On February 2, 1967, Roy O. Disney held a press conference at the Park Theatres in Winter Park, Florida. The role of EPCOT was emphasized in the film that was played. After the film, it was explained that for Disney World, including EPCOT, to succeed, a special district would have to be formed: the Reedy Creek Improvement District with two cities inside it, Bay Lake and Reedy Creek, now Lake Buena Vista. In addition to the standard powers of an incorporated city, which include issuance of tax-free bonds, the district would have immunity from any current or future county or state land-use laws. The only areas where the district had to submit to the county and state would be property taxes and elevator inspections. The legislation forming the district and the two cities, one of which was the Reedy Creek Improvement Act, was signed into law by Florida Governor Claude R. Kirk, Jr. on May 12, 1967. The Supreme Court of Florida then ruled in 1968 that the district was allowed to issue tax-exempt bonds for public projects within the district, despite the sole beneficiary being Walt Disney Productions. The district soon began construction of drainage canals, and Disney built the first roads and the Magic Kingdom.

=== 1971–1982: Opening and early expansion ===
The original logo of Walt Disney World from 1971 to the mid-1990s. This logo is still used on retro merchandise.

The Magic Kingdom, Polynesian Village Resort, and Contemporary Resort Hotel opened on October 1, 1971 to a moderate crowd of approximately 10,000 guests; Disney officials wanted to avoid the overcrowding issues largely associated with Disneyland's opening. The Magic Kingdom largely followed the same layout and design as Disneyland with many duplicate attractions, though the Walt Disney Company promised to increase the number of unique attractions and attractions overall. The two hotels were constructed using United States Steel's then newly developed construction processes for A-frame longhouses.

A more elaborate grand opening ceremony was held between October 23 and 25. At the ceremony, Roy O. Disney dedicated the property and declared that it would be known as "Walt Disney World", in his brother's honor. In his own words: "Everyone has heard of Ford cars. But have they all heard of Henry Ford, who started it all? Walt Disney World is in memory of the man who started it all, so people will know his name as long as Walt Disney World is here." After the dedication, Roy Disney asked Walt's widow, Lillian, what she thought of Walt Disney World. According to biographer Bob Thomas, she responded, "I think Walt would have approved." The Fort Wilderness Campground opened a month later; it would be the last Disney-owned lodging accommodation to open until 1988.

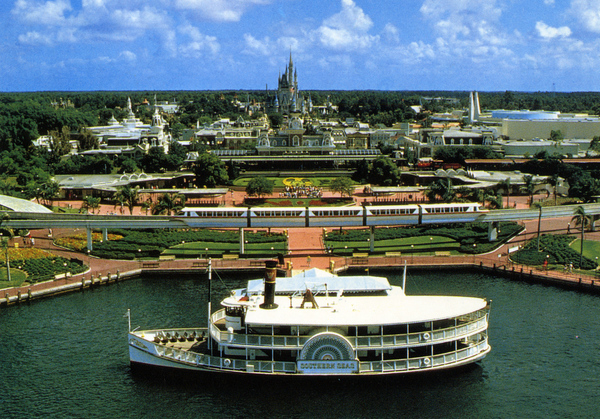
An aerial shot of the Magic Kingdom from the Seven Seas Lagoon in 1982

Two smaller parks in addition to the Magic Kingdom—Discovery Island and Disney's River Country—opened on April 8, 1974 and on June 20, 1976, respectively. Discovery Island functioned as a zoological park and Disney's River Country as a water park. Discovery Island closed on april 8, 1999 and Disney's River Country on November 2, 2001; though no official reasons were given for either closure, the opening of similar on-property theme parks by Disney (see 1982–2013: Mass expansion) are assumed to have contributed. The Lake Buena Vista Shopping Village also opened in 1975; the area is known today as Disney Springs.

The Walt Disney Company's next big project became the construction of the resort's second theme park, EPCOT Center (renamed Epcot in 1996). Though the company had little interest in Walt Disney's original concept of operating a "city of tomorrow," EPCOT Center still incorporated the themes of human achievement, technological advancement, and international culture as part of its themes. Groundbreaking for EPCOT Center happened on October 1, 1979, and the park opened three years later on October 1, 1982. Its construction cost $1.5 billion (equivalent to approximately $5 billion today), with Disney paying around 80% at $1.2 billion while corporate sponsors contributed the rest. Though the opening of EPCOT Center did substantially increase the amount of visitors to the resort, the high costs of its construction made some feel it only contributed further to the company's troubling financial state in the mid-1980s.

=== 1982–2013: Mass expansion ===
Under the leadership of CEO Michael Eisner, the Walt Disney Company embarked on the "Disney Decade" through the late 1980s and early 1990s. This involved large-scale investments in the company's theme parks and resorts, as well as in the company's media and film divisions. At Walt Disney World specifically, this meant creating more entertainment such that guests stay on Disney property for longer periods of time. The resort's third theme park, Disney-MGM Studios (renamed Disney's Hollywood Studios in 2008), opened on May 1, 1989, inspired by show business with the intent of becoming the "Hollywood of the East". The opening of Disney-MGM Studios was not met without controversy—Entertainment company MCA (now known as Universal Pictures) filed a lawsuit against the Walt Disney Company, alleging that Eisner, as former CEO of Paramount Pictures, stole MCA's plans for a theme park centered around a studio backlot tour, a claim that Eisner vehemently denied. MCA would go on to open their own theme park a month later.

The 1996 version of The Walt Disney World logo

Though the Disney Decade was never fully realized because of the financial disappointment of Euro Disney, Walt Disney World still experienced massive expansion with the opening of nine new resort hotels, a hotel and entertainment complex at Disney's BoardWalk, and two themed water parks (Disney's Typhoon Lagoon on June 1, 1989 and Disney's Blizzard Beach on April 1, 1995) that effectively replaced Disney's River Country (which closed November 2, 2001). The Disney Decade culminated with the opening of Disney's Animal Kingdom on April 22, 1998, the resort's fourth and largest theme park, measuring at 580 acres (230 ha) on opening day. However, because of Euro Disney-related financial constraints, the park never was constructed to its full original concept, with the planned Beastly Kingdom section never being constructed.

During the resort's mass expansion, there was considerable environmentalist push-back and the resort was convinced to engage in mitigation banking. In an agreement with The Nature Conservancy and the state of Florida, Disney purchased 8,500 acres (3,400 ha) of land, adjacent to the park for the purpose of rehabilitating wetland ecosystems. The Disney Wilderness Preserve was established in April 1993, and the land was subsequently transferred to The Nature Conservancy. The Walt Disney Company provided additional funds for landscape restoration and wildlife monitoring.

Walt Disney World introduced FastPass, a free virtual queue system, in 1999. Park guests would scan their park ticket at an automated machine outside of a participating theme park attraction, and receive a half-hour one-hour return time window for that attraction. Additionally, to encourage visitors to stay on Disney property for the entirety of their vacations, the resort introduced Disney's Magical Express in 2005, a free shuttle bus and luggage-handling service between Orlando International Airport and the various resort hotels at Walt Disney World.

Following the September 11 attacks, Walt Disney World was designated as a Temporary Flight Restrictions space, restricting the airspace above the property. Two years later, it was designated as permanent prohibited airspace zone that restricts all airspace activities, including the usage of drones, without approval from the Federal Aviation Administration.

=== 2013–present: Current advancements ===
The 2018 version of The Walt Disney World logo.

The Walt Disney World resort introduced MyMagic+, Disney's branding for its consumer suite of technologies, to the general public on January 7, 2013. As part of MyMagic+, FastPass was reintroduced as FastPass+, wherein guests could "book" attractions up to 60 days prior to their arrival at Walt Disney World. Additionally, the resort introduced My Disney Experience and Disney PhotoPass, a streamlined mobile app and professional photography service, respectively. All these services were to be accessed by guests using MagicBands, a wearable RFID technology which prior to 2021 was provided for free to all on-site resort guests before their arrival at the resort. The MyMagic+ initiative cost the Walt Disney World company $1 billion to develop.

On March 12, 2020, a Disney spokesperson announced that Walt Disney World and Disneyland Paris would temporarily close due to the COVID-19 pandemic, beginning March 15, 2020. In June 2020, Walt Disney World was chosen to host the NBA Bubble for play of the 2019–20 season of the National Basketball Association (NBA) to resume at the ESPN Wide World of Sports Complex. On July 11, 2020, Walt Disney World officially reopened to the general public, beginning operations at 25% capacity at the Magic Kingdom and Disney's Animal Kingdom. Four days later, EPCOT and Disney's Hollywood Studios opened for operation, also at 25% capacity. Masks were required at all times (including outdoors, on attractions, and while taking photos), all guests were required to have their temperature taken upon entry, plexiglass was installed on various attractions and transportation offerings, shows that drew large crowds such as parades and nighttime shows (including Fantasmic! and Happily Ever After) were suspended, and guest services such as FastPass+ and the Disney Dining Plan were not offered. As part of the phased reopening process, the resort laid off 6,500 employees.

In November 2020, the resort increased the guest capacity to 35% at all four theme parks, and on May 13, 2021, Chapek announced a further increase of capacity, effective immediately; however, he did not say to what capacity level it would be raised. By mid-June 2021, temperature checks and mask mandates (except while on Disney transportation) had been lifted. In late July 2021, mask mandates were reinstated for all attractions and indoor areas in light of new guidance issued by the Centers for Disease Control as the delta variant drove a significant increase in local COVID-19 cases; these reinstated mandates were lifted in February 2022. In April 2022, following a court decision ending the federal mask mandate for public transportation, the mask mandates for Disney Transport were lifted.

Starting on October 1, 2021, the resort honored its 50th anniversary with "The World's Most Magical Celebration", which lasted for 18 consecutive months ending on March 31, 2023. The celebration involved the opening of new attractions across the resort, the temporary replacement of Happily Ever After with Disney Enchantment, and special limited-time merchandise.

Disney's Magical Express service ended in January 2022, though free luggage-handling service for departing guests to Orlando International Airport was reintroduced in 2024 as Airport Luggage Transfer for guests of select hotels using American Airlines, United Airlines, and Southwest Airlines. Also, in August 2021, the free FastPass+ virtual queue service was replaced with Genie+, starting at $15 per day. Among other things, Genie+ allowed you to select attractions for which to use a "Lightning Lane,” similar to FastPass+; the pricing range depended on the crowd and day of purchase. Genie+ was replaced with Lightning Lane Multi Pass and Lightning Lane Single Pass in July 2024.

The self-governing status which the Walt Disney Company had in the area around Disney World for more than 50 years came to an end on April 22, 2022, after Florida Governor Ron DeSantis signed into law legislation requiring the area to come under the legal jurisdiction of the state of Florida. The new law also officially abolished the Reedy Creek Improvement District, which the Walt Disney Company has used to effectively govern the resort since May 1967, when then-Florida Governor Claude Kirk signed into law legislation which granted the company special status. The new law went into effect in June 2023, with the formation of the new Central Florida Tourism Oversight District. To avoid unwanted regulation from the Florida state government, the Walt Disney Company signed an agreement with the Reedy Creek Improvement District just before state takeover that grants the Walt Disney Company full control over construction and development within the Walt Disney World Resort de facto indefinitely, by using a royal lives clause in the written contract.

== Location ==
Interactive map of Walt Disney World. Epcot in magenta, Magic Kingdom in purple, Hollywood Studios in red and Animal Kingdom in green.

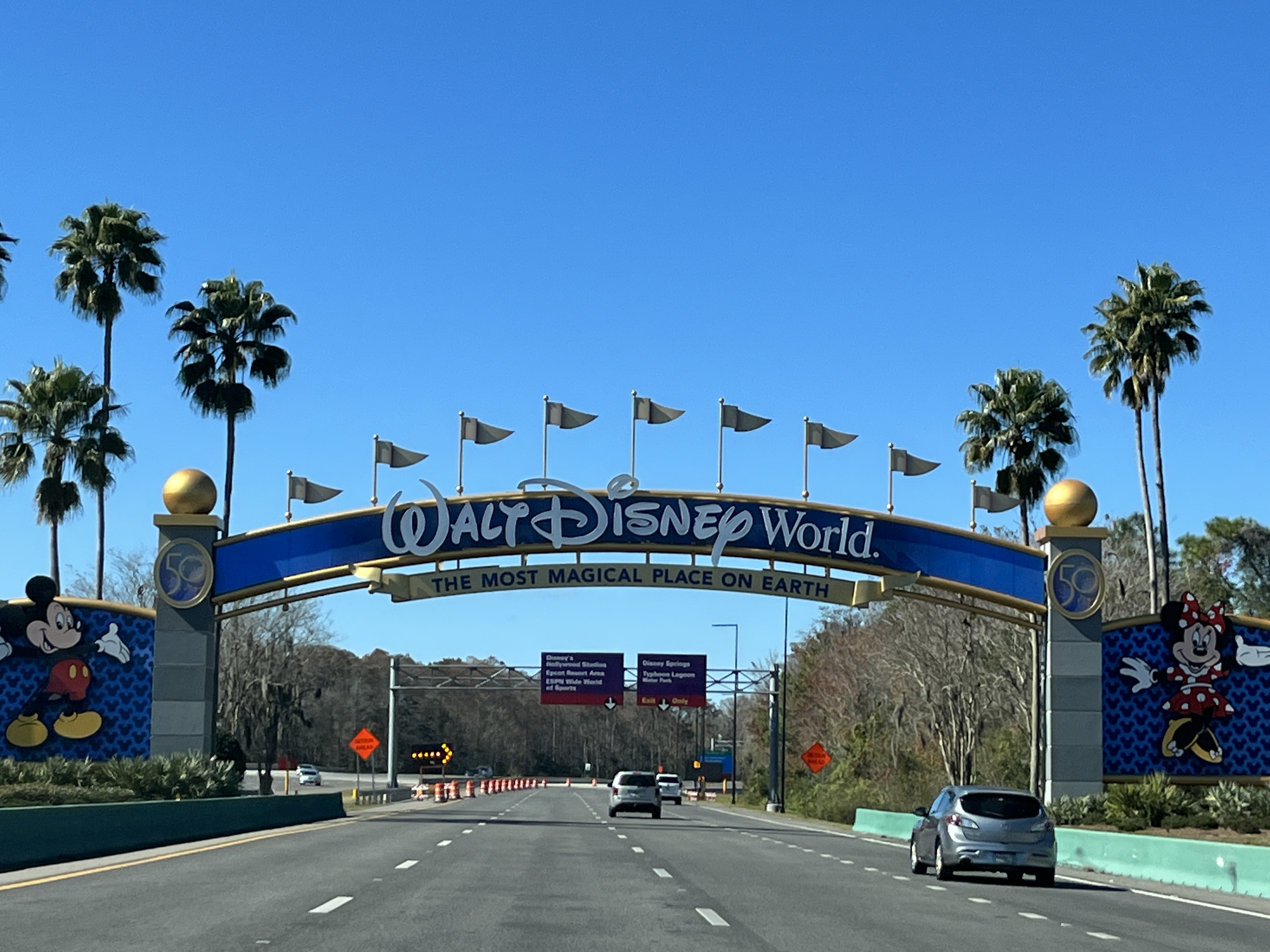
One of four arches welcoming guests to the resort

The resort is not within Orlando city limits but is southwest of Downtown Orlando. Most of the resort is in southwestern Orange County, with the remainder in adjacent Osceola County. The property includes the cities of Lake Buena Vista and Bay Lake, which are governed by the Central Florida Tourism Oversight District (formerly Reedy Creek Improvement District). The site is accessible from Central Florida's Interstate 4 via Exits 62B (World Drive), 64B (US 192 West), 65B (Osceola Parkway West), 67B (SR 536 West), and 68 (SR 535 North), Exit 6 on SR 417 South, the Central Florida GreeneWay and Exit 8 on SR 429, the Western Beltway. At its founding, the resort occupied approximately 27,443 acres (43 sq mi; 111 km^{2}). Portions of the property have since been sold or de-annexed, including land now occupied by the Disney-built community of Celebration. By 2014, the resort occupied nearly 25,000 acres (39 sq mi; 101 km^{2}) (larger than Manhattan, New York City, which is 22.7 sq mi). Major theme parks like Walt Disney World are closely connected to air travel, which helps drive both domestic and international tourism to the region.

The company additionally acquired nearly 3,000 acres (5 sq mi; 12 km^{2}), in separate transactions, between December 2018 and April 2020.

12% of the site area is occupied by hotels and resorts, and 5% of the area is water.

== Attractions ==
=== Theme parks ===
- Magic Kingdom Park – opened October 1, 1971
- EPCOT – opened October 1, 1982
- Disney's Hollywood Studios – opened May 1, 1989
- Disney's Animal Kingdom Theme Park – opened April 22, 1998

=== Water parks ===
- Disney's Typhoon Lagoon – opened June 1, 1989
- Disney's Blizzard Beach – opened April 1, 1995

=== Mini-golf courses ===
- Fantasia Gardens – opened May 20, 1996
- Winter Summerland – opened March 12, 1999

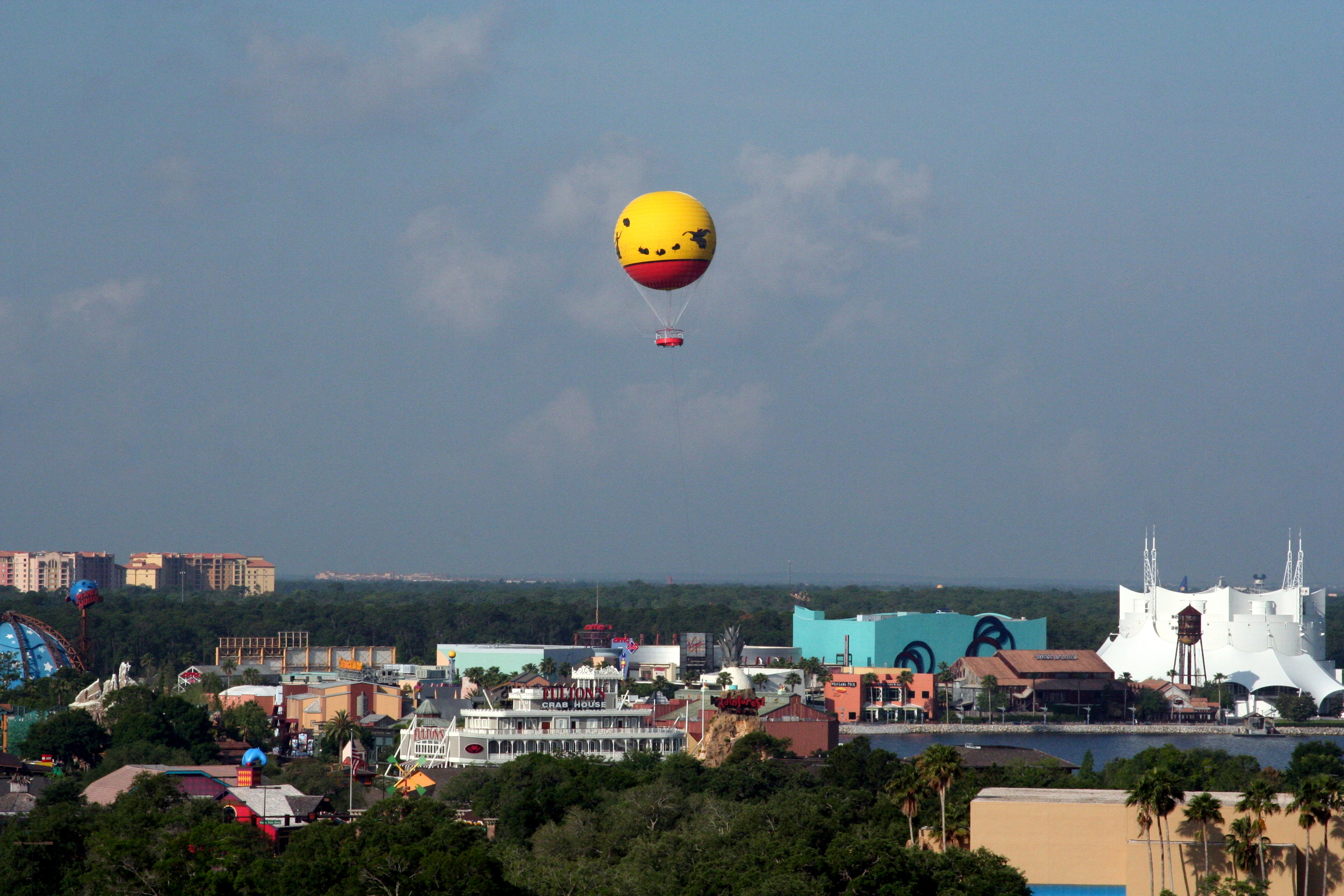
View of Disney Springs

=== Shopping, dining, and entertainment areas ===
- Disney Springs – opened March 22, 1975
- Disney's BoardWalk – opened July 1, 1996
- Flamingo Crossings – opened 2021 (located off property but developed by Disney)

=== Golf courses ===
Disney's property includes four golf courses open to the general public. The 18-hole golf courses are Disney's Palm, Disney's Magnolia, and Disney's Lake Buena Vista. There is also a nine-hole walking course called Disney's Oak Trail, that features junior tees for younger golfers and a footgolf course. Palm, Magnolia, and Oak Trail are connected and share one entrance near Shades of Green in the Magic Kingdom Resort Area, while the Lake Buena Vista course is located in the Disney Springs Resort Area. Although owned by the company, the Walt Disney World golf courses are operated by a third-party, Arnold Palmer Golf Management. The Magnolia and Palm courses played home to the PGA Tour's Walt Disney World Golf Classic from 1971 to 2012.

Additionally there is a fifth course, the Tranquilo Golf Course, located at the Four Seasons Resort on Disney property. The course is open only to guests staying at Four Seasons.

=== Other attractions and areas ===
- ESPN Wide World of Sports – sports complex, opened March 28, 1997
- Drawn to Life – resident Cirque du Soleil show, venue opened in Disney Springs on December 23, 1998
- Tri-Circle D Ranch – a working ranch and stable, located at Fort Wilderness

=== Former attractions and areas ===
- Discovery Island – an island and former ticketed attraction in Bay Lake that was home to many species of animals and birds. Guests would access the island via boat from Fort Wilderness. It opened on April 8, 1974, and closed on April 8, 1999.
- Disney's River Country – the first water park at the Walt Disney World Resort. It opened on June 20, 1976, and closed on November 2, 2001.
- Walt Disney World Speedway – a racetrack at Walt Disney World that included the Richard Petty Driving Experience, the track also held NASCAR Craftsman Truck Series and the IndyCar Series until the 2000s. It opened November 28, 1995, and closed on August 9, 2015.
- Pleasure Island – a former gated section of Downtown Disney, centered on late-night entertainment. Most of the area was demolished upon the transformation of Downtown Disney into Disney Springs. It opened 1989 and closed in 2008.
- Walt Disney World Airport – a small STOLport landing strip built for private aircraft. The airway stopped being used in the 1980s. It is located off Vista Blvd and World Drive and used as a storage area.
- DisneyQuest – an indoor theme park that featured arcade games and virtual attractions, intended to be the first location in a chain of similar theme parks, which was unsuccessful. It opened June 19, 1998 and closed on July 2, 2017.
- Crossroads Shopping Center – originally developed by Disney in the 1980s and located near Disney Springs, the shopping and dining center was popular for guests and cast-members, built at a time when there were few dining options in the area. Disney later sold the land, and in 2021 the entire center was demolished using eminent domain for the Interstate 4 reconstruction project.

== Resorts ==
As of 2024, there are 31 Disney owned and operated resort hotels and Disney Vacation Club (DVC) villas at the Walt Disney World Resort, along with one camping resort, Fort Wilderness, which includes traditional campgrounds and wood cabins. Together, they have approximately 23,000 rooms, 3,600 DVC villas and 500,000 square feet (46,000 m^{2}) of conference meeting space. They are organized into three categories—Deluxe, Moderate, and Value—and five resort areas: the Magic Kingdom, EPCOT, Wide World of Sports, Animal Kingdom, or Disney Springs. Informally known as the "Disney Bubble", staying on property is considered an immersive experience.

Additionally, 12 independently operated hotels are located on property leased from Disney, offering approximately 7,300 additional rooms. There is also an on-site pet hotel operated by Best Friends Pet Care for guests traveling with animals.

=== Disney-owned resorts ===
Name	Image	Opening date	Theme	Number of rooms	Resort area
Deluxe resorts
Disney's Animal Kingdom Lodge		April 16, 2001	African Wildlife preserve	1,307; 708 villas	Animal Kingdom
Disney's Old Key West Resort		December 20, 1991	Early-20th-century Key West	761 villas	Disney Springs
Disney's Saratoga Springs Resort & Spa		May 17, 2004	1880s Upstate New York resort	1,320 villas	Disney Springs
Disney's Beach Club Resort		November 19, 1990	Newport Beach cottage	576; 282 villas	EPCOT
Disney's Yacht Club Resort		November 5, 1990	Martha's Vineyard Resort	621	EPCOT
Disney's BoardWalk Inn		July 1, 1996	Early-20th-century Atlantic and Ocean City	378; 530 villas	EPCOT
Disney's Riviera Resort		December 16, 2019	European Riviera	489; 300 villas	EPCOT
Disney's Contemporary Resort		October 1, 1971	Modern	655; 428 villas	Magic Kingdom
Disney's Grand Floridian Resort & Spa		June 28, 1988	Early-20th-century Florida	867; 147 villas	Magic Kingdom
Disney's Polynesian Village Resort		October 1, 1971	South Pacific	492; 380 villas	Magic Kingdom
Disney's Wilderness Lodge		May 28, 1994	Pacific Northwest, National Park Service rustic	729; 365 villas	Magic Kingdom
Moderate resorts
Disney's Caribbean Beach Resort		October 1, 1988	Caribbean Islands	1,536	EPCOT
Disney's Coronado Springs Resort		August 1, 1997	Mexico, American Southwest	1,915	Animal Kingdom
Disney's Port Orleans Resort (French Quarter & Riverside)		May 17, 1991	New Orleans French Quarter, Deep South	3,056	Disney Springs
Value resorts
Disney's All-Star Movies Resort		January 15, 1999	Disney films	1,920	Animal Kingdom
Disney's All-Star Music Resort		November 22, 1994	Music	1,604	Animal Kingdom
Disney's All-Star Sports Resort		April 24, 1994	Sports	1,920	Animal Kingdom
Disney's Art of Animation Resort		May 31, 2012	Disney and Pixar animated films	1,984	Wide World of Sports
Disney's Pop Century Resort		December 14, 2003	20th Century American pop culture	2,880	Wide World of Sports
Cabins and campgrounds
Disney's Fort Wilderness Resort & Campground		November 19, 1971	Rustic Woods Camping	800 campsites 409 cabins	Magic Kingdom

=== Upcoming Disney-owned resorts ===
Name	Image	Opening date	Theme	Number of rooms	Resort area
Deluxe resorts
Disney's Lakeshore Lodge		July 1, 2027	Nature	967	Magic Kingdom

=== Former Disney-owned resorts ===
Hotel name	Image	Opening date	Close date	Theme	Number of rooms	Area
Star Wars: Galactic Starcruiser		March 1, 2022	September 30, 2023	Star Wars, Immersive entertainment	100	EPCOT

=== On-site non-Disney resorts ===
Hotel name	Image	Opening date	Number of rooms	Owner	Area
Renaissance Orlando Resort and Spa		October 1, 1972	394	Marriott International	Disney Springs
Drury Plaza Hotel Orlando		November 21, 1972	325	Drury Hotels	Disney Springs
DoubleTree Suites by Hilton Orlando		March 15, 1987	229	Hilton Worldwide	Disney Springs
Hilton Buena Vista Palace		March 10, 1983	1,014	Hilton Worldwide	Disney Springs
Hilton Lake Buena Vista		November 23, 1983	787	Hilton Worldwide	Disney Springs
Holiday Inn Orlando		February 8, 1973	323	IHG Hotels & Resorts	Disney Springs
Wyndham Lake Buena Vista		October 15, 1972	626	Wyndham Hotels & Resorts	Disney Springs
Walt Disney World Dolphin		June 1, 1990	1,509	Marriott International	EPCOT
Walt Disney World Swan		January 13, 1990	758	Marriott International	EPCOT
Walt Disney World Swan Reserve		November 4, 2021	349	Marriott International	EPCOT
Four Seasons Orlando		August 3, 2014	450	Four Seasons	Magic Kingdom
Shades of Green		December 15, 1973	586	United States Department of Defense	Magic Kingdom

== Annual events ==
The resort hosts various annual events throughout the year:

- Mickey's Not-So-Scary Halloween Party (1995–present) – held at Magic Kingdom throughout the fall season
- Mickey's Very Merry Christmas Party (1983–present) – held at Magic Kingdom throughout the holiday season
- Jollywood Nights (2023–present) – held at Disney's Hollywood Studios throughout the holiday season
- EPCOT International Food & Wine Festival (1995–present) – held at EPCOT throughout the fall season – includes the Eat To The Beat! concert series)
- EPCOT International Flower & Garden Festival (1994–present) – held at EPCOT during the spring and summer – includes the Garden Rocks! concert series
- EPCOT International Festival of the Arts (2018–present) – held at EPCOT from January until March – includes the Disney on Broadway concert series
- EPCOT International Festival of the Holidays (1996–present) – held at EPCOT throughout the holiday season
- Candlelight Processional (1971–present) – held at EPCOT throughout the holiday season
- runDisney – marathon races are conducted each year, including the Walt Disney World Half-Marathon, the Wine N Dine Half-Marathon, and the Disney Princess-Half Marathon
- H2O Glow Nights – a special ticket event held on select nights each summer at Typhoon Lagoon – night-time glow party
- Disney After Hours – a special ticket event held at select parks on select nights
- Moonlight Magic – Disney Vacation Club-only nights at select parks on select days throughout the year
- Disney Parks Christmas Day Parade (1983–present) – filmed each year at Disney World and broadcast nationally on Christmas Day

== Operations ==
=== Self-government and security ===
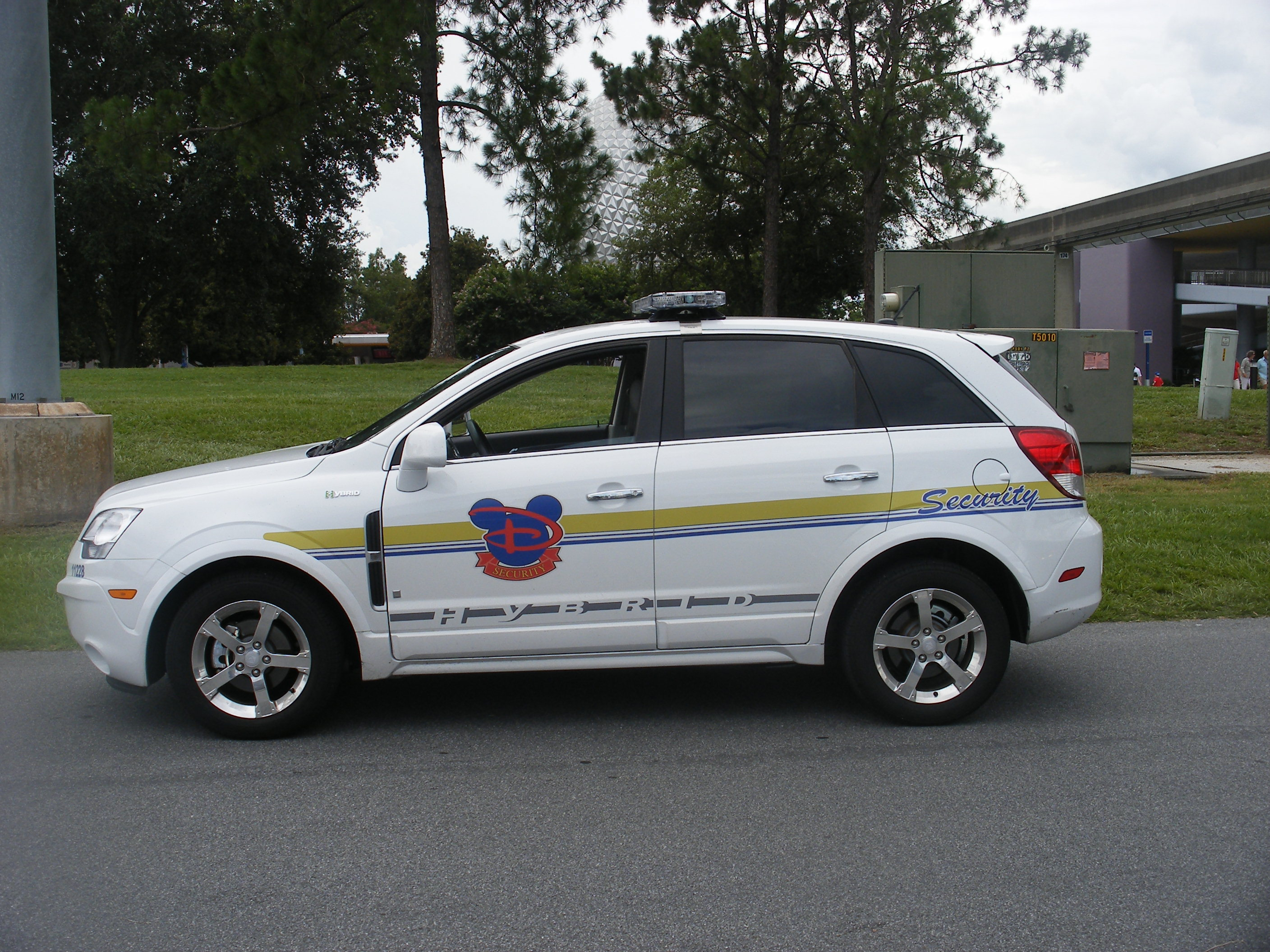
Disney security vehicle, picture taken July 2, 2009 in front of Epcot

Disney's security personnel are generally dressed in typical security guard uniforms, though some of the personnel are dressed as tourists in plain clothes. Since September 11, 2001, uniformed security has been stationed outside each Disney park in Florida to search guests' bags as they enter the parks. In late 2015, Disney confirmed the addition of randomized secondary screenings and dogs trained to detect body-worn explosives within parks, in addition to metal detectors at entrances. It has also increased the number of uniformed security personnel at Walt Disney World and Disneyland properties. Furthermore, on April 3, 2017, bag checkpoints were added to at Magic Kingdom's resort monorail entryways and the Transportation and Ticket Center's ferry entry points prior to embarkation, as well as along the walkway from Disney's Contemporary Resort. Guests arriving at the Transportation and Ticket Center by tram or tour bus are screened at the former tram boarding areas. Guests arriving by Disney Resort hotel bus or Minnie Van have their own bag check just outside the bus stops. Guests arriving via Magic Kingdom Resort boat launch are bag checked on the arrival dock outside Magic Kingdom.

The land where Walt Disney World resides is part of the Central Florida Tourism Oversight District (CFTOD), known until 2023 as the Reedy Creek Improvement District (RCID), a governing jurisdiction created in May 1967 by the State of Florida at the request of Disney. CFTOD provides 911 services, fire, environmental protection, building code enforcement, utilities and road maintenance, but does not provide law enforcement services. The approximately 800 security staff are instead considered employees of the Walt Disney Company. Arrests and citations are issued by the Florida Highway Patrol along with the Orange County and Osceola County sheriffs deputies who patrol the roads. Disney security does maintain a fleet of security vans equipped with flares, traffic cones, and chalk commonly used by police officers. These security personnel are charged with traffic control by the CFTOD and may only issue personnel violation notices to Disney and CFTOD employees, not the general public.

Despite the appearance of the uniformed security personnel, they are not considered a legal law enforcement agency. Disney and the Reedy Creek Improvement District were sued for access to Disney Security records by Bob and Kathy Sipkema following the death of their son at the resort in 1994. The court characterized Disney security as a "night watchman" service, not a law enforcement agency, meaning it is not subject to Florida's open records laws. An appeals court later upheld the lower court's ruling. The Orange County Sheriff's Office, the law enforcement agency responsible for most of Walt Disney World property, maintains an office on Disney property, but this is primarily to process guests accused of shoplifting by Disney security personnel.

Although the scattering of ashes on Disney property is illegal, The Wall Street Journal reported in October 2018 that Walt Disney World parks were becoming a popular spot for families to scatter the ashes of loved ones, with The Haunted Mansion at Magic Kingdom being the favorite location. The practice is unlawful and prohibited on Disney property, and anyone spreading cremated remains is escorted from the park.

=== Utilidors ===
At the Magic Kingdom and in the World Celebration, World Discovery and World Nature sections of Epcot are an elaborate system of utility tunnels known as utilidors. These tunnels are used exclusively by Disney employees (except for guests on a "Keys to the Kingdom" tour), to keep park support operations hidden from guest view. Specifically, the utilidors are used for waste removal, electrical operations, deliveries, food service, costuming, cast member services, and emergency services. They are accessed through unmarked doors located throughout the parks and connect to certain shops, restaurants, and attractions.

At the Magic Kingdom, the utilidor system was built almost entirely at ground level, with the park itself above them, because of an elevated water table. The southern half of Epcot, Disney's Hollywood Studios, and Disney's Animal Kingdom were not constructed with utilidors, likely because of high construction costs.

=== Energy use ===
Walt Disney World requires an estimated 1 billion kilowatt-hours (3.6 billion megajoules) of electricity annually, costing the company nearly $100 million in annual energy consumption. In addition to relying primarily on fossil fuels and nuclear energy from the state's power grid, Walt Disney World has two solar energy facilities on property; a 22-acre (0.034 sq mi; 0.089 km^{2}) Mickey Mouse-shaped solar panel farm near EPCOT, and a 270-acre (0.42 sq mi; 1.1 km^{2}) facility near Disney's Animal Kingdom. The larger facility produces enough solar energy to provide electricity to two of the resort's theme parks. The sites are operated by Duke Energy and the Central Florida Tourism Oversight District, respectively.

The entire Disney Transport bus fleet uses R50 renewable diesel fuel, obtained from used cooking oil and non-consumable food waste from the resort.

=== Closures ===
Walt Disney World has had 13 unscheduled closures, 11 of which have been due to hurricanes:

- September 15, 1999, due to Hurricane Floyd
- September 11, 2001, after the September 11 attacks
- August 13, 2004, due to Hurricane Charley
- September 4–5, 2004, due to Hurricane Frances
- September 26, 2004, due to Hurricane Jeanne
- October 25, 2005, in the morning, due to Hurricane Wilma
- October 7, 2016, due to Hurricane Matthew
- September 10–11, 2017, due to Hurricane Irma
- September 3, 2019, for about half the day (with the exception of Epcot and Disney Springs), due to Hurricane Dorian
- March 15–July 11, 2020, due to the COVID-19 pandemic. (excluding Disney Springs, which reopened on May 19, 2020)
- September 28–29, 2022, due to Hurricane Ian
- November 9–10, 2022, phased closure from the evening of November 9 until noon of the next day, due to Hurricane Nicole
- October 9–10, 2024, phased closure from afternoon of October 9, due to Hurricane Milton

Like Disneyland Resort, parks at the resort may close early to accommodate various special events, such as special press events, tour groups, VIP groups, and private parties. It is common for a corporation to rent entire parks for the evening. In such cases, special passes are issued which are valid for admission to all rides and attractions. At the ticket booths and on published schedules, the guests are notified of the early closures. Then, cast members announce that the parks are closing, sometime before the private event starts, and clear the parks of guests who do not have the special passes.

== Guest services ==
=== Transportation ===
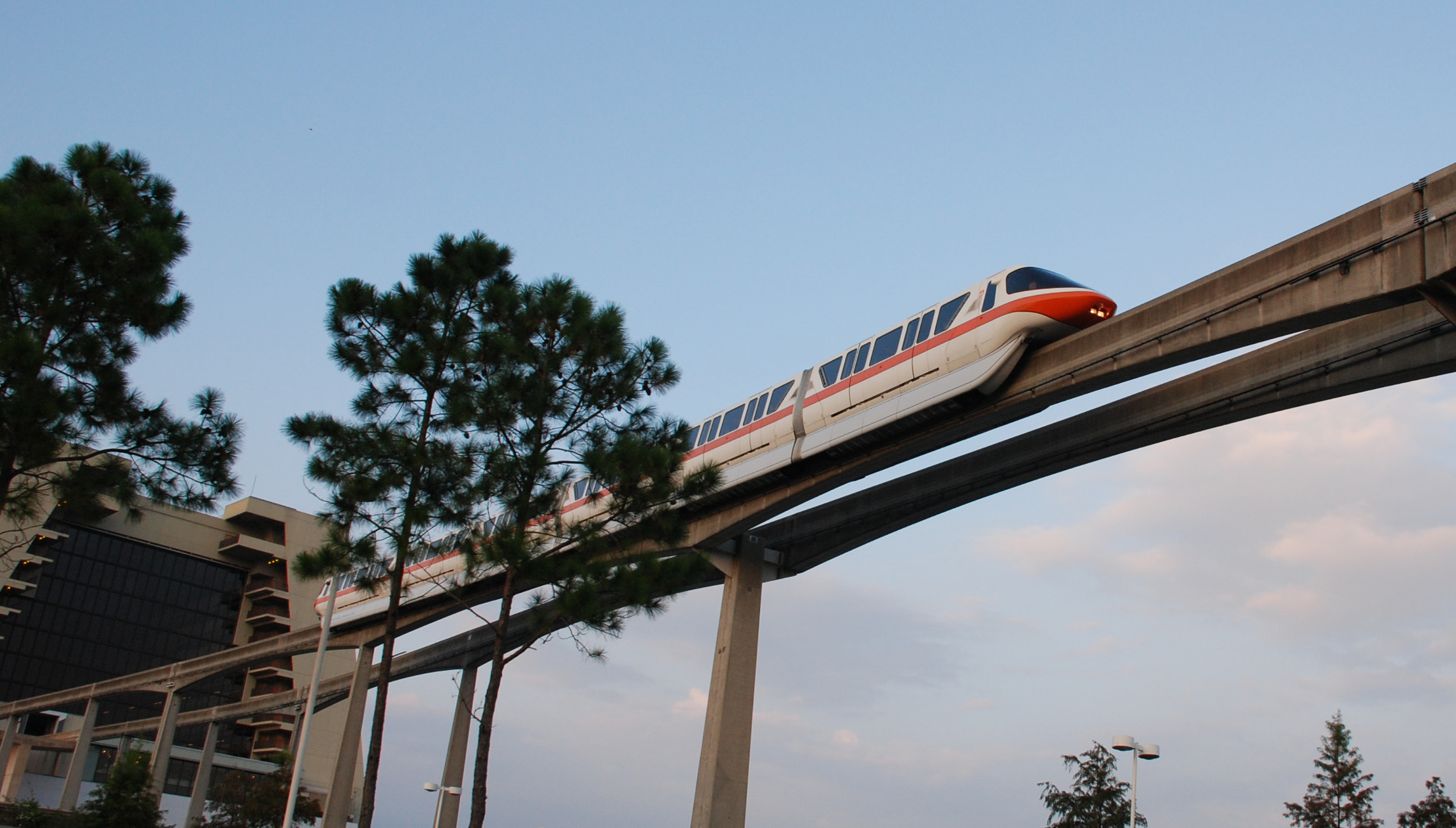
The Walt Disney World Monorail System provides free transport across the resort.

The Walt Disney World Resort is serviced by Disney Transport, a complimentary public transportation system allowing guest access across the property. The fare-free system utilizes buses, monorails, gondola lifts, watercraft, and parking lot trams.

The Walt Disney World Monorail System provides free transportation at Walt Disney World; guests can board the monorail and travel between the Magic Kingdom and EPCOT, as well as at the Polynesian Village, Grand Floridian and, Contemporary Resorts. The system operates on three routes that interconnect at the Transportation and Ticket Center (TTC), adjacent to the Magic Kingdom's parking lot. Disney Transport owns a fleet of Disney-operated buses on the property, that is also complimentary for guests.

A gondola lift system, dubbed Disney Skyliner, opened in 2019. The system's three lines connect Disney's Hollywood Studios and EPCOT with four resort hotels.

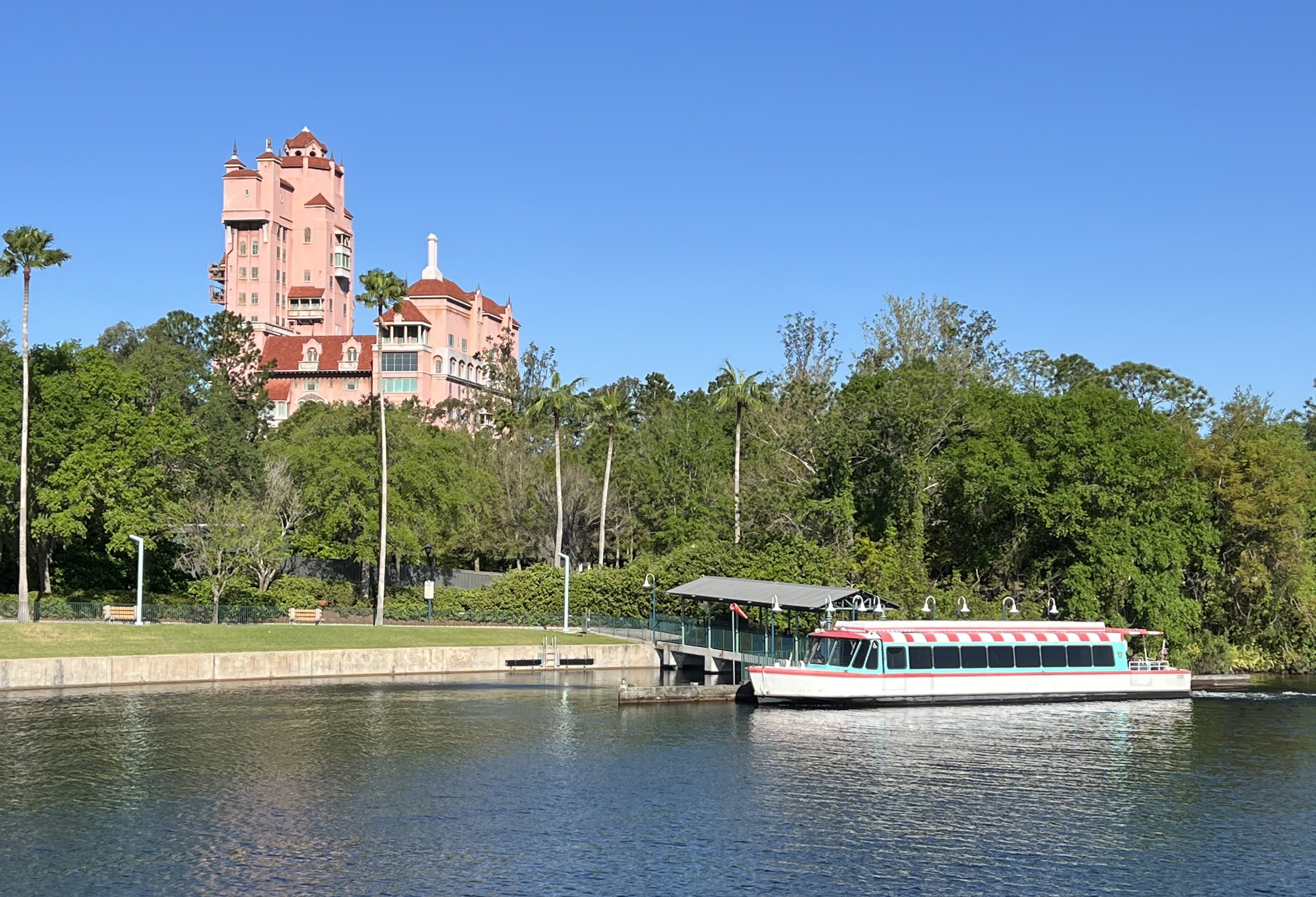
The resort's Friendship Boats can be found providing transportation between Disney's Hollywood Studios (pictured), EPCOT, and the EPCOT Resort Area.

Disney Transport also operates a fleet of watercraft, ranging in size from water taxis to the ferries that connect the Magic Kingdom to the Transportation and Ticket Center. Disney Transport is also responsible for maintaining the fleet of parking lot trams that are used for shuttling visitors between the various theme park parking lots and their respective main entrances.

In addition to its free transportation methods, in conjunction with Lyft, Walt Disney World also offers a vehicle for hire service for a fee. The Minnie Van Service are Chevy Traverses dressed in a Minnie Mouse red-and-white polka dot design that can accommodate up to six people and have two child car seats available to anyone that is within the Walt Disney World Resort limits. Some of the unique advantages that the Minnie Van Service offers over a normal ride share is the ability to be dropped off in the Magic Kingdom bus loop (instead of at the TTC like the other ride shares) and being able to ride to any point within Fort Wilderness.

=== Lightning Lane ===
For an additional fee, guests can purchase Lightning Lane Single Pass and/or Lightning Lane Multi Pass, which admits guests to a separate line for select attractions at the four theme parks. Guests can purchase Lightning Lane passes up to seven days before their arrival at the resort. Purchasing Lightning Lane Multi Pass allows a guest to "pre-book" three attractions before their arrival (with the ability to "book" more attractions once they physically ride a "pre-booked" attraction), whereas Lightning Lane Single Pass allows a guest to "pre-book" one high-demand attraction à-la-carte.

=== Disney Dining Plan ===
The Disney Dining Plan is a prepaid meal package offered for guests of on-site hotels. The plan is particularly cost-effective for families who intend to eat many meals at sit-down restaurants or character dining restaurants. However, to get the most value (or to break even) when using the plan, families must be mindful when using their Dining Plan Credits; otherwise, they may risk spending more than if they ordered the same food but paid out of pocket.

=== Additional services ===
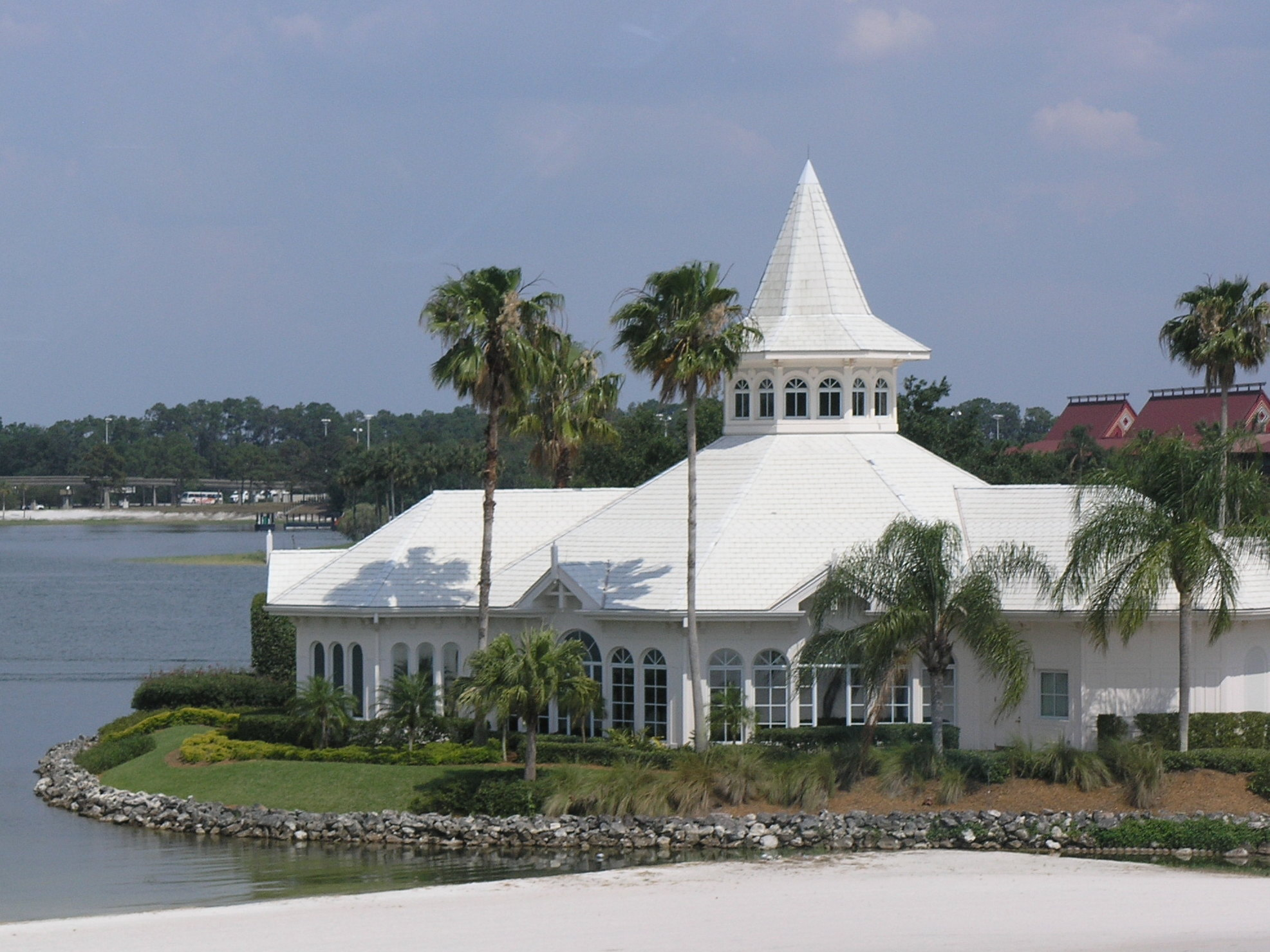
Wedding Pavilion at the Seven Seas Lagoon

Walt Disney World has several departments that handle various activities and events that are offered throughout the year. These departments include:

- Disney Imagination Campus – operates Magic Music Days, Disney Performing Arts, Festival Disney, The Dreamers Academy, and other youth programs providing opportunities for youth to learn and perform inside Walt Disney World.
- Disney Meetings and Events – schedules large meetings, events, and conferences at Walt Disney World.
- The Disney Institute – offers professional development, team-building and networking opportunities using Disney models and principles.
- Disney's Fairy Tale Weddings & Honeymoons – schedules and plans weddings at various locations inside Walt Disney World, including locations inside the parks or at the wedding pavilion.
- Disney Internships and Programs – operates various internships geared toward college-age students, including the Disney College Program (DCP), Disney International Programs (ICP), Disney Hospitality Leadership Program (DHLP), Cultural Representative Program (CRP), Brazilian Summer Super Greeters, Disney Culinary Program, and Professional Internships (PI).

== Corporate presence ==
=== Corporate jargon ===
Walt Disney World's corporate culture uses jargon based on theatrical terminology. For example, park visitors are always "guests", employees are called "Cast Members", rides are "attractions" or "experiences", cast members costumed as famous Disney characters in a way that does not cover their faces are known as "face characters", jobs are "roles", and public and nonpublic areas are respectively labeled "onstage" and "backstage".

=== Corporate offices ===
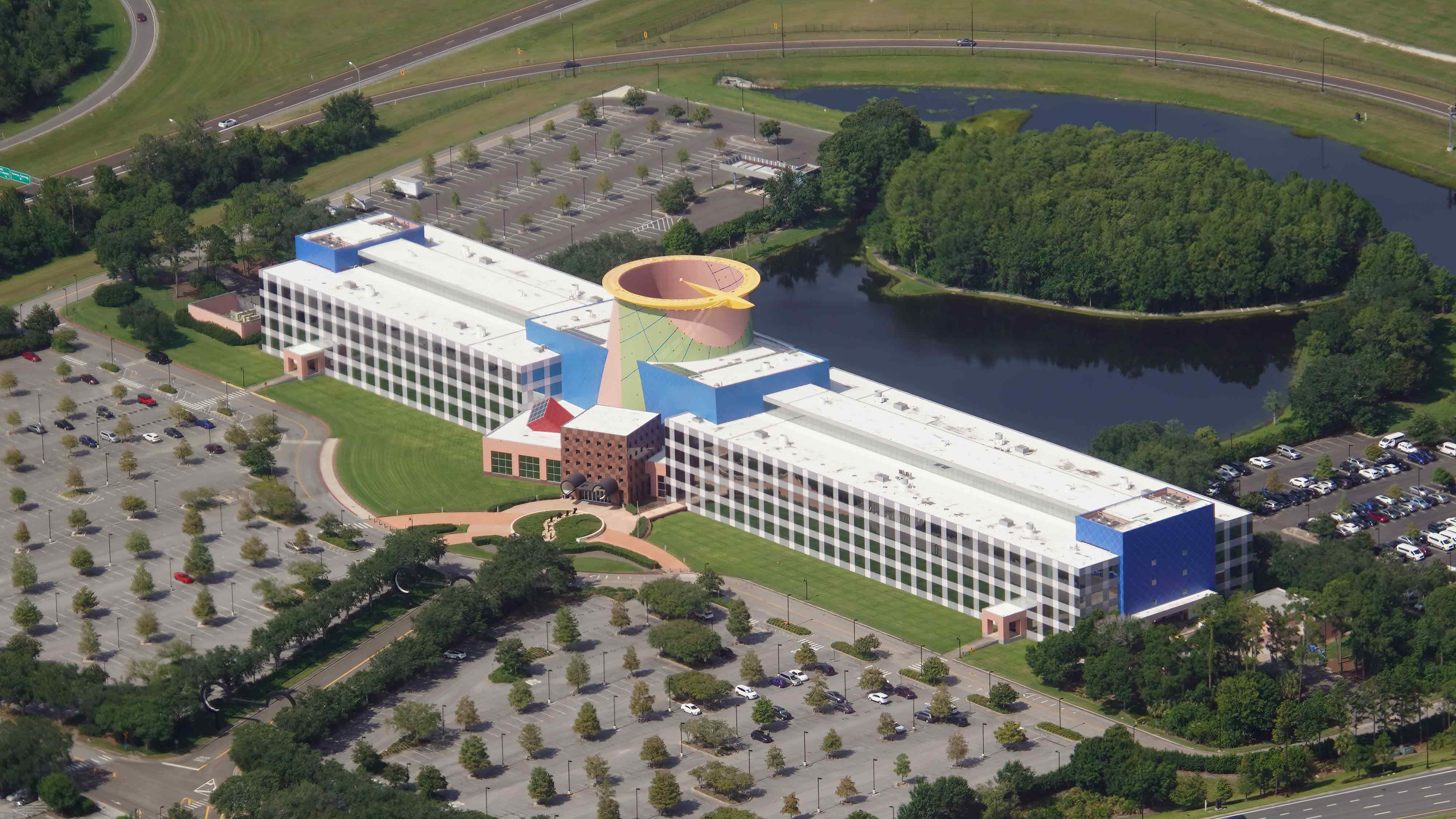
Aerial view of the Team Disney Orlando building

Walt Disney World includes numerous buildings and spaces used solely for corporate management, Cast Member-only services, and Cast Member-recreation. The Walt Disney Company also owns and operates a corporate office complex in Celebration, Florida, home to Disney Cruise Line and Adventures by Disney offices. Offices located on Walt Disney World property include:

- Team Disney Orlando – the central location of corporate offices at Walt Disney World.
- Disney University – the central location of training for Cast Members.
- Walt Disney World Casting Center – the central location for human resources and employee recruitment and retention.
- Partners Federal Credit Union – an internal bank system only for Disney employees, with several locations throughout Walt Disney World.
- Disney Event Group – office complex for various business segments.
- Maingate Office Complex – houses offices for various business segments.
- Amateur Athletic Union – corporate office building located inside the historic preview center building on Hotel Plaza Boulevard.
- Central Florida Tourism Oversight District – headquarters building, located near Disney Springs on Hotel Plaza Boulevard.
- Mickey's Retreat – a Disney-employee only recreational complex located on Little Lake Bryan.
- AdventHealth – operates two freestanding emergency rooms, located on the east and west of property near Disney Springs and in Flamingo Crossings. Guests with critical conditions and injuries are transported to the larger AdventHealth Celebration.
- YMCA of Central Florida – operates two locations on property that provide daycare and educational programs for children of Walt Disney World employees.
- The Center for Living Well – operates a clinic providing health services for Disney employees, operated by Premise Health.
- Flamingo Crossings Village – home of Disney Programs and Internship participants.

=== Employment ===
When the Magic Kingdom opened in 1971, the site employed about 5,500 employees, referred to by Disney as "Cast Members". As of 2025, Walt Disney World employs over 80,000 people. Walt Disney World has more than 3,000 job classifications with a total 2019 payroll of over $3 billion.

Almost all hourly guest-facing Cast Members work under union contracts. The most recent contract was negotiated and put in effect in 2023 and is valid through 2027, setting the starting hourly rate for part-time and full-time Cast at 17 dollars per hour, with additional premiums available for select roles. Union membership is offered to all Cast eligible at the start of employment. Each staff location on property has an official designated as shop steward, who bargains with Disney leadership when needed to defend the rights designated within the contract. Unions that represent Walt Disney World Cast Members include:

- UNITE HERE Local 362 – Represents roles in Attractions, Custodial, and Vacation Planning.
- Transportation Communications International Union
  - Local 737 – Represents housekeeping and food and beverage cast.
  - Local 1908 – Represents numerous roles including concierge, lifeguards, bell services, and monorail and watercraft cast.
- United Food and Commercial Workers Local 1625 – Represents merchandise cast.
- International Brotherhood of Teamsters Local 385 – Represents entertainment, bus drivers, laundry cast and parking cast.
- International Alliance of Theatrical Stage Employees Local 361 – Represents costuming, cosmetologists, and entertainment technicians.
- Actors' Equity Association Orlando Area Theatre – Represents members performing under contract at Walt Disney World, including casts of Festival of The Lion King, Voices of Liberty, The Dapper Dans, Mickey's Royal Friendship Faire, Beauty and the Beast: Live on Stage, Indiana Jones Stunt Spectacular, the Hoop-Dee-Do Review, and Finding Nemo: The Big Blue and Beyond.

== Impact ==
=== Economic impact ===
The opening of Walt Disney World transformed Central Florida from a more simple agrarian-based economy into an international tourist destination, contributing to major growth in the region—the Orlando metropolitan area grew from just over 500,000 people in 1970 to over 2.3 million people in 2014. Today, the resort is the largest single-site employer in the United States, employing over 80,000 people as of 2025. Additionally, The Walt Disney Company generated $40.3 billion in total economic impact for Florida and 263,000 total jobs in the state (including 1 out of every 8 jobs in Central Florida), contracting services with over 2,500 local businesses. In 2022, Disney also generated $6.6 billion in taxes, including $3.1 billion in state and local taxes.

Walt Disney World's presence has also encouraged several other theme parks and entertainment complexes to develop in Central Florida, including competitors Universal Orlando and SeaWorld Orlando. The concentration of tourist destinations has only further developed the tourist economy of Central Florida.

=== In popular culture ===
Walt Disney World has had a major influence on American popular culture since its opening, appearing in many forms of media, especially television and film. Since its opening, the resort has been used as the setting of episodes of many American sitcoms (known as "Disney episodes"), including Boy Meets World, Full House, and Modern Family; many of these sitcoms originally aired on ABC, which has been owned by The Walt Disney Company since 1995.

The phrase "I'm going to Disney World!" was popularized by a series of television commercials that began to air in 1987, typically following the Super Bowl and featuring an NFL player (usually the Super Bowl MVP) shouting the phrase while celebrating the team's victory immediately after the championship game. The commercial still airs in some form to this day.

== Attendance ==
In the first year of opening, the Magic Kingdom attracted 10,712,991 visitors. In 2024, the resort's four theme parks all ranked in the top 15 on the list of the 25 most visited theme parks in the world: The Magic Kingdom at first, EPCOT at eighth, Disney's Hollywood Studios at ninth, and Disney's Animal Kingdom at fifteenth. Visitor satisfaction and overall park experience are important factors in whether tourists choose to return to Walt Disney World.

Year	Magic Kingdom	EPCOT	Hollywood Studios	Animal Kingdom	Overall	Ref.
2008	17,063,000	10,935,000	9,608,000	9,540,000	47,146,000	
2009	17,233,000	10,990,000	9,700,000	9,590,000	47,513,000	
2010	16,972,000	10,825,000	9,603,000	9,686,000	47,086,000	
2011	17,142,000	10,826,000	9,699,000	9,783,000	47,450,000	
2012	17,536,000	11,063,000	9,912,000	9,998,000	48,509,000	
2013	18,588,000	11,229,000	10,110,000	10,198,000	50,125,000	
2014	19,332,000	11,454,000	10,312,000	10,402,000	51,500,000	
2015	20,492,000	11,798,000	10,828,000	10,922,000	54,040,000	
2016	20,395,000	11,712,000	10,776,000	10,844,000	53,727,000	
2017	20,450,000	12,200,000	10,722,000	12,500,000	55,872,000	
2018	20,859,000	12,444,000	11,258,000	13,750,000	58,311,000	
2019	20,963,000	12,444,000	11,483,000	13,888,000	58,778,000	
2020	6,941,000	4,044,000	3,675,000	4,166,000	18,826,000	
2021	12,691,000	7,752,000	8,589,000	7,194,000	36,226,000	
2022	17,133,000	10,000,000	10,900,000	9,027,000	47,060,000	
2023	17,720,000	11,980,000	10,300,000	8,770,000	48,770,000	
2024	17,836,000	12,133,000	10,333,000	8,800,000	49,102,000	

== See also ==
- Florida tourism industry
- Large amusement railways
- List of Disney attractions that were never built
- List of Disney theme park attractions
- List of incidents at Walt Disney World
- Rail transport in Walt Disney Parks and Resorts
- Walt Disney Travel Company
- The Walt Disney World Explorer
- Walt Disney World Hospitality and Recreation Corporation
