= Disney University =

Global training program of The Walt Disney Company

Coordinates: 28°25′41″N 81°34′42″W

- Former name: University of Disneyland
- Established: 1955; 71 years ago in Anaheim, California, United States
- Founder: Van France
- Parent institution: The Walt Disney Company

Disney University (DU), formerly known as University of Disneyland, is the global training program for employees of the parks and experiences divisions at The Walt Disney Company also known as Cast Members. Many college students can participate through the Disney college program. The Disney college program is a full-time paid internship at Walt Disney World in Orlando, Florida. Students can receive academic credit while building their resume.

Although Disney University is a non-accredited institution, courses are primarily designed, developed, and delivered by experienced professionals. However, in order to enroll, one needs to be enrolled in an accredited college that will allow the student to take classes and work at Disney. Most colleges allowing it have internships available, and give college credit to do the internship while taking Disney classes. Disney University has traditionally provided learning instructor-led classroom sessions, but eventually expanded delivery methods to accommodate Disney's diverse and growing audience with the advent of eLearning and virtual classrooms.

All new cast members attend traditions on their first day of work. This class reviews Disney culture, heritage, values, and policies through media and group activities, and is the day where new cast members get their first sight of backstage.

== History ==
=== Founding ===
In 1954, Van France met with Walt Disney at the Walt Disney Studios complex in Burbank, California. With the opening of Disneyland fast approaching, Walt needed to find someone to develop the employee orientation and training process for the new park. At 42 years old, France already had plenty of experience as a trainer for manufacturing companies, such as an auto assembly plant and an aircraft factory, and in the U.S. Army as a training specialist. Impressed by the Disney Studios campus, and knowing Walt had already spent millions of his own to create the park, Van accepted Walt's job offer.

In addition to Walt Disney, Van would also credit Dick Nunis, the former chairman of Walt Disney Parks & Resorts, as one other driving force behind Disney University. Van originally hired Dick as his assistant, and was one of the first people hired at Disneyland. Dick was brought on board to assist in creating the first employee orientation and training program.

What happens "backstage" will end up "on-stage." If we aren't friendly with each other...smiling and saying "good morning" and things like that, then we'll have a similar attitude toward our guests.

— Van A. France, founder and Professor emeritus, Disney Universities

=== The Florida Project ===
For the opening of Walt Disney World in Orlando, Florida, Jim Cora was tasked with implementing the "Disney Way of Leadership" program for Disney University.

=== Japanese Expansion ===
With a degree in International Business Communications, and Japanese Language and History, Doug Lipp was hired by The Walt Disney Company's marketing department, in 1981. His role, which was based out of Anaheim, was to interpret for Japanese officials, during the planning and development of the first international park, Tokyo Disneyland. Doug was fast tracked through Disney's management training program and promoted to a leadership position with Disney University. He was then transferred to Japan to lead the newly established Disney University Tokyo office, where he spent two years hiring and training 4,000 employees for the new park.

== Campuses ==
Disney University is also the name of the training locations where Disney Cast Members attend classroom sessions. Buildings are located at Walt Disney World near Orlando, Florida, Disneyland's Team Disney Anaheim, near Disneyland, and Burbank's Team Disney Headquarters.

=== Walt Disney World ===
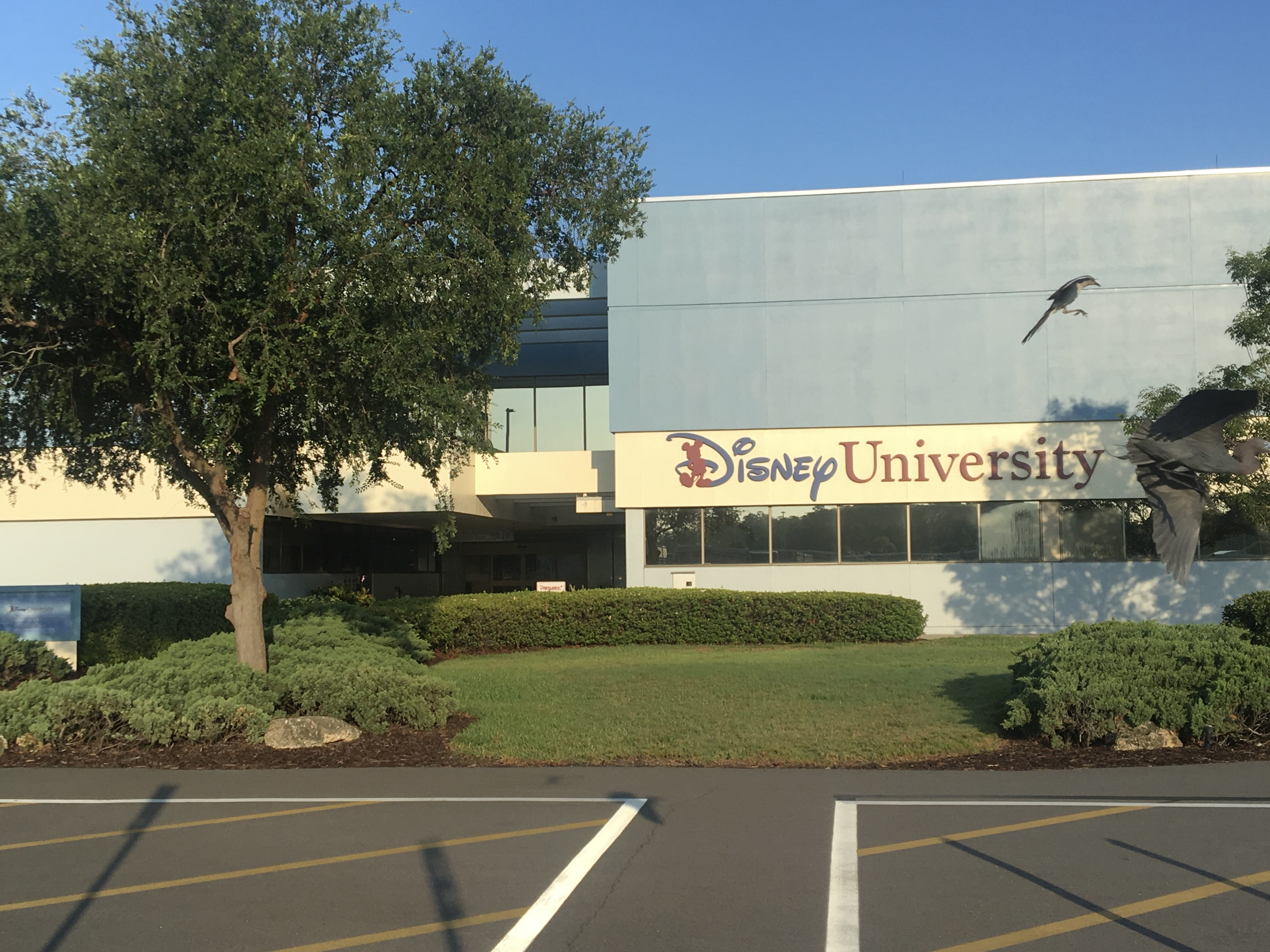
The main entrance to the Disney University building located behind Magic Kingdom at Walt Disney World in Orlando, Florida.

The Walt Disney World building is located behind the Magic Kingdom, across from the Cast Member parking lot. It is also where newly hired Cast Members, Disney College Program student interns, and Disney International Programs participants attend employee orientation, known as "Disney Traditions".

All new employees attend a Disney Traditions Class on their first day. After a formal training period, employees continue to their job locations for further on-site training.

The two-story building at Walt Disney World houses several learning and conference spaces, computer classrooms, professional offices, building operation support (Production Services), the Disney University Library (formerly Disney Learning Center), Partners Federal Credit Union branch and ATM, a SodexoMAGIC cafeteria, and a Company D employee store, where employees can purchase discounted park tickets for family and friends.

=== Disneyland ===
Disney University does not have its own specific building at Disneyland, but the training classes are held inside of conference rooms Team Disney Anaheim.

== Disney College Program ==
=== Overview ===
The Disney College Program, or DCP for short, is an internship that allows students enrolled in, or recently graduated from college, the opportunity to work full-time at Walt Disney World. This internship is offered for both the fall and spring semesters and can last anywhere from four months to a year, depending on how long the student wishes to stay. The students will be placed to work in one of the four Disney parks, any of the resorts, Disney Springs, or one of the two waterparks.

=== Application Process ===
Applications for the Disney College Program are only open for a short period of time for each semester. Once the student fills out the application with all of their information, they then wait for what is called a "web-based interview". If they are chosen for a web-based interview, they have to answer a series of multiple-choice questions regarding their work experience and their work ethics. Once they submit their answers for the web-based interview, they then wait to hear back if they were selected for a phone interview, which is the last step in the application process. If they pass the phone interview, they are able to give their preferences for where they would like to work, but these are just preferences and Disney can place them wherever.

=== After Getting Accepted ===
Accepted participants must complete several administrative steps before the internship start date. These include submitting paperwork and personal information to Disney, indicating housing preferences, and specifying whether they will bring a vehicle. Approximately one month before the program begins, participants receive their general program role—such as food and beverage, merchandise, or custodial work—which indicates the type of work but not a specific location. About one week before the start date, Disney provides the exact work assignment.

=== Housing ===
Disney offers apartments for students who are on the Disney College Program. This apartment complex is called Flamingo Crossings Village. This is similar to college style living, in the sense that there is security checking people in and out of the complex and you are required to live with three other students. There are three different types of apartments you can be placed in. There is a two bedroom two bathroom, where you are sharing a bedroom and bathroom with another person. A four bedroom two bathroom, where you have your own room, but share a bathroom with another person. And lastly, a four bedroom four bathroom, where you have a private room and private bathroom. The students get to put in their preference on what apartment they get, but just like getting their job, it is just a preference and there is no way to guarantee what they get. The three rooms are all different prices with the most expensive being the 4x4 and the cheapest being the 2x2. The rent is taken out of the students pay check each week. The students are also able to bring their cars if they are able to purchase a parking pass. These parking passes are first come first serve, so it is not guaranteed that they student will get one. If they do not have a car, Flamingo does offer transportation for the students. The buses go everywhere on Disney property that they students would need to go and also go to Target, so the students are able to go grocery shopping.

=== During The Program ===
On the program, students are required to work full-time hours each week. The students do however, get benefits while working for the company. They are given a "self-admission" pass, which allows them to get into the Disney parks for free. The reservation system still does apply, however, and there are certain block out dates that prevent cast members from going into the parks. But, as long as they have a reservation and are not blocked out, they can get into the parks on their days off, or before or after work. They are also rewarded complimentary admission tickets after working a certain amount of hours that they are able to use for their family and friends that visit them on their program. Along with free admission to the parks, the students are also given a Disney Cast Member discount. This is a 20% discount on merchandise and a 40% discount during the holiday season. This also includes discounts for the Disney resorts.

=== College Credit ===
The Disney College Program does not confer college credit, unless recognized by the student's educational institution as an internship. Contrary to some expectations, Disney does not offer formal college courses as part of the program. However, participants can access beneficial resources such as resume workshops and career-oriented classes, which may be advantageous for those considering long-term employment opportunities within the Disney organization.
