= Drury Hotels =

American hospitality company

Drury Hotels Company, LLC
- Type: Private
- Industry: Hospitality
- Founded: 1973
- Headquarters: Creve Coeur, Missouri, U.S.
- Key people: Charles L. Drury, Jr. (CEO)
- Products: Hotels
- Number of employees: 6,000 (2024)
- Website: www.druryhotels.com

Drury Hotels Company, LLC is an American hospitality company that operates a chain of mid-scale limited service hotels under the brands Drury Inn and Suites, Drury Plaza Hotel, and Pear Tree Inn. As of 2026, the chain operates more than 150 locations in 30 states. It is wholly owned by the Drury family and is headquartered in metropolitan St. Louis, Missouri.

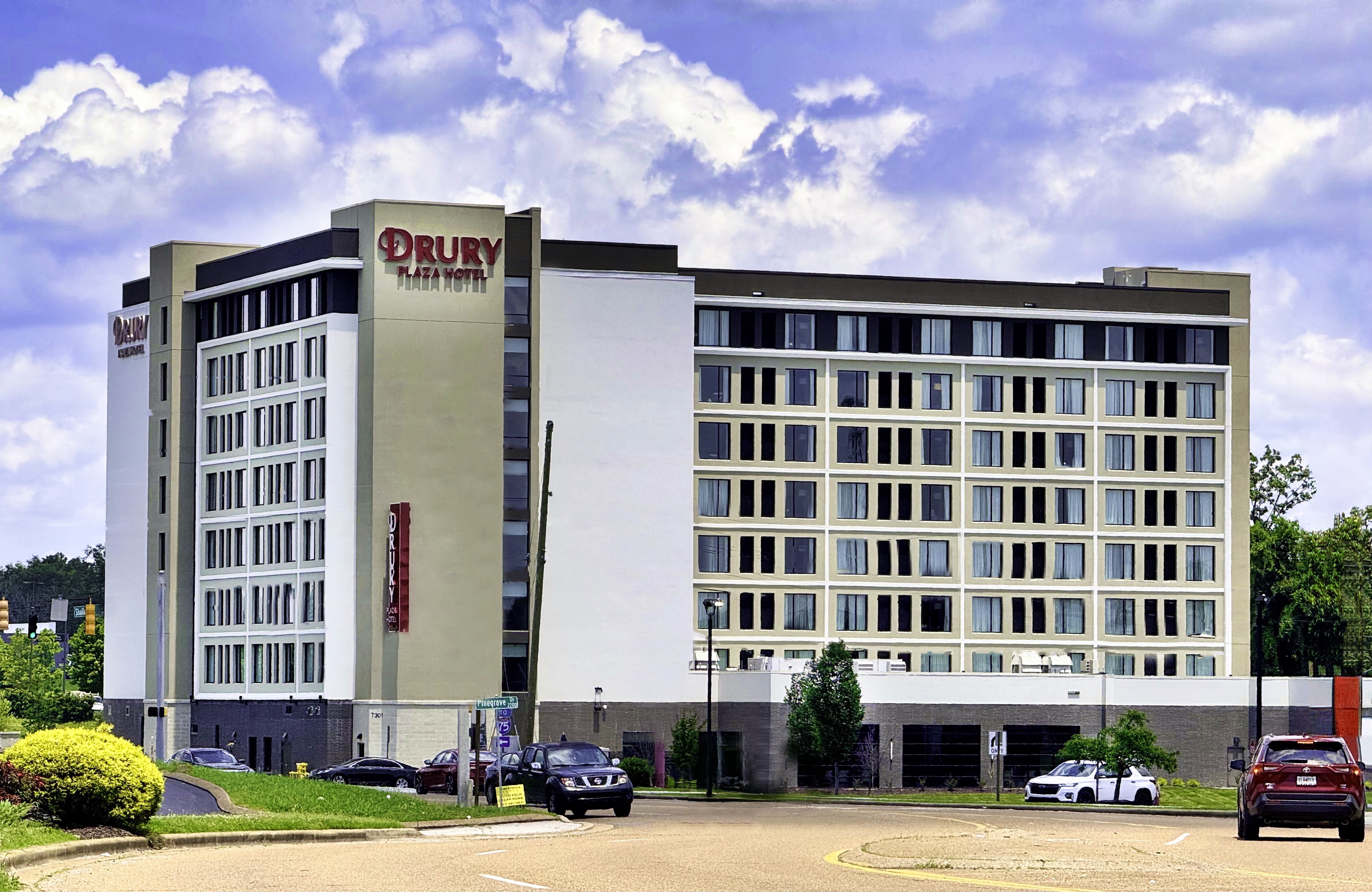
Drury Plaza Hotel in Chattanooga, Tennessee

== History ==
The company was founded by Charles, James, & Robert Drury. They were the sons of Lambert Drury, a farmer who lost his farm during the Great Depression, and then founded a plastering company. The Drury Development Corporation was founded in 1959. The Drury family built its first hotel, a Holiday Inn, in 1962 in Cape Girardeau, Missouri. The family started Drury Hotels in 1973 and built its first Drury Inn in Sikeston, Missouri. The Drury Hotels company operates non-Drury hotels as well. In the 1990s, the chain introduced a third brand, Thrifty Inn.

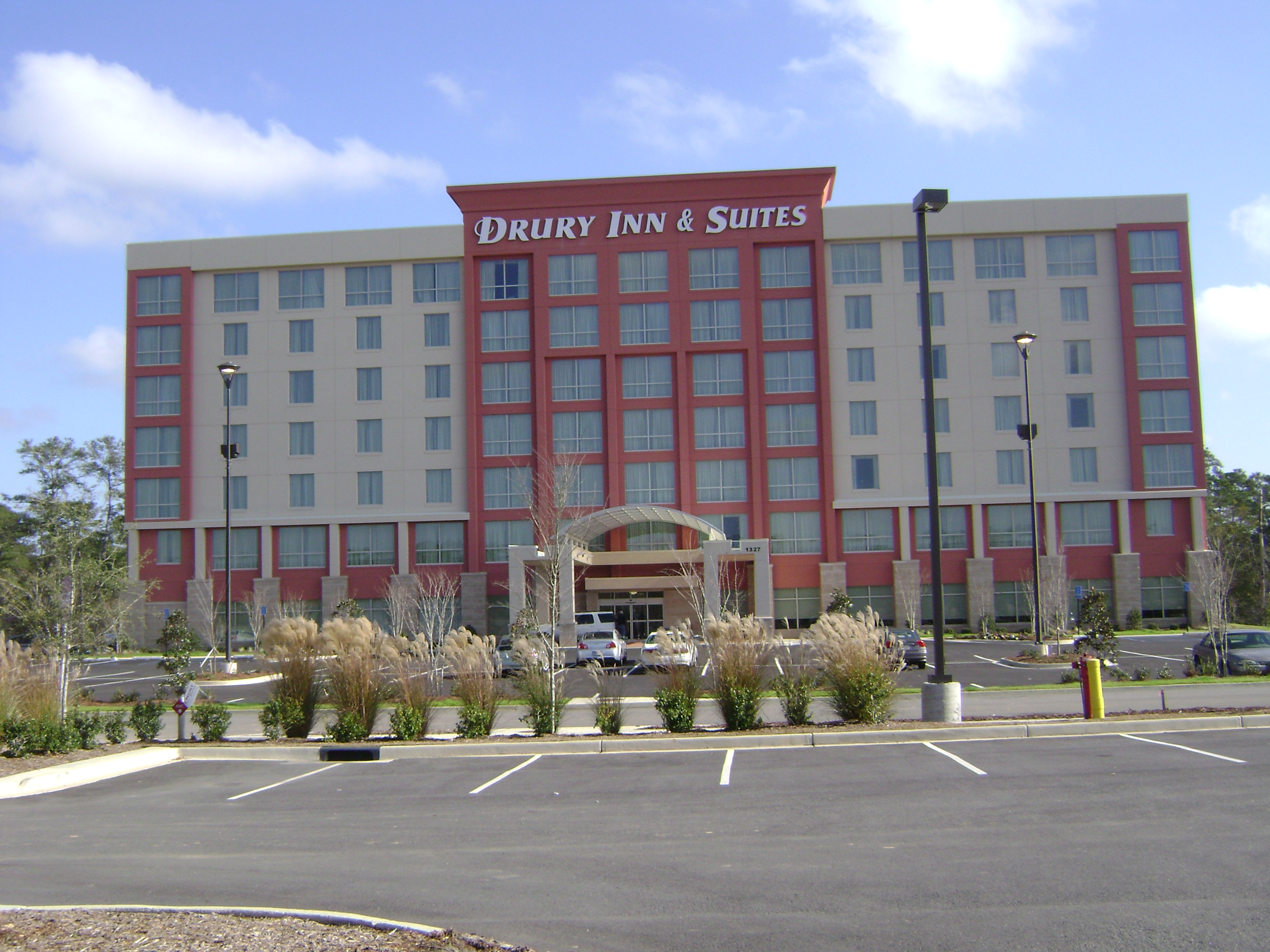
The Drury Inn & Suites in Valdosta, Georgia

Co-founder Charles Drury died on September 7, 2020, in St. Louis; his death was acknowledged by Governor of Missouri Mike Parson. Two other co-founders, James and Robert, died in 2008 and 2013, respectively.

In 2025, Drury Hotels earned its 19th J.D. Power award for highest guest satisfaction for their upscale hotels.

== Renovation of historic buildings ==
The chain has purchased several historic buildings for renovation as hotels. Historic buildings that the chain has renovated into hotels include the Union Market in St. Louis (originally built in 1925), the former Cleveland Board of Education building in Cleveland (originally built in 1931) the former City Public Service Building (originally built in 1921) and the former Alamo National Bank building (originally built in 1929) in San Antonio; a hotel in Wichita, Kansas originally built in 1922 a former Sisters of Charity dormitory and hospital in Santa Fe, originally built in 1910 and the early 1950s; and three St. Louis properties originally built in the late 19th and early 20th centuries. The former Federal Reserve building in Pittsburgh was renovated into a 207-room hotel and opened in late 2016. At the Pittsburgh hotel, a former firing range was converted into an indoor pool, and former bank vaults were turned into meeting spaces. It also plans to renovate the former First Financial Centre building in Milwaukee and the former Indianapolis Business Journal building in Indianapolis, which dates to 1924.

== Controversies ==
In 2013 Drury Hotels filed an amicus brief challenging the Affordable Care Act provision requiring payment for emergency contraception for women. Due to the controlling family members' Catholic faith, they argued that providing funding for such care would be contrary to their faith. CEO Charles Drury has further stated they would not comply or pay for that mandate.
