= Partners Federal Credit Union =

American credit union

- Company type: Credit union
- Industry: Financial services
- Founded: 1968; 58 years ago
- Headquarters: Burbank, California, United States
- Area served: Walt Disney Company employees and their families
- Products: Savings; checking; consumer loans; mortgages; credit cards; online banking
- Total assets: $1B USD
- Number of employees: 315
- Website: partnersfcu.org

Partners Federal Credit Union is a federally chartered credit union with corporate headquarters in Burbank, California. The not-for-profit financial cooperative offers membership to employees and cast members of The Walt Disney Company and their family members. As of December 2016, the credit union has thirteen branches, in excess of 180,000 members and over $1.9 billion in assets.

== History ==
The credit union was formed in 1968 at the request of a group of Disneyland Park cast members, and when first chartered was called the DRC Federal Credit Union. DRC was an acronym for the Disneyland Recreational Club, which was a precursor to the Disneyland Resort's current Cast Activities department. The offices moved a number of times before relocating off Disneyland's traditional premises: The first office was a couple of rooms behind the camera shop on Main Street. Al Yee, a Disneyland accountant, was the first member and had account number 1 until his death. The DRC building in the 1970s was a double-wide "temporary" building, externally decorated with a contemporary Studio look with planter boxes and a wood exterior. It was located in the center of the employees' backstage area, east of Main Street, U.S.A., west of the original park's Administration Building, and south of the current location of Space Mountain (what was then called the Temporary Tomorrowland Stage). Sometime before the end of 1977, the building was moved to the area just inside of the tall chainlink fence on Harbor Blvd and a bit north of the original employee entry (what Disneyland Security called Harbor House) for the employees' parking lot that was on the east side of the original property.

In the 1970s, DRC Federal Credit Union changed its name to Disneyland Employees Federal Credit Union. In the 1980s, at the request of CEO Michael Eisner, the credit union was asked to stop using the name "Disneyland" so the name was changed once again to Partners Federal Credit Union.

Partners merged with Vista Federal Credit Union in November 2007. Vista FCU, which was established in 1960 prior to Partners, also served Walt Disney Company Cast Members and employees primarily of The Walt Disney Studios in Burbank, California and Walt Disney World Resort in Lake Buena Vista, Florida.

== Membership eligibility ==
Originally, membership in Partners FCU was limited to Walt Disney Company employees working in Orange County, California. When the Walt Disney Company took over management of the RMS Queen Mary in Long Beach in 1988, employees working for that attraction were added to the field of membership. In 2001, the field of membership for Partners FCU was expanded to cover any employee or Cast Member working for the Walt Disney Company in the United States.
