= Disney Transport =

Transportation system of Walt Disney World

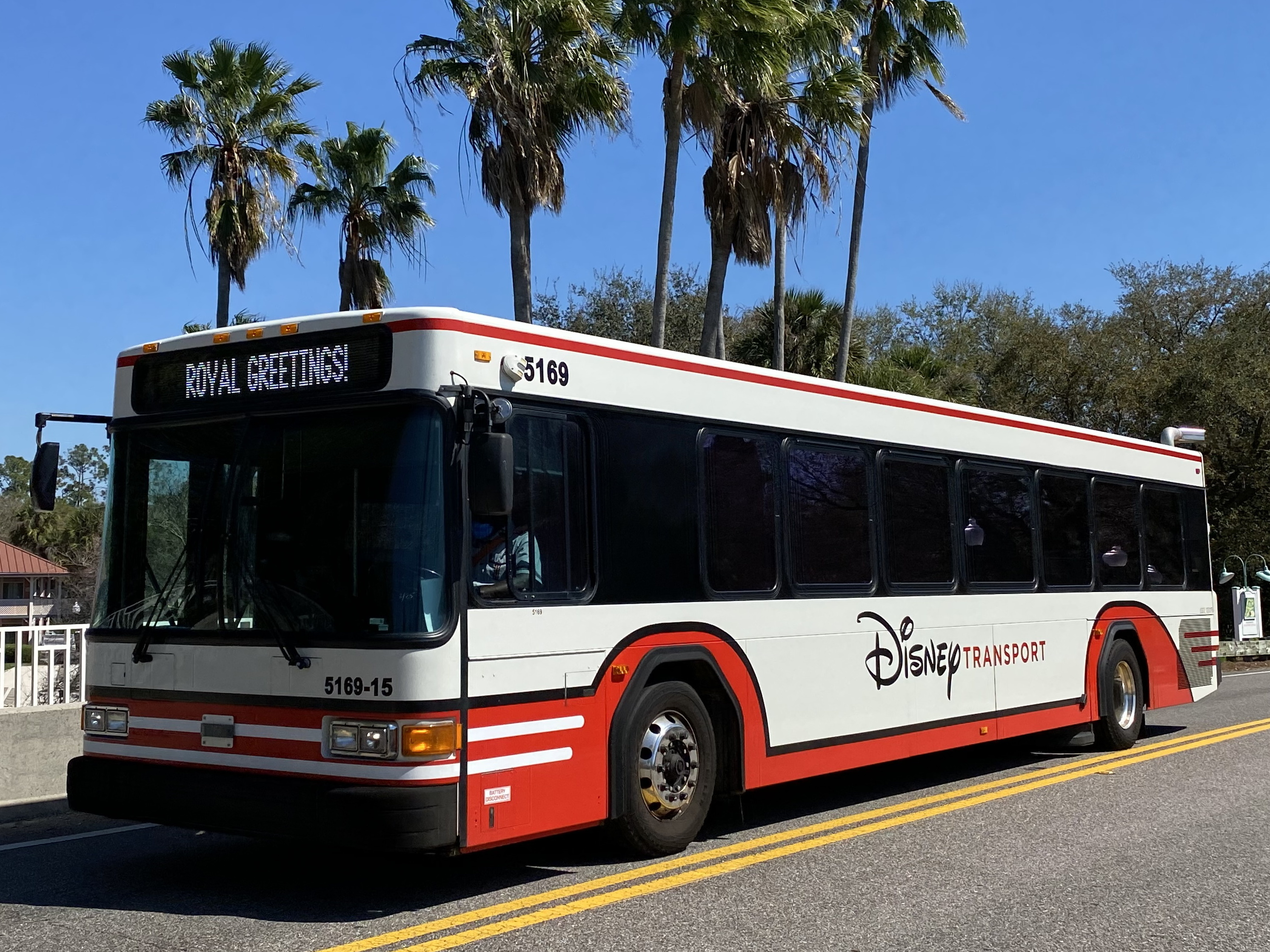
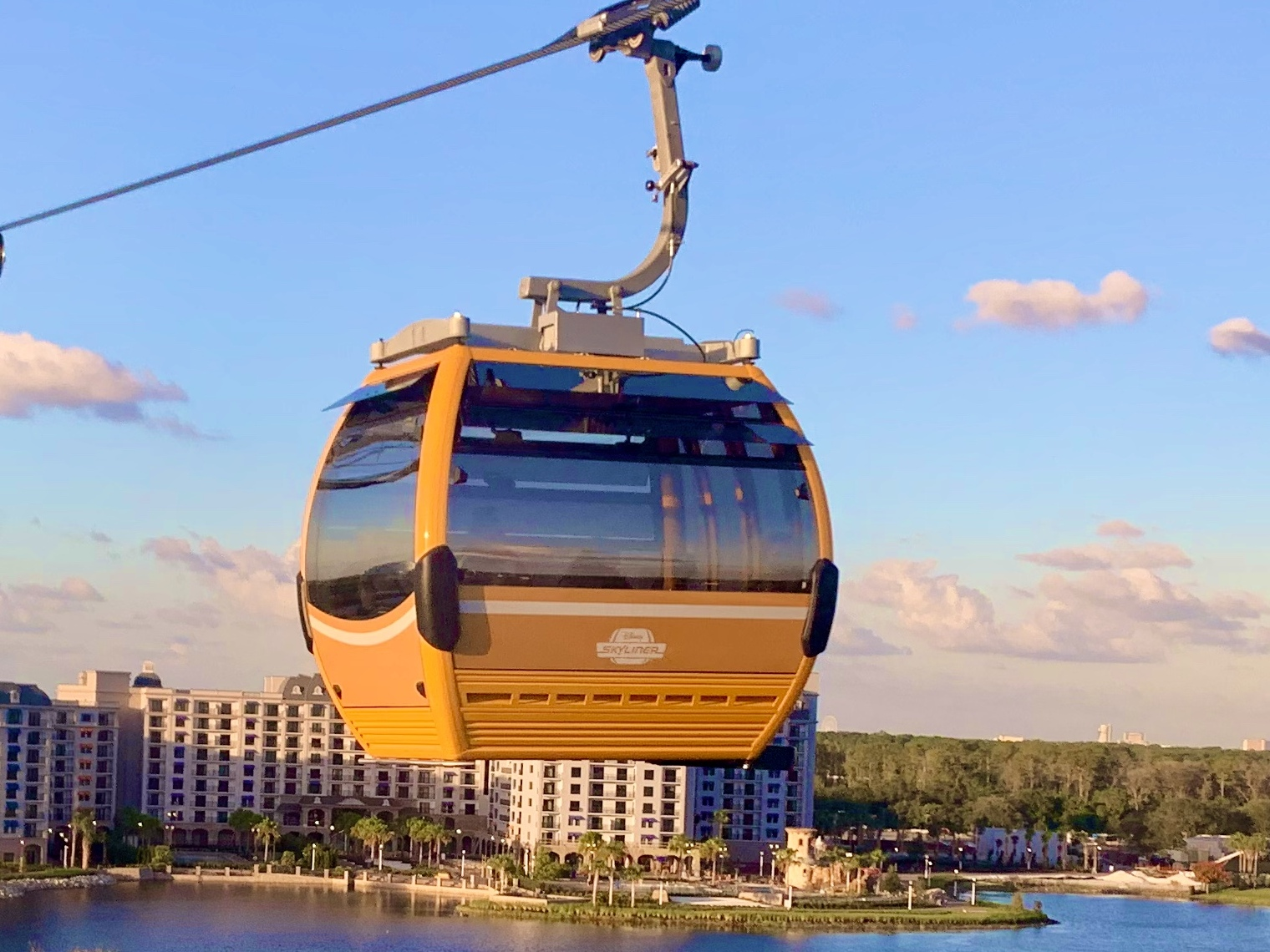
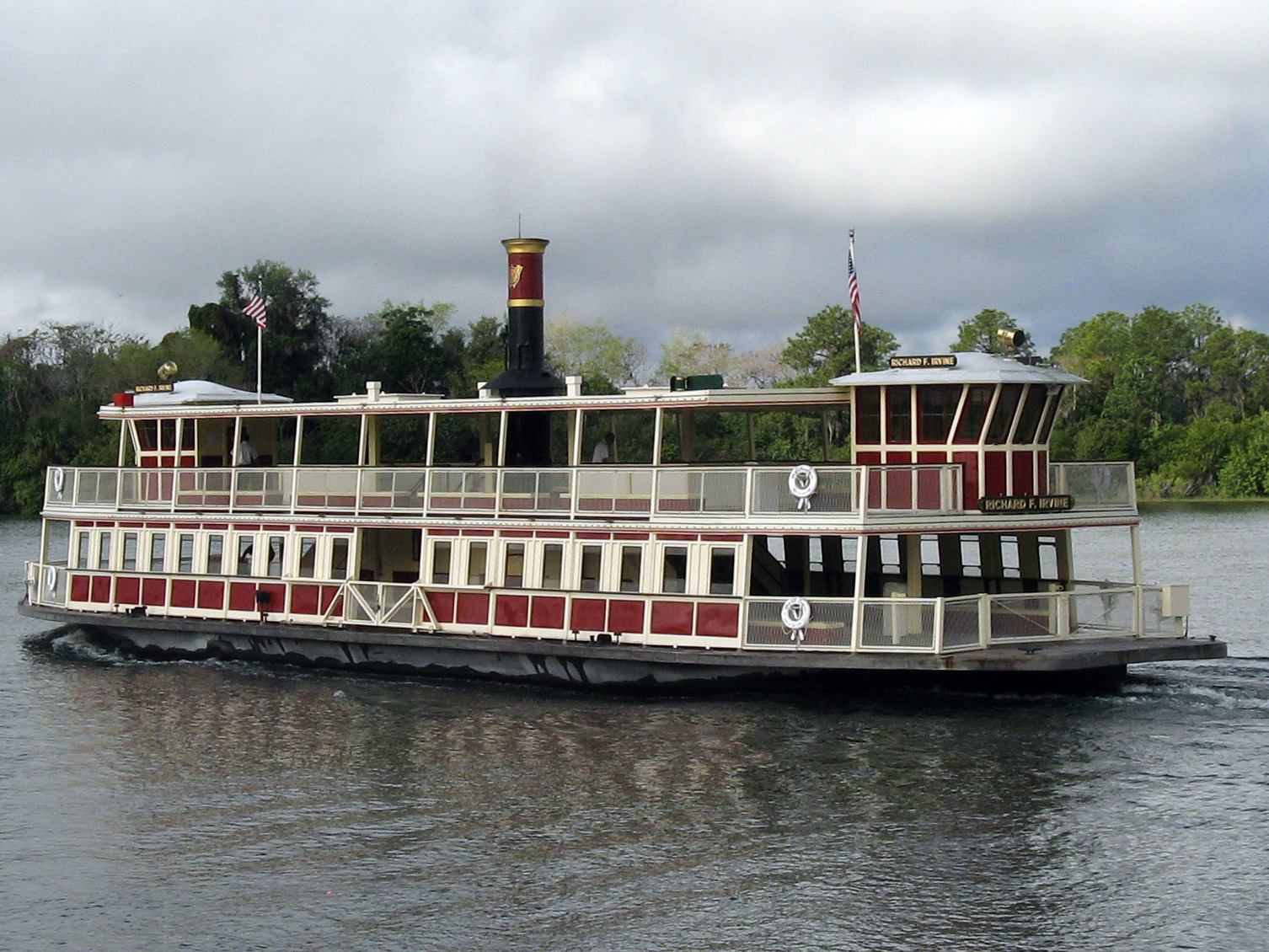
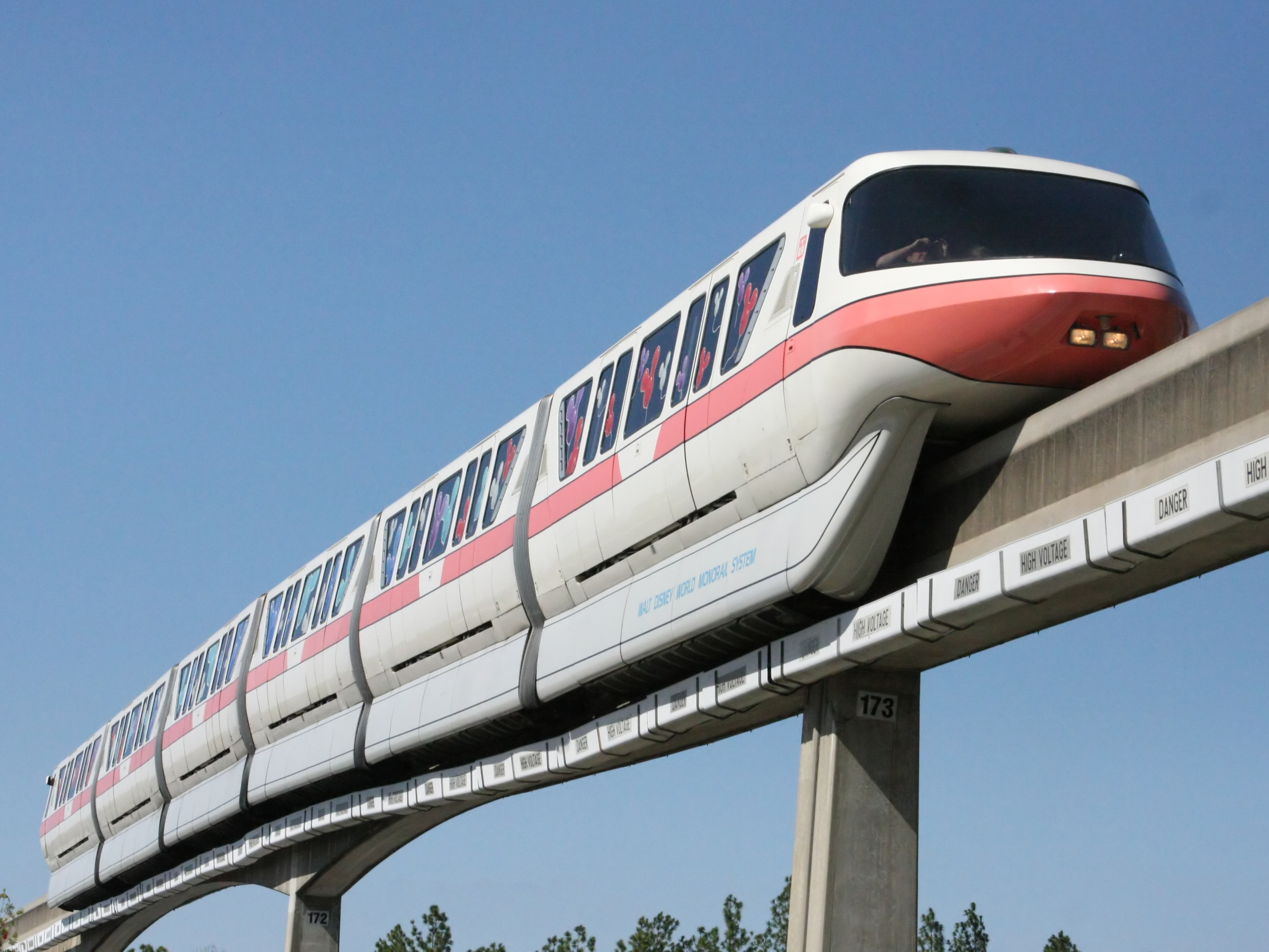
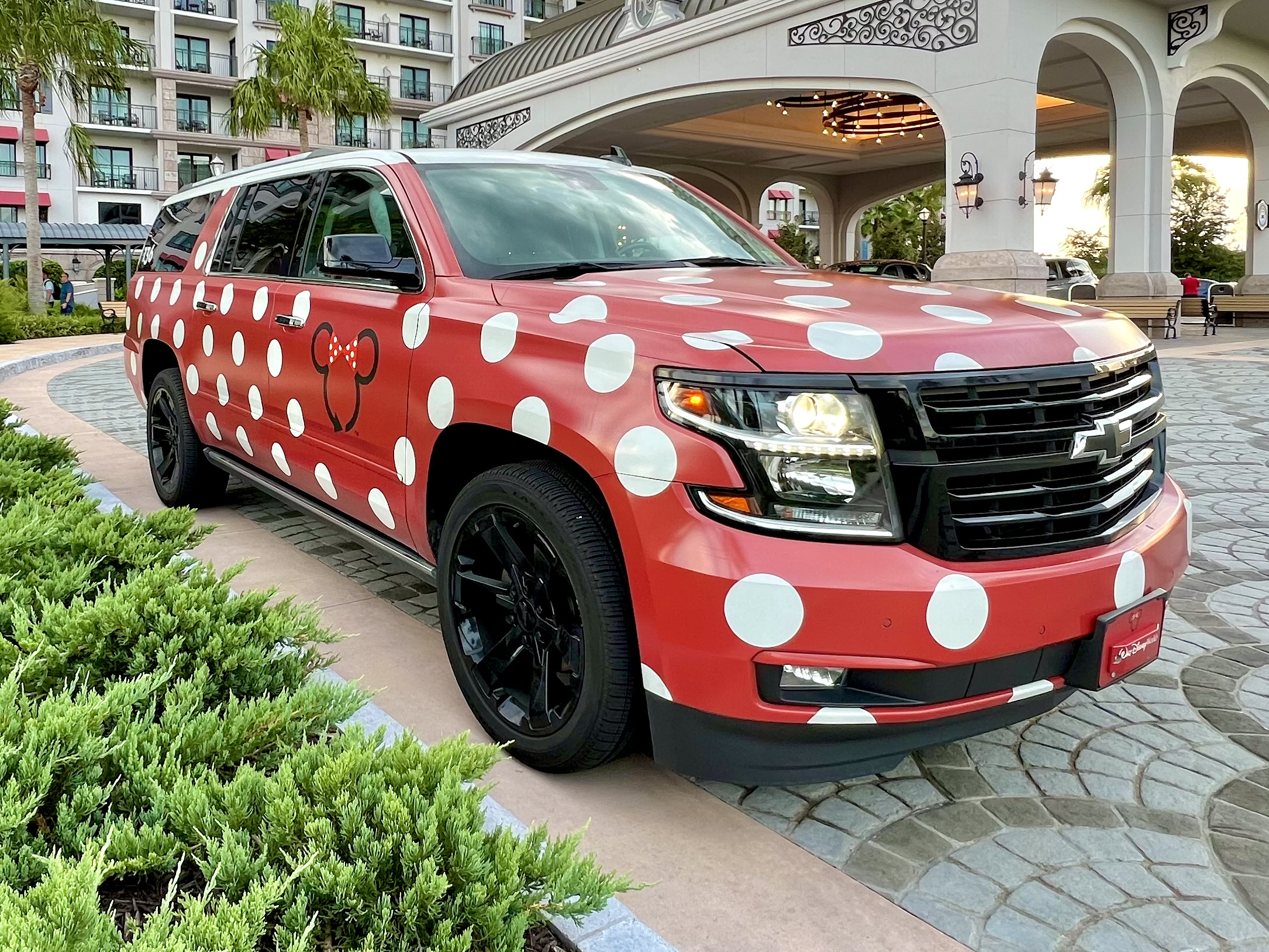
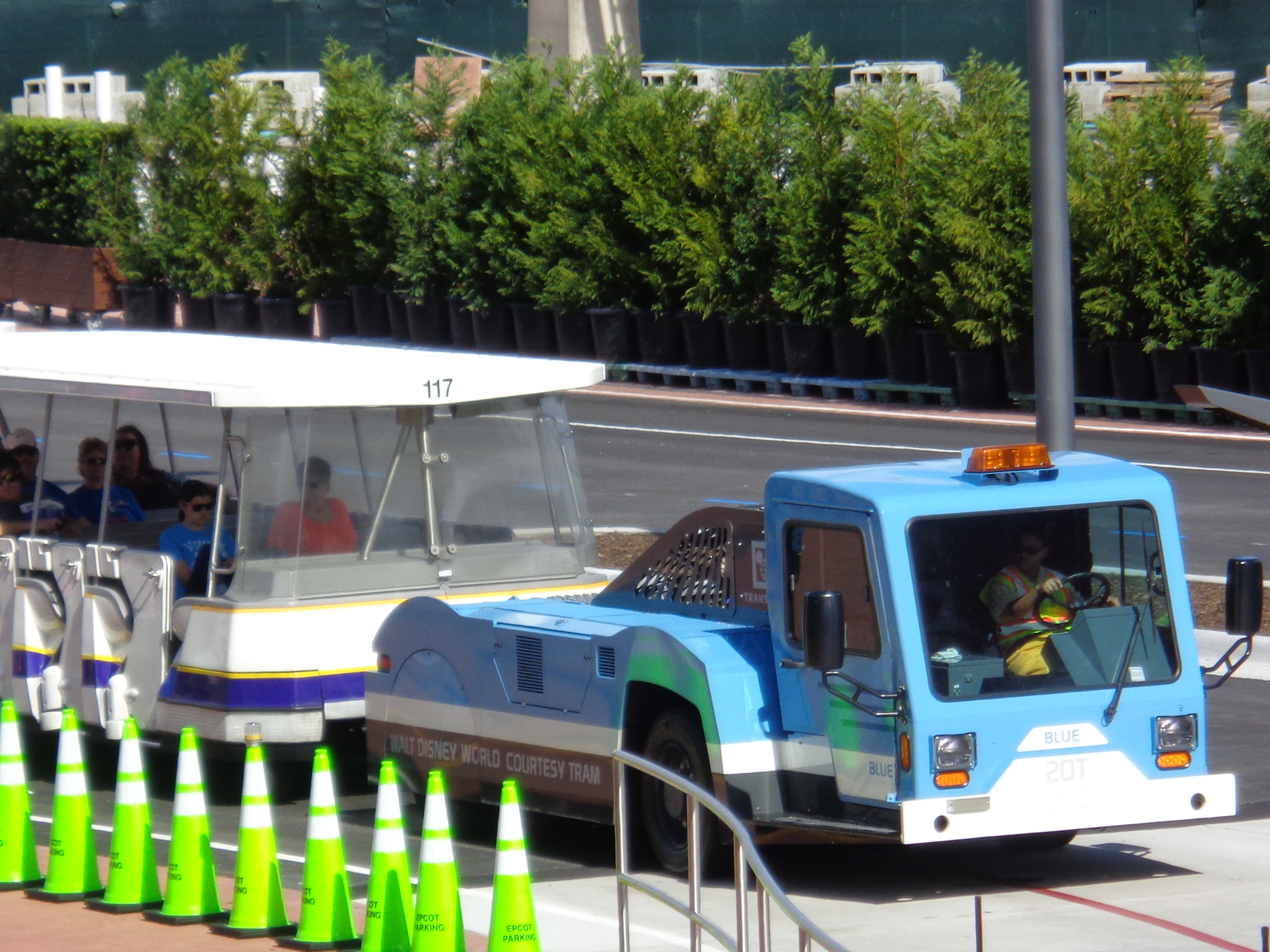
- Six Disney Transport-operated modes of service, clockwise from top left: bus, gondola lift, monorail, parking lot tram, rideshare service, and watercraft.

Overview
- Owner: Disney Experiences
- Area served: Walt Disney World
- Transit type: Bus, gondola lift, monorail, parking lot tram, rideshare service, and watercraft
- Number of stations: 5 hubs, (Note: At Animal Kingdom, Disney Springs, Epcot, Hollywood Studios and Magic Kingdom.) 22 resorts, (Note: There may be more than one stop in each resort; some resorts have their own internal buses.) 4 other locations (Note: Blizzard Beach, ESPN Wide World of Sports Complex, TTC and Typhoon Lagoon.)
- Headquarters: 3020 Maingate Lane; Kissimmee, Florida

Operation
- Began operation: October 1, 1971
- Number of vehicles: 486 buses; 250+ gondolas; 12 monorails; 38 watercraft; 3 ferries; 8 Friendship boats; 6 motor launches; 4 motor cruisers; 15 water taxis; 28 parking lot trams

Disney Transport is the public transit system of the Walt Disney World Resort near Orlando, Florida, United States. It offers guests a variety of fare-free options to navigate the resort, including buses, the Walt Disney World Monorail System, the Disney Skyliner gondola lift system, and watercraft. This network facilitates movement between the resort's four theme parks, its shopping district, and all Disney-owned lodging on the property. Additionally, Disney Transport operates trams, providing assistance navigating large parking lots, and the Minnie Van rideshare service (available for a fee), offering on-demand, point-to-point transportation. Disney Transport is the tenth-busiest transit agency by daily ridership in the United States.

== Buses ==
Direct bus service is provided from every Disney hotel to each theme park and Disney Springs, except where monorail, gondola, or watercraft service is available or walking is practical. Buses also operate between theme parks. This fare-free service is available to all Walt Disney World visitors and typically runs at headways of every 25 minutes or less. Bus service to the parks begins 45 minutes before opening and ends one hour after closing. Transportation between Disney Springs and the resorts is available during operating hours and continues for 90 minutes after closing. Bus stations are located near park entrances, at the Town Center entrance of Disney Springs, and near the main lobbies of all resorts, with additional stops along roadways of more expansive resorts.

=== Routes ===
The bus system operates on a hub-and-spoke model, with most routes running non-stop. The four theme parks and Disney Springs serve as the primary hubs, providing transportation to and from Disney resort hotels, which act as the spokes of the system. Buses also operate directly between theme parks. Additionally, buses provide internal transportation within several larger resort properties. (Note: These resorts are Animal Kingdom Lodge, Caribbean Beach, Coronado Springs, Fort Wilderness, Old Key West, Port Orleans, and Saratoga Springs.)

Direct bus service between resorts is not available unless they share a common route. Similarly, bus service is not provided on routes already covered by the monorail, Skyliner, or watercraft.

Service to the Blizzard Beach and Typhoon Lagoon water parks, as well as the ESPN Wide World of Sports Complex, is more limited. Buses run between Blizzard Beach and the Animal Kingdom hub, and between Typhoon Lagoon and the Disney Springs hub. The sports complex is only served by buses from the Pop Century, Caribbean Beach, and All-Star resorts.

=== Features ===
Each Disney resort features passenger information system that display real-time estimates for the next bus arrival to each destination. This system uses GPS tracking to provide projected wait times, with buses typically arriving at intervals of 20 minutes or less. Onboard, recorded announcements inform passengers about points of interest along the route along with upcoming stops, with GPS technology ensuring the appropriate messages play at the correct locations. All buses are air-conditioned and accessible, equipped to accommodate up to two wheelchairs or mobility scooters per vehicle. Strollers must be folded before boarding.

Between 2014 and May 2016, dedicated bus lanes were installed along Buena Vista Drive between Epcot Center Drive and Disney Springs. These exclusive lanes provide buses traveling to and from Disney Springs and Typhoon Lagoon with a separate right-of-way in the median of Buena Vista Drive, reducing travel times.

=== Fleet ===
Disney Transport operates a fleet of 422 buses, primarily 40-foot-long (12 m) Gillig Low Floor models. The fleet currently is the third largest fleet of any Florida transportation system, behind Miami's Metrobus and the Jacksonville Transportation Authority.

In 2014, Disney experimented with adding 60-foot-long (18 m) articulated buses as a pilot project to increase capacity on certain routes. However, no articulated buses have been purchased since that time. All Disney Transport buses run on R50 renewable diesel fuel.

The system is supported by two bus depots: one near the Magic Kingdom Car Care Center and another on Recycle Way near Animal Kingdom.

Model	Photo	Numbers	Qty	Year
Gillig Low Floor		4956–4962	7	2007
Gillig Low Floor		4963–4983	21	2008
Gillig Low Floor		4985–4999	15	2009
Gillig Low Floor		5010–5022	13	2010
Gillig Low Floor		5023–5069	47	2011
Gillig Low Floor		5071–5121	51	2012
Gillig Low Floor		5122–5145	24	2013
Gillig Low Floor		5158–5199	42	2015
Gillig Low Floor		5200–5206	7	2016
Gillig Low Floor		5207–5212	6	2017
Gillig Low Floor		5213–5288	76	2019
Gillig Low Floor		5289–5379	91	2024
New Flyer Xcelsior XD60		5146–5151	6	2013
Nova Bus LFS		5000–5009	10	2010
Nova Bus LFS Articulated		5152–5157	6	2013

== Disney Skyliner Gondola lift ==
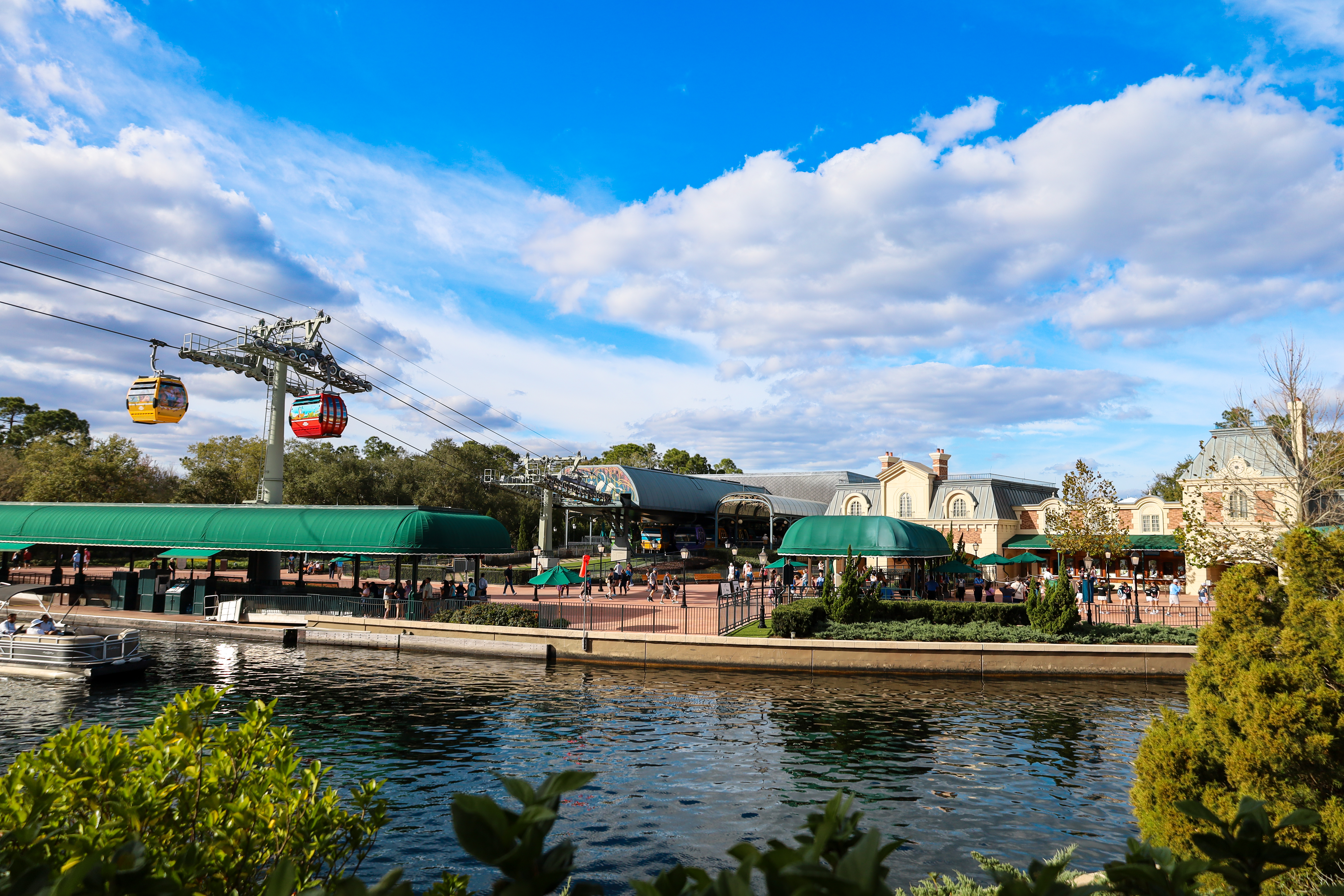
Disney Skyliner station outside Epcot's International Gateway entrance.

Disney Skyliner is a gondola lift system connecting four Disney resort hotels and two theme parks. Opened in 2019, the Skyliner has three lines radiating from a central hub located at the Caribbean Beach Resort. These lines extend to:

- Disney's Hollywood Studios theme park.
- A combined station serving the Art of Animation and Pop Century resorts.
- Epcot, with an intermediate stop at the Riviera Resort.

Each gondola cabin seats up to ten guests and is wheelchair-accessible. The gondolas travel at 11 miles per hour (18 km/h) and do not have air-conditioning systems, although there are windows and floor vents through which air can be circulated. At each station, cabins can be pulled aside, allowing disabled riders to board without delaying the cabins behind them.

== Monorail ==
Complementing the bus network, is the Walt Disney World Monorail System, one of the iconic features of the resort. This fare-free service operates three lines departing from the Transportation and Ticket Center (TTC).

- Magic Kingdom Resort Line: This line circles between the TTC, the Polynesian Village Resort, the Grand Floridian Resort, the Magic Kingdom and the Contemporary Resort.
- Magic Kingdom Express Line: This line provides a direct connection between the TTC and Magic Kingdom, bypassing the resort stops.
- Epcot Line: This line directly connects the TTC and Epcot.

The system utilizes twelve Mark VI monorails. A portable ramp at each station bridges the vertical gap between the platform and the monorail, ensuring accessibility for wheelchair users.

The monorail system debuted in 1971 with the Magic Kingdom Resort and Express lines and expanded in 1982 with the addition of the Epcot line. As of 2013, it remains one of the world's busiest monorail systems, transporting over 150,000 guests daily.

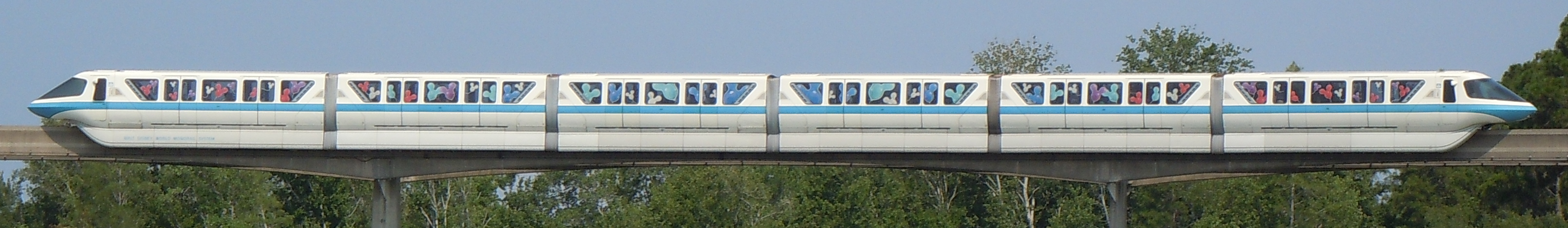
The Monorail Blue train

== Watercraft ==
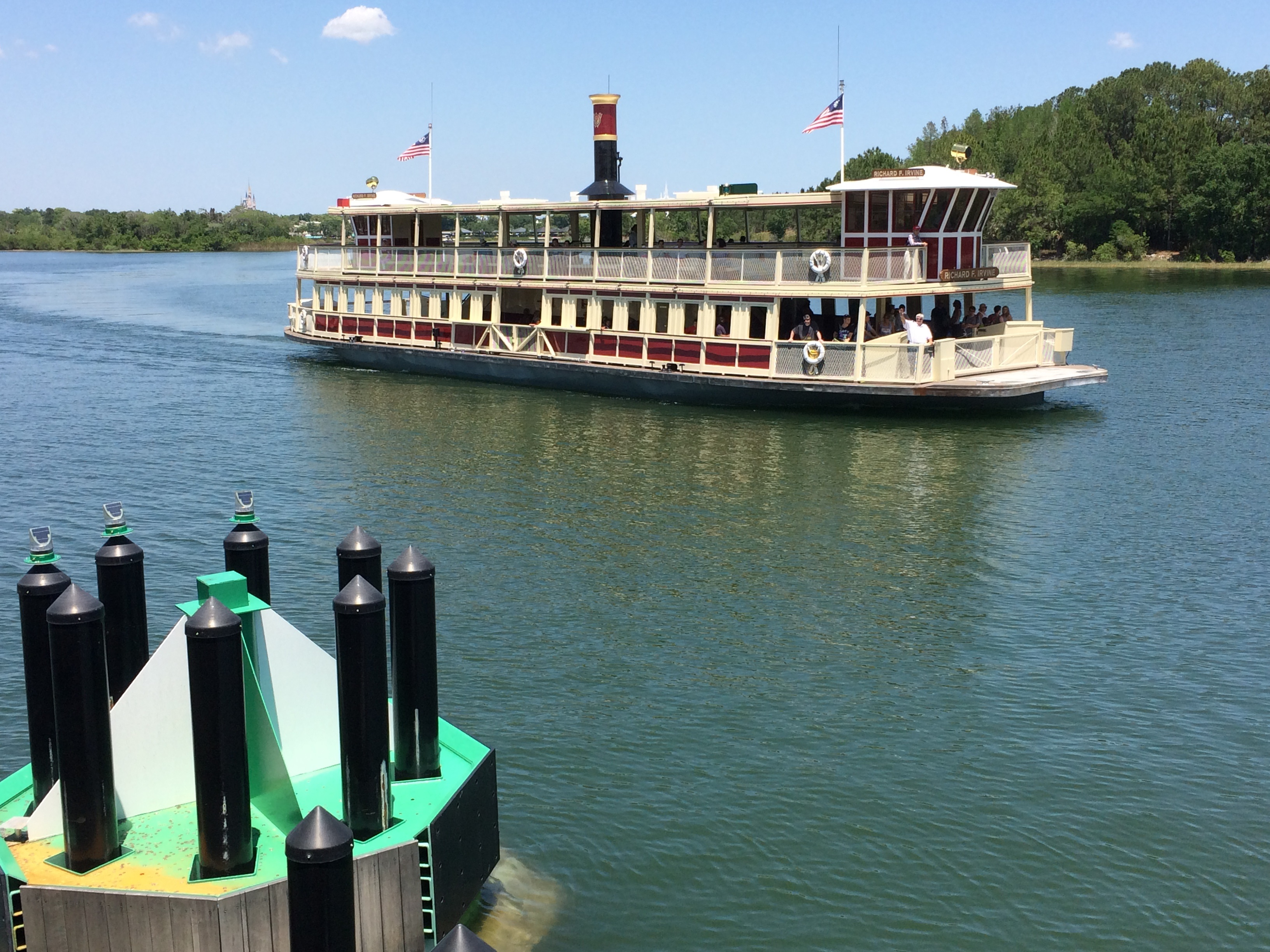
The Richard F. Irvine ferry in the Seven Seas Lagoon

The resort maintains a fleet of watercraft to move guests between various Disney resorts and parks. These ferries are also free to ride. While some routes duplicate bus or monorail routes, the watercraft provide a scenic, albeit slower, way to travel from one location to another.

Strollers can be transported aboard all of the vessels, ferries, motor cruisers, Friendship boats, and River Cruise Ferries are accessible when water conditions are favorable. Motor launches cannot accept motorized or unfolded wheelchairs.

=== Ferries ===
The boats with the highest capacities are the large ferryboats that cross the Seven Seas Lagoon between the Transportation and Ticket Center and the Magic Kingdom. The three ferries are clad in different trim colors and are named for past Disney executives. They are the two twin Magic Kingdom-class ferries, the Richard F. Irvine (red trim) and the Admiral Joe Fowler (blue trim), along with one Kingdom Queen-class ferry, the General Joe Potter (green trim). It was announced in 2026 that a fourth ferryboat, the Meg Gilbert Crofton, will be launched around 2027.

Each ferryboat can carry up to 600 guests and are staffed by three crew members. During park opening and closing, all three ferries operate, if available. During all other times, two ferries operate with wait times between 10 and 20 minutes in most cases. The crossing takes just six minutes, but each trip can take 10–12 minutes with departure and docking.

=== Motor launches/cruisers ===
Motor launches and motor cruisers link the resorts along Bay Lake and the Seven Seas Lagoon, using colored flags to indicate the route. The six motor launches are smaller vessels that are not accessible to people with mobility disabilities and are named Adventurer, Explorer, Mariner, Navigator, Seafarer and Voyager. The four motor cruisers are larger vessels that are accessible and are named Bon Voyage, Castaway's, Mermaid I, and Tradewinds.

The gold flag route connects the Magic Kingdom to the Grand Floridian and Polynesian using one launch and one cruiser. The green flag route links the Magic Kingdom to Fort Wilderness using two cruisers. The red flag route connects the Magic Kingdom to Wilderness Lodge using one launch and one cruiser. The blue flag route provides continuous circular service between the Contemporary, Fort Wilderness and Wilderness Lodge resorts using two launches, and is therefore not accessible to people with mobility disabilities.

=== Sassagoula River Cruise Ferry ===
Sassagoula River Cruise Ferries, which also have colored flags as route indicators, transport passengers from Disney Springs to Disney Springs Resort Area hotels located along the Sassagoula River using a fleet of 15 vessels named Azalea Bloom, Bayou Princess, Blossom Queen, Buena Vista Queen, Crescent City Queen, Delta Lady, Florida Queen, Jazz Lady, Jazz Queen, Louisiana Lady, Magnolia Blossom, Memphis Miss, Saratoga Queen, Sassagoula Sunset, and Southern Breeze.

The green flag route connects Disney Springs with Old Key West, the blue flag route travels between Disney Springs and the Treehouse Villas via Saratoga Springs. The yellow flag route takes people between Disney Springs and Port Orleans–Riverside, while the purple flag route travels between Disney Springs and Port Orleans–French Quarter. At times of lower traffic, the yellow and purple flag routes combine to travel between Disney Springs and Riverside via French Quarter.

=== Friendship boats ===
Friendship boats connect the International Gateway entrance of Epcot to the Hollywood Studios via the Epcot Resort Area hotels: BoardWalk, Beach Club/Yacht Club and Swan/Dolphin. They also connect Epcot's Canada and Germany pavilions in the World Showcase section. The eight vessels are named Friendship I through Friendship VIII.

Type	Photo	Route	North/west terminal	Intermediate stops	South/east terminal
Ferry (3 boats)			Magic Kingdom	None	Transportation and Ticket Center
Motor launch (6 boats) Motor cruiser (4 boats)		Gold (1 launch, 1 cruiser)	Before 3 p.m.: Clockwise operation between Magic Kingdom, Polynesian Village & Grand Floridian. After 3 p.m.: Counterclockwise operation between Magic Kingdom, Grand Floridian & Polynesian Village.		
Motor launch (6 boats) Motor cruiser (4 boats)		Green (2 cruisers)	Magic Kingdom	None	Fort Wilderness
Motor launch (6 boats) Motor cruiser (4 boats)		Red (1 launch, 1 cruiser)	Magic Kingdom	None	Wilderness Lodge
Motor launch (6 boats) Motor cruiser (4 boats)		Blue (2 launches)	Clockwise operation between Contemporary, Fort Wilderness & Wilderness Lodge.		
River Cruise (15 boats)		Yellow/Purple	Port Orleans–Riverside (Yellow)	Port Orleans–French Quarter (Purple)	Disney Springs–Marketplace
River Cruise (15 boats)		Blue	Treehouse Villas	Saratoga Springs	Disney Springs–Marketplace
River Cruise (15 boats)		Green	Old Key West	None	Disney Springs–Marketplace
River Cruise (15 boats)		Red	Disney Springs internal counterclockwise operation between Marketplace, West Side & The Landing.		
Friendship boats (8 boats)			Epcot–International Gateway	BoardWalk; Beach/Yacht Club; Swan/Dolphin	Hollywood Studios
Friendship boats (8 boats)			Epcot–Canada	None	Epcot–Germany

== Parking lot trams ==
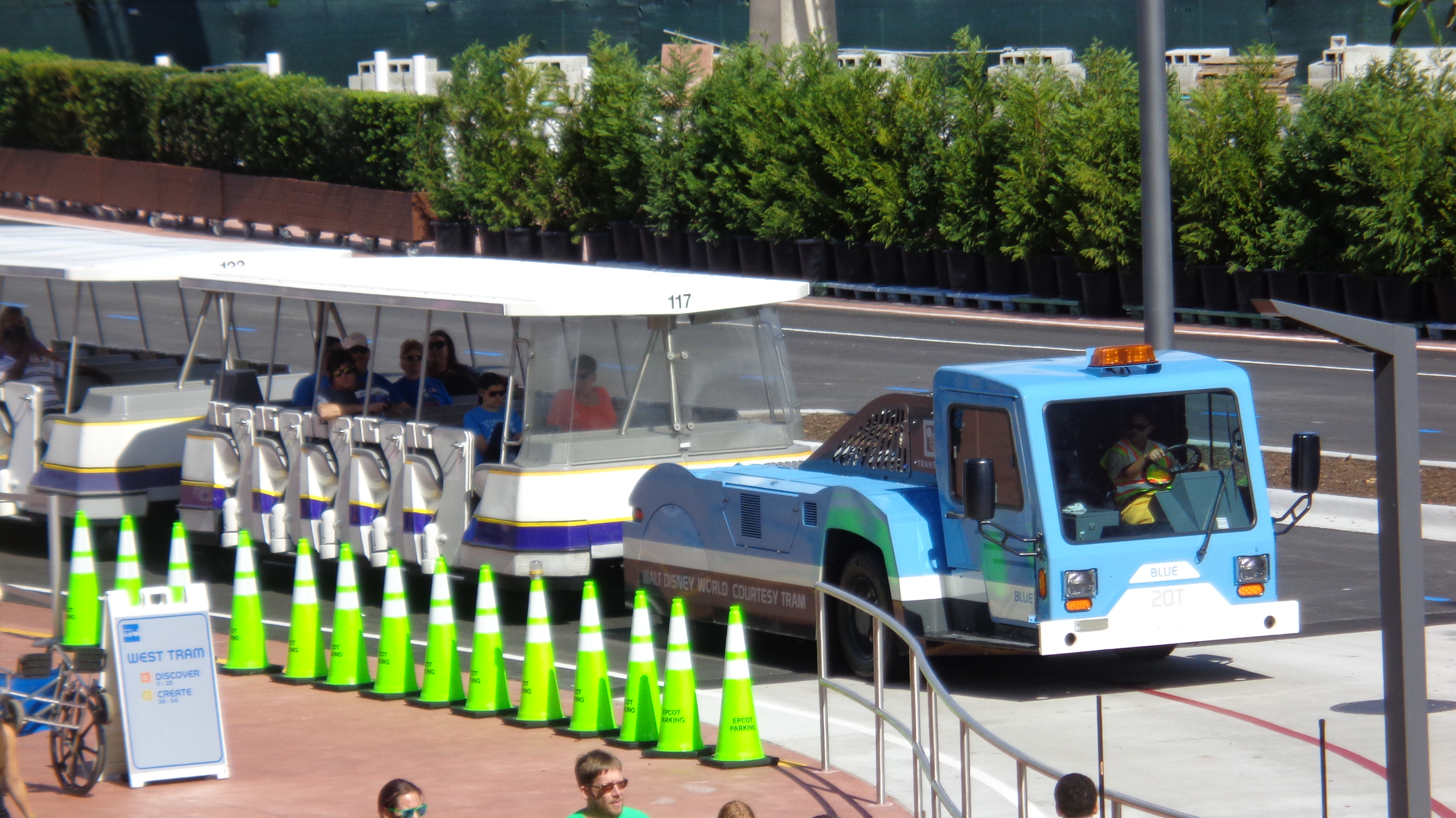
A parking lot tram operating at Epcot

Disney Transport operates a fleet of trams that shuttle guests between parking lots and the main entrances of theme parks (except Magic Kingdom, where trams drop guests off at the Transportation and Ticket Center. The trams provide an alternative to walking, especially for longer distances. The trams are not wheelchair accessible, instead guests with mobility disabilities are directed to park close to the main entrance.

There are six tram lines across the four theme parks:

- Magic Kingdom: Two tram lines serve the parking lot, with trams designated for the "Heroes" and "Villains" sides.
- Epcot: Two tram lines operate within the parking lot, with trams serving the "Earth" and "Space" sections.
- Hollywood Studios & Animal Kingdom: These parks each have a single tram line for their respective parking lots.

The original tram tractors, purchased in 1969, were powered by compressed natural gas (CNG). However, these tractors encountered frequent technical issues, leading to a custom-designed replacement fleet in 1972. These initially ran on CNG as well, but were later converted to diesel fuel due to operational challenges. Over time, technology improved, allowing the trams to be converted back to CNG in the late 1990s and early 2000s.

For enhanced safety, outward-facing speakers and doors were installed on all tram cars in late 2010 and 2011. In the mid-2010s, Disney replaced the entire tractor fleet with a model based on JBT AeroTech's tractors used to move aircraft.

== Minnie Van ==
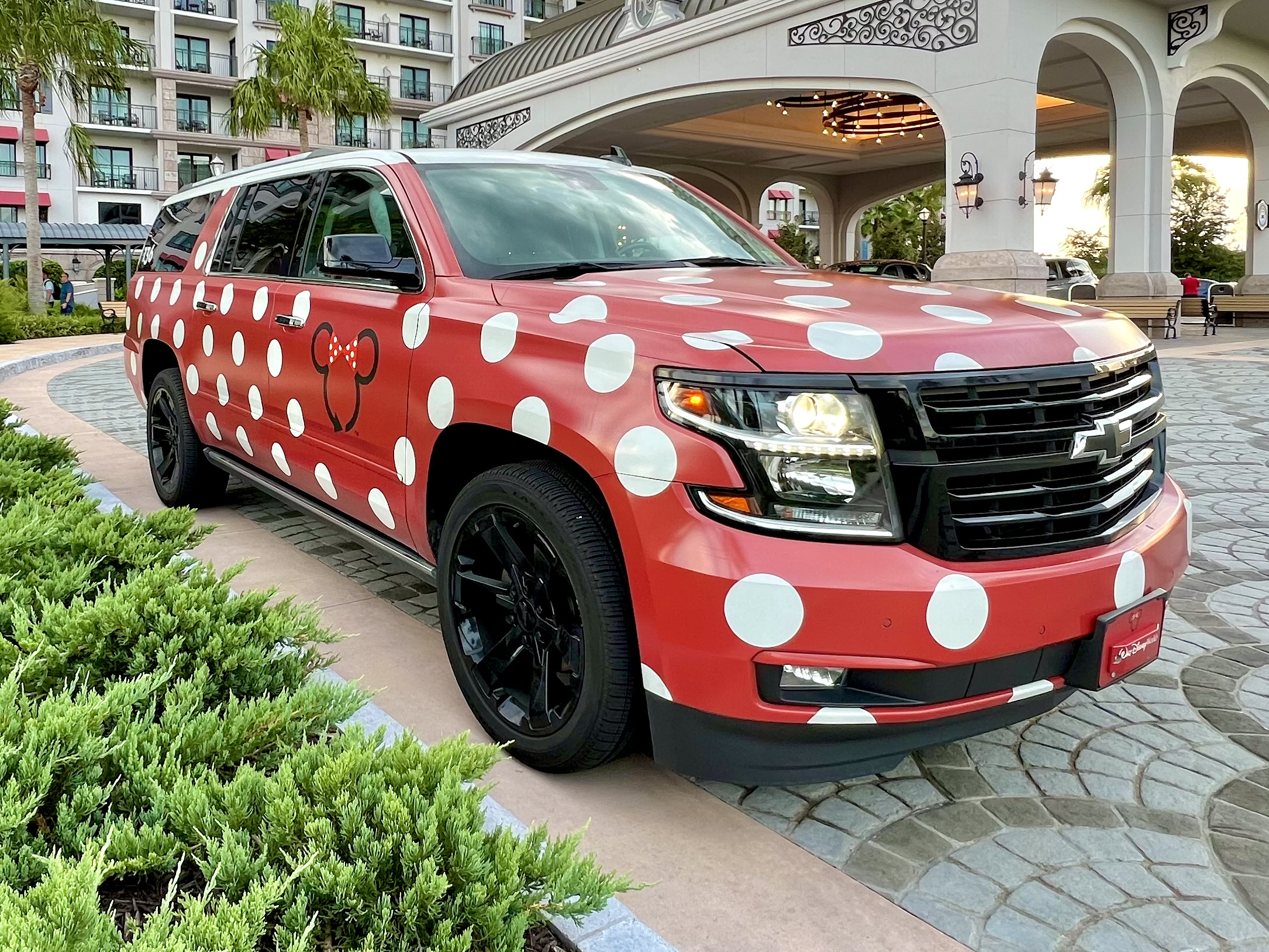
A Minnie Van parked at Disney’s Riviera Resort

Disney Transport operates an on-demand rideshare service called the Minnie Van, launched in 2017. Minnie Vans provide direct, door-to-door transportation within the resort and select nearby areas.

Guests can choose between standard SUVs, which seat up to six passengers and include with child safety seats, or accessible vans, which accommodate four passengers with space for two wheelchairs or other mobility devices.

Minnie Vans are booked through the Lyft mobile app but are operated by Disney Transport employees. The service uses a distance-based pricing model and offers a more private and personalized travel experience compared to Disney's complimentary transportation options. Additionally, Minnie Van riders enjoy the benefit of being dropped close to theme park entrances.

== Discontinued services ==
The resort previously hosted the small Walt Disney World Airport, also called the Lake Buena Vista STOLport. During the early 1970s, scheduled passenger service was operated by Shawnee Airlines with de Havilland Canada DHC-6 Twin Otter turboprops, which had STOL (short takeoff and landing) capabilities on flights to Tampa and Orlando. The airport is no longer in operation, but the landing strip still exists and is currently used as space for offices and storage.

From late 1973 to early 1980, the Fort Wilderness Railroad provided transportation within the Fort Wilderness Resort using steam locomotives. Ties from the 2 ft 6 in (762 mm) narrow-gauge line remain in place along certain sections of the railroad's former right-of-way.

Watercraft provided service to the Discovery Island zoological attraction from its opening in 1974 to its closure in 1999.

== Incidents ==
From September 25, 2013, to September 25, 2015, Disney Transport has been involved in 27 total accidents that have been reported to the Federal Motor Carrier Safety Administration, including two fatal accidents and nineteen others involving injuries.

== See also ==
- Incidents on Disney Transport
- Rail transport in Walt Disney Parks and Resorts
