= Disney's Venetian Resort =

Cancelled hotel planned for Walt Disney World

Coordinates: 28°24′38″N 81°34′45″W

Post card of the never-built Venetian Resort

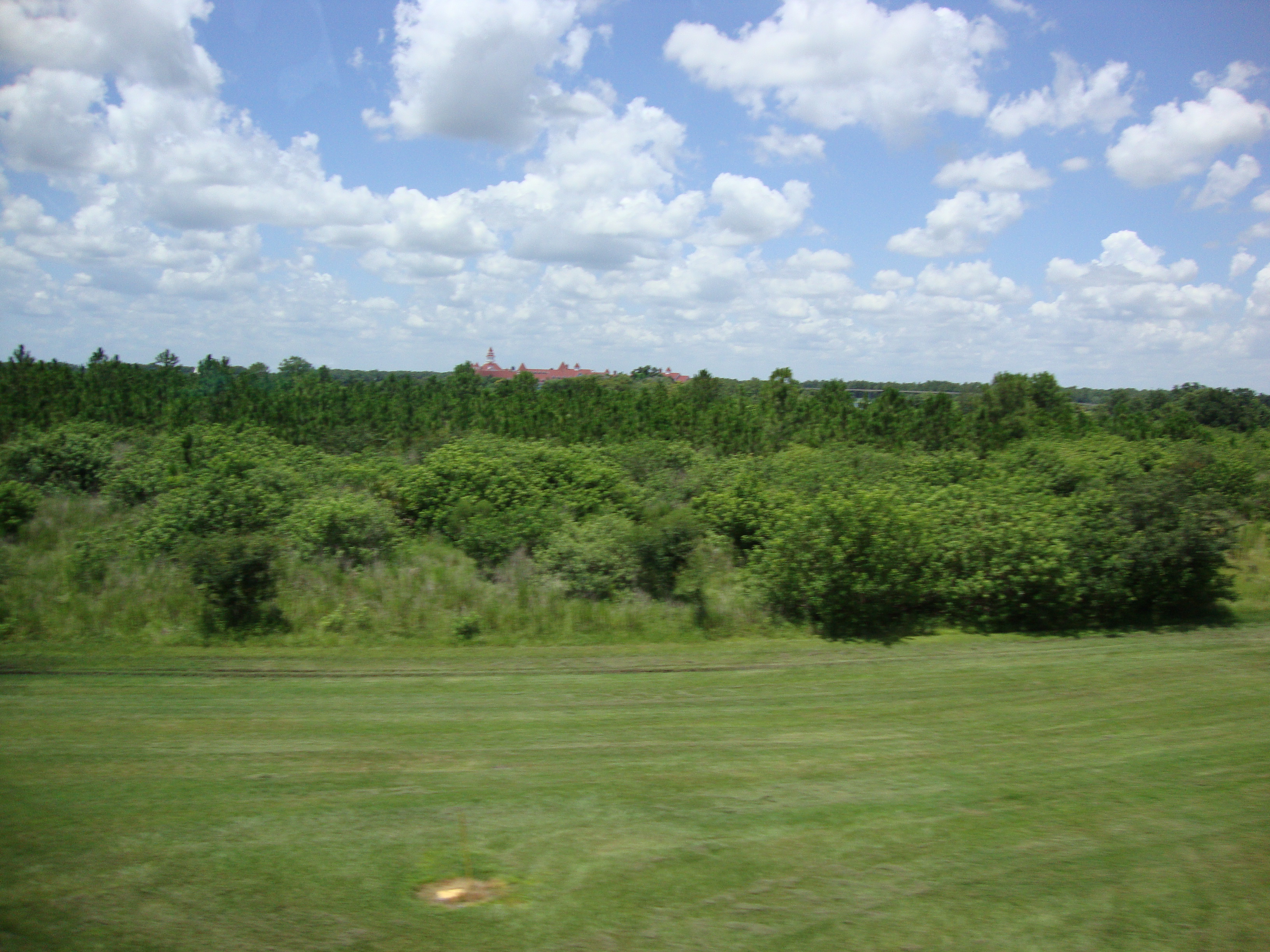
The proposed site for Disney's Venetian Resort.

Disney's Venetian Resort was to be a Disney-owned resort at Walt Disney World in Bay Lake, Florida, that originally would have begun operation on October 1, 1971. It was going to be themed after Venice, Italy, located on Seven Seas Lagoon. Due to the 1973 Oil Embargo, the resort, along with Disney's Asian Resort and Disney's Persian Resort, were never built. In the late 1980s to early 1990s, Michael Eisner saw how well Disney's Grand Floridian Resort was doing and wanted an even better resort. The idea for the Venetian was scrapped in favor of Disney's Mediterranean Resort, which was also not built.

The resort would have been located between the Transportation and Ticket Center and Disney's Contemporary Resort near the water bridge. It was planned to be a 500-room resort. The resort would include canals, with gondolas providing transport.

Plans for a Venetian-themed resort on the site were revisited in 1999. The project, named Disney's Grande Venezia Resort, was designed by Walt Disney Imagineering in conjunction with architectural firm Wimberly, Allison, Tong & Goo, the same firm that helped design the Grand Floridian. Like the Mediterranean Resort, the hotel was to rival the Grand Floridian to be the most luxurious of all the resorts. Concept blueprints called for intricately designed buildings with terra cotta roofs, canals with functioning gondolas, lighted fountains, a masquerade-themed pool, a conference center, and a wedding chapel.

== Resort facts ==
- Category: Deluxe
- Theme: Venice, Italy
- Location: Magic Kingdom Resort Area
- Original Opening Date: October 1971 (never built)

== See also ==
- Disney's Mediterranean Resort
