= Disney's Mediterranean Resort =

Cancelled hotel project in Florida, US

Coordinates: 28°24′38″N 81°34′45″W

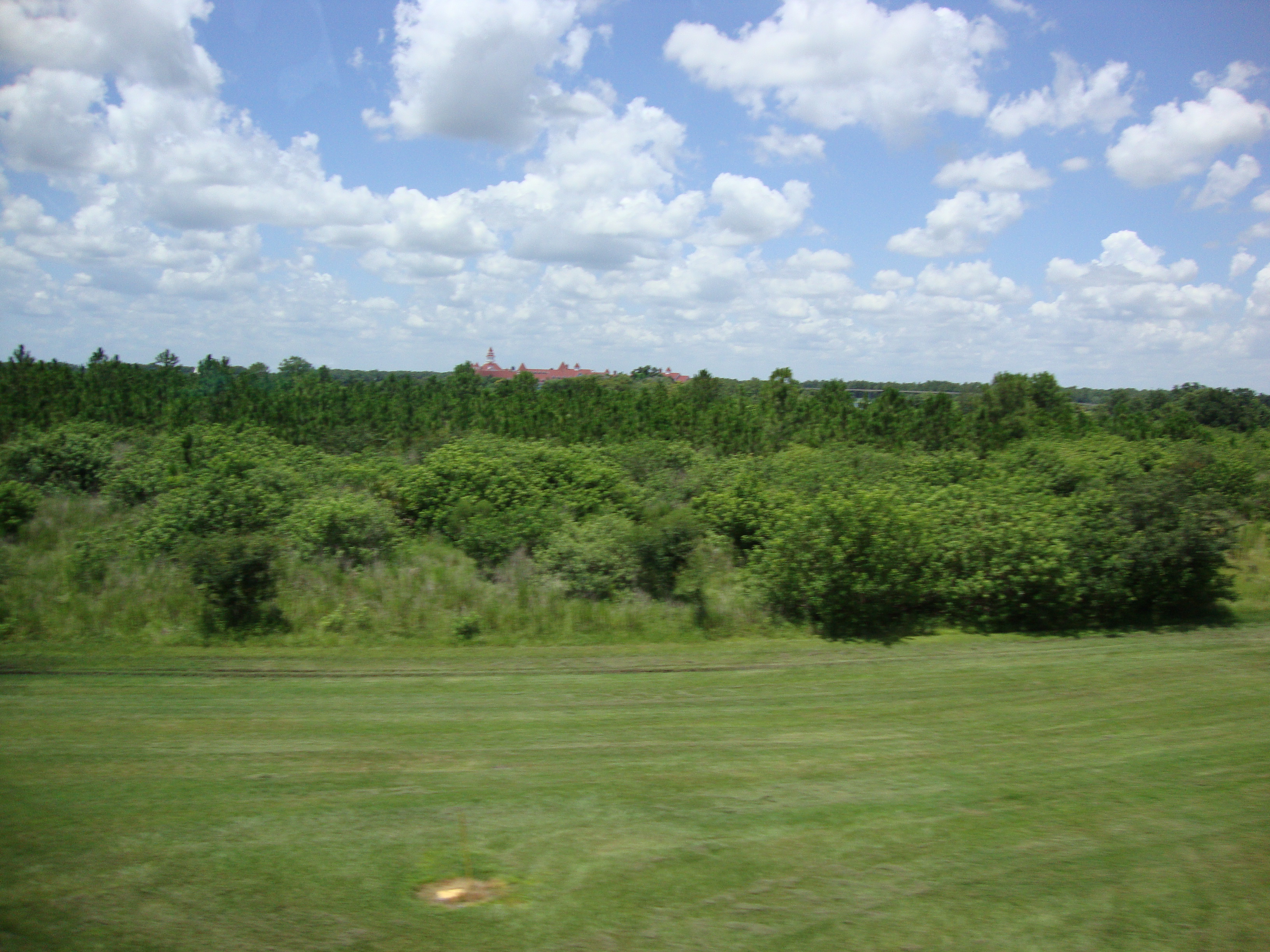
The proposed site for Disney's Mediterranean Resort.

Disney's Mediterranean Resort was a proposed Deluxe resort to be located at the Walt Disney World Resort in Bay Lake, Florida that originally would have begun operation in the 1990s. It was going to be themed after a small Greek island and be located on Seven Seas Lagoon. Land was cleared for the building, but due to very swampy and poor ground samples, the resort was never able to be built. The resort was to be a 5 star resort rivaling Disney's Grand Floridian Resort & Spa, also located on the lagoon.

The resort would have been located between the Transportation and Ticket Center and Disney's Contemporary Resort near the aqueduct. It was originally intended that an earlier un-built resort, Disney's Venetian Resort, would have opened on the same site in 1974. However, due to WED Enterprises establishing a Florida onsite office in that year, subsequent designs were later weeded out in 1981 and WED Designers opted on the Mediterranean theme (with WED Intern Program Architectural input), that was then chosen by WED Enterprises designers in their Glendale CA offices.

On April 28, 2010, it was discovered that a portion of the land where the Mediterranean Resort was to have been constructed was cleared once again. The land was cleared for the purpose of improving lines of sight for the Walt Disney World Monorail System.

Blueprints and models for this resort can be found in the Antoine Predock archives at the University of New Mexico's Center for Southwest Research.

== Resort facts ==
- Category: Deluxe
- Theme: Mediterranean / Greek
- Location: Magic Kingdom Resort Area
- Original Opening Date: 1990s (never built)

== See also ==
- Disney's Venetian Resort
