= Disney's Asian Resort =

Cancelled hotel at Walt Disney World

Coordinates: 28°24′43″N 81°35′11″W

General information
- Type: Resort
- Location: Magic Kingdom Resort Area
- Opened: 1974 (planned)
- Operator: Walt Disney Parks and Resorts (The Walt Disney Company)

Other information
- Number of rooms: 500–600

Disney's Asian Resort was a planned resort to be located at the Walt Disney World Resort in Bay Lake, Florida. Its concept was developed in the 1960s and was expected to open in 1974, three years after its parent complex began operations. However, the 1973 oil crisis led to the cancellation of the project, in addition to Disney's Venetian Resort and Disney's Persian Resort.

== Theme ==
Inspired by the culture of Thailand, the hotel would have featured Thai furnishings and cuisine. Architectural plans featured a large center building more than 160 feet tall with a restaurant on top comparable to the design of Disney's Contemporary Resort. Guest rooms would have been arranged in a square around the perimeter on three sides leaving the side opposite the Seven Seas Lagoon open. The original plan called for 600 rooms but was scaled down to 500 in later revisions. Two-thirds of the guest rooms would have had garden or lake views. Fifty suites would have been deluxe rooms themed after Thai royalty.

== Planning and construction ==
During construction of the man-made Seven Seas Lagoon in the late 1960s, an empty, square-shaped plot of land was set aside near the lagoon's northwestern shore for the future Asian Resort, which had been advertised in Walt Disney World literature before the property opened in 1971. An access road named Asian Way was created to support the site. It was later renamed Floridian Way when it was announced that the Grand Floridan Resort and Spa was to be built on the site.

Construction of the hotel was scheduled to start in 1974 with rooms opening by the end of the year. Disney's 1972 annual report stated that architectural designs were soon starting. Several models were built and land surveys were conducted.

However, the hotel was never built due to the energy crisis bringing a downturn in tourism, which meant that Walt Disney World didn't need as many rooms, and the land stayed empty until Disney's Grand Floridian Resort & Spa opened on the site in 1988. Since the Grand Floridian began operation, plans for an Asian-themed hotel at Walt Disney World Resort appear to have been shelved permanently.
