= Disney's Persian Resort =

Cancelled Walt Disney World hotel

Coordinates: 28°25′20″N 81°34′24″W

Postcard of the never-built Disney's Persian Resort

Disney's Persian Resort was a themed hotel planned for Walt Disney World Resort in Bay Lake, Florida. Due to the 1973 oil crisis, the project was cancelled, along with Disney's Venetian Resort and Disney's Asian Resort. Forms from 1978 showed that the Shah of Iran, Mohammad Reza Shah Pahlavi offered to fund the project's construction and operation but after the Iranian Revolution the project was permanently shelved. The resort was to be located on the shores of Bay Lake, not the Seven Seas Lagoon like the rest of the resorts. The early drawings would have had a monorail spur going to it and through Tomorrowland in Magic Kingdom.

== Theme ==
The resort would have been laid out in a circle with a central building. It would have had a 24-foot dome on the main building which would have housed the entrance area and meeting facilities. The main colors would have been white and blue.

== Facts ==
- Category: Deluxe
- Theme: Iran
- Location: West side of Bay Lake (never built)
