= OKW (disambiguation) =

OKW is the Oberkommando der Wehrmacht, the high command of Nazi German armed forces.

OKW may also refer to:

- "Old King William's", a label given to former school pupils, staff and governors of King William's College, Isle of Man
- Old Key West, a Disney resort in Florida, US
- One Kill Wonder, a 2003 album by the death/thrash-metal group The Haunted
