= Disney Institute =

Development and external training unit of The Walt Disney Company

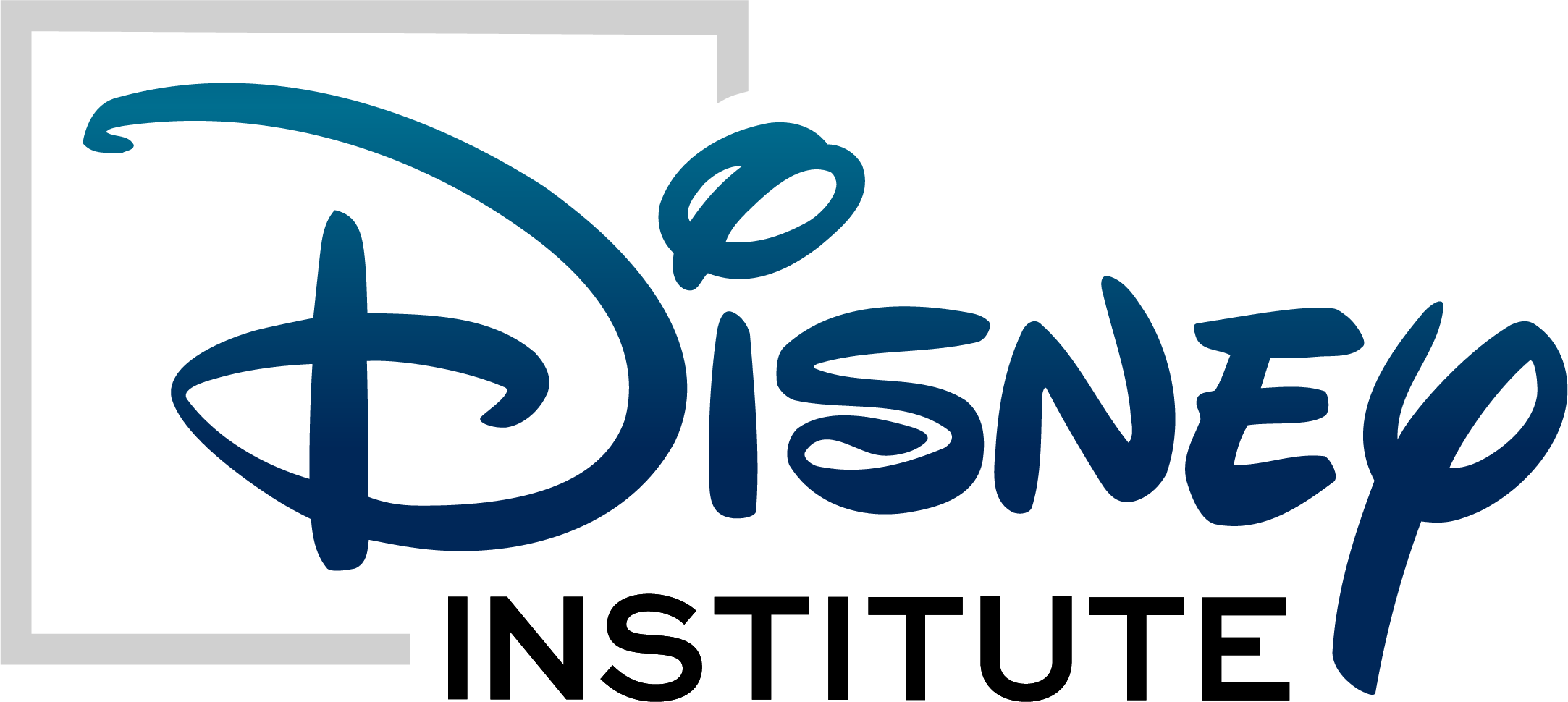
- Industry: Professional development and external training
- Founded: February 1996; 30 years ago in Lake Buena Vista, Florida, United States
- Founder: Michael Eisner
- Owner: The Walt Disney Company
- Website: www.disneyinstitute.com

Disney Institute is the professional development and external training arm of The Walt Disney Company. The company presents 'the business behind the magic' through seminars, workshops and presentations, as well as programs for professionals from many different industries, including healthcare, aerospace/aviation, professional sports, government/military, food/beverage and retail.

The Disney Institute was formerly a resort and learning center opened in February 1996 by Michael Eisner. The resort, which was partly based on the Chautauqua Institution in New York, was envisioned as a new direction in vacationing; one that was more about hands-on learning, personal development and interactivity rather than the more passive, entertainment-based experience traditionally offered in Disney's theme parks. The institute's original curriculum was pared down over the years due to lackluster attendance. Its main public campus closed in 2003 to become Disney's Saratoga Springs Resort & Spa. The program including accommodations and some meals started at $3,700. At the time of the resort's closing, Disney Institute instructors compiled their customer service courses into a book titled Be Our Guest, Perfecting the art of customer service.

== As The Disney Institute Resort ==
Early on the Disney Institute hosted 40 different programs with 3-day to a week long stay ranging in price from $429 to $1,310. The Conference Center, as well as other common buildings, were renovated and absorbed into the institute. Institute buildings included 28 program studios, a 225-seat performance center, a 1,150-seat outdoor amphitheater, a 400-seat cinema, a closed-circuit TV station (DITV), a radio station (WALT) and a sports and fitness center with a full service spa. The resort had a restaurant called "Seasons" and featured a themed dinner menu that rotated nightly.

Guests had to choose to participate in an array of over 80 programs. These programs were under categories such as Animation, Culinary, Gardening, The Great Outdoors, Photography, Television and Youth.

In 2000, Disney changed the focus of the institute from a family-oriented program, to a multi-day seminar for business professionals to learn the "secrets" behind Disney's customer service and business culture. However, this concept did not last, and the resort was closed down in 2003 to make way for the Disney Vacation Club resort, Disney's Saratoga Springs Resort & Spa. Most of the Villas were torn down, except for the Treehouse Villas, which were renovated and reopened. The former Institute program studios and spa building were renovated as the clubhouse of the Saratoga Springs Resort.

== Disney Institute Today: Professional Development ==
Disney Institute is a professional development organization within The Walt Disney Company that delivers training in leadership, customer experience, creativity in business, and employee engagement at Walt Disney World (Florida) and Disneyland Resort (California).

Programs are offered in both one‑day and multi‑day formats and combine facilitated discussion with practical observations inside the parks to examine operations and service design in real time. Sessions are led by facilitators with Disney operational backgrounds and emphasize discussion, activities, and practical “adapt and apply” work rather than lecture‑only delivery.

Locations.

Classes are delivered from dedicated learning spaces at Disney’s Contemporary Resort at Walt Disney World, with an additional space at the Pixar Place Hotel at Disneyland Resort; field components occur in the adjacent parks.

Course topics.

Regular offerings include Disney’s Approach to Leadership Excellence, Disney’s Approach to Quality Service, Disney’s Approach to Creativity in Business, and Disney’s Approach to Employee Engagement, all in both single‑day and multi‑day formats. These 1‑ and 3‑day deep‑dive classes are available at both Walt Disney World and Disneyland Resort.

Audience and industry reach.

On-site courses are available for public registration and participation commonly includes professionals across sectors such as healthcare, retail, transportation, technology, finance, and education, with content structured so attendees can map practices to their own organizations.
