= Disney's Saratoga Springs Resort & Spa =

Unit of the Walt Disney World Resort

Coordinates: 28.376712°N 81.520194°W

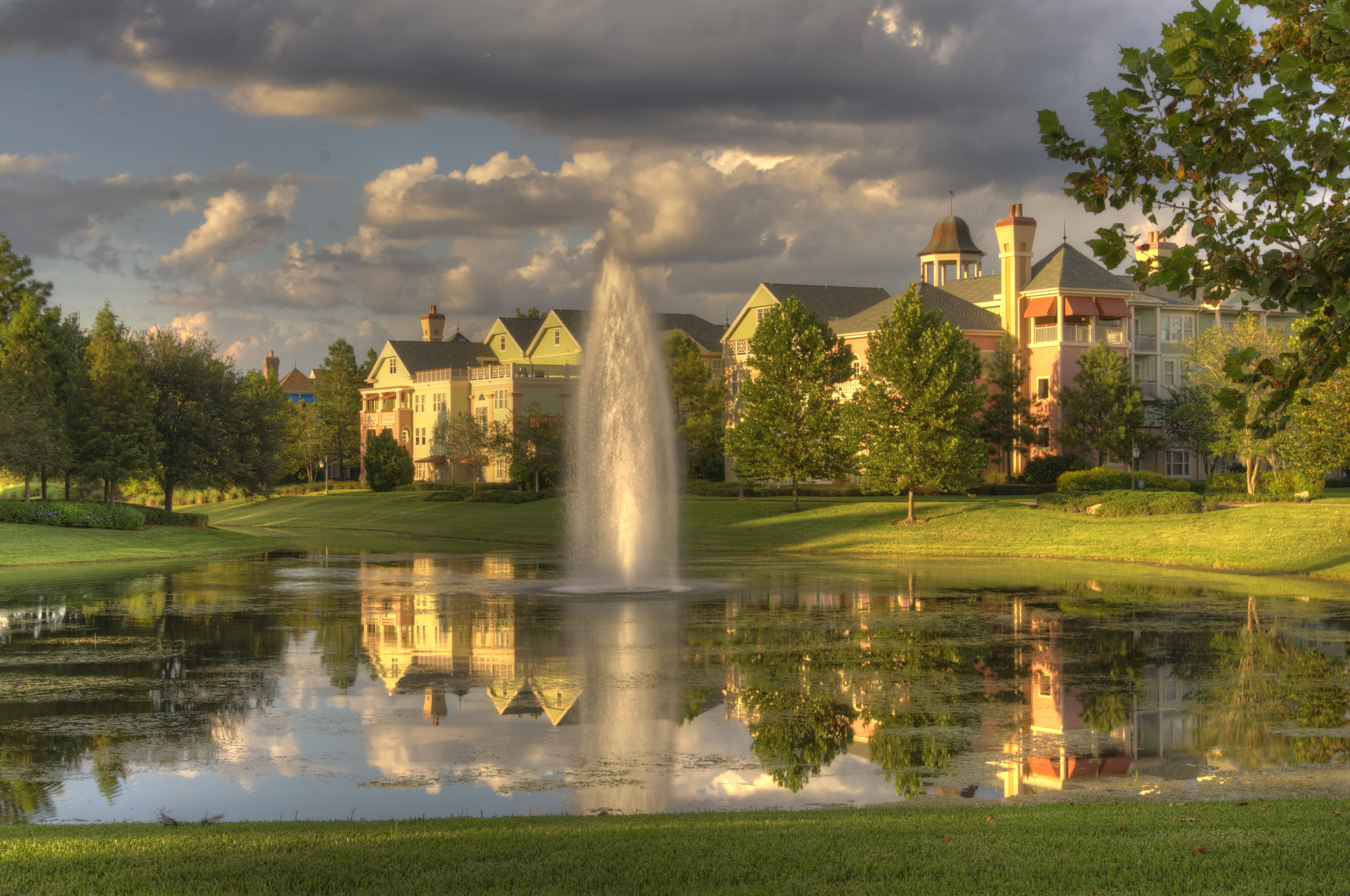
- Interactive map of the Disney's Saratoga Springs Resort & Spa area

General information
- Type: Resort
- Location: Disney Springs Resort Area
- Opened: May 17, 2004

Other information
- Number of suites: Grand Villa, Treehouse Villa

Disney's Saratoga Springs Resort & Spa is a Disney Vacation Club (DVC) resort at the Walt Disney World Resort in Lake Buena Vista, Florida. The resort is the seventh Disney Vacation Club resort and is situated on the former site of the Disney Institute. It first opened on May 17, 2004 and was built in three phases. It is now the largest Disney Vacation Club resort. The resort was inspired by the city of Saratoga Springs, New York.

The 65-acre (26 ha) resort was designed by Graham Gund Architects of Cambridge, Massachusetts. There are a total of 18 Villa Buildings with 828 Vacation Home Units (1,260 guest rooms), plus an additional 60 Treehouse Villas.

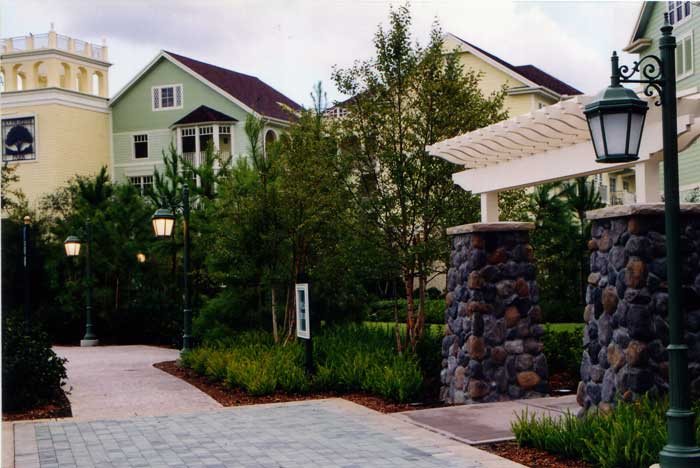
A view of Congress Park, the first phase of Disney's Saratoga Springs Resort & Spa which opened in May 2004.

== History ==
The resort opened in 4 phases:

- Phase 1: Four Villa Buildings in one section called Congress Park opened with 184 Vacation Home units (280 guest rooms) on May 17, 2004.
- Phase 2: Eight Villa Buildings in two sections called The Springs and The Paddock started opening in Spring 2005 eventually adding 368 Vacation Home Units (560 guest rooms).
- Phase 3: Six Villa Buildings in two sections called The Carousel and The Grandstand completed this phase of the large resort in Summer 2007, adding 276 Vacation Home Units (420 guest rooms).
- Phase 4: Treehouse Villas built in natural forest glens with 60 three-bedroom homes opened on June 1, 2009. These stand-alone structures—elevated 10 feet off the ground on pedestals and beams—are located along the Sassagoula River.
