= Disney's Old Key West Resort =

Original Disney Vacation Club resort

Coordinates: 28.373583°N 81.534111°W

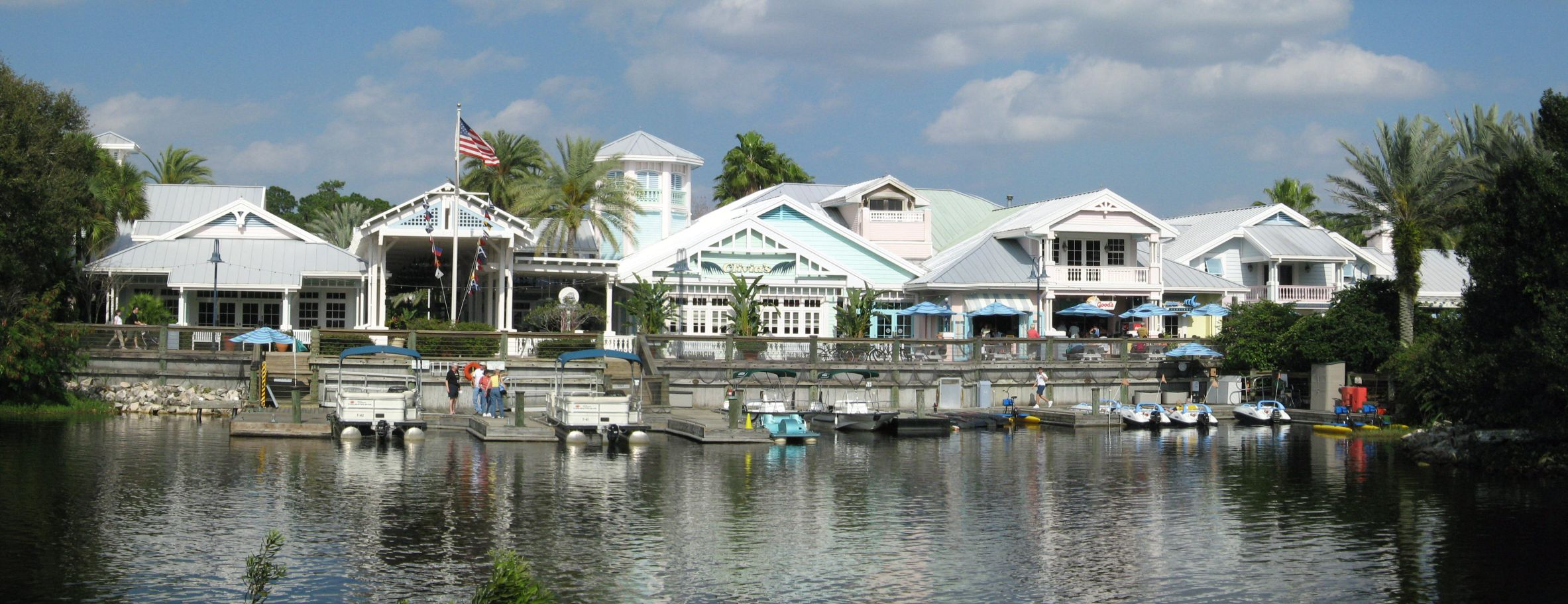
- Interactive map of the Disney's Old Key West Resort area

General information
- Type: Resort
- Location: Disney Springs Resort Area
- Opened: December 20, 1991
- Operator: Disney Experiences

Disney's Old Key West Resort is a Disney Vacation Club (DVC) resort located at the Walt Disney World Resort in Lake Buena Vista, Florida.

It opened on December 20, 1991 as the company's first timeshare property, and as such, was simply named Disney's Vacation Club Resort. The property was renamed Disney's Old Key West Resort in January 1996 ahead of the second DVC location opening on the Walt Disney Resort property.

It has the largest rooms of any of the DVC resorts and each include kitchen facilities and a laundry room. The rooms are designed in a Key West theme. Rooms are also available year-round for rental by non-members as Disney Vacation Club retains ownership of a majority of the resort.

In October 2007, the resort received designation in the Florida Green Lodging Program.

== Dining ==
Olivia's Cafe is the only restaurant at Disney's Old Key West Resort and offers American style breakfast, lunch, and dinner menu.

Good's Food to Go is a counter service location located on the Turtle Krawl.

Gurgling Suitcase is the bar at Disney's Old Key West Resort.

Turtle Shack is a counter service location at the village pool on Old Turtle Pond Road.

== Transportation ==
Disney's Old Key West Resort is served by Disney Transport bus and watercraft transportation to Disney Springs.
