= Disney's Port Orleans Resort =

Hotel at Walt Disney World

- Interactive map of the Disney's Port Orleans Resort area

General information
- Type: Resort
- Location: Disney Springs Resort Area
- Opened: French Quarter: May 17, 1991; Riverside: February 2, 1992

Other information
- Number of rooms: 3,056
- Number of suites: Royal Guest Room (Riverside)

Disney's Port Orleans Resort French Quarter and Disney's Port Orleans Resort Riverside are a pair of hotels at Walt Disney World Resort in Lake Buena Vista, Florida that form a single resort. They are themed to look like New Orleans and the Antebellum South. They are located in the Disney Springs area and are owned and operated by Disney Experiences.

The two resorts are connected to each other and Disney Springs via the Sassagoula River. With over 3,000 rooms between them, they have the largest number of rooms of any resort on the Walt Disney World property. The Riverside section alone is the second-largest resort in Walt Disney World.

They are classified as Moderate resorts within Disney's portfolio (between the Value and Deluxe classifications).

== Design and history ==
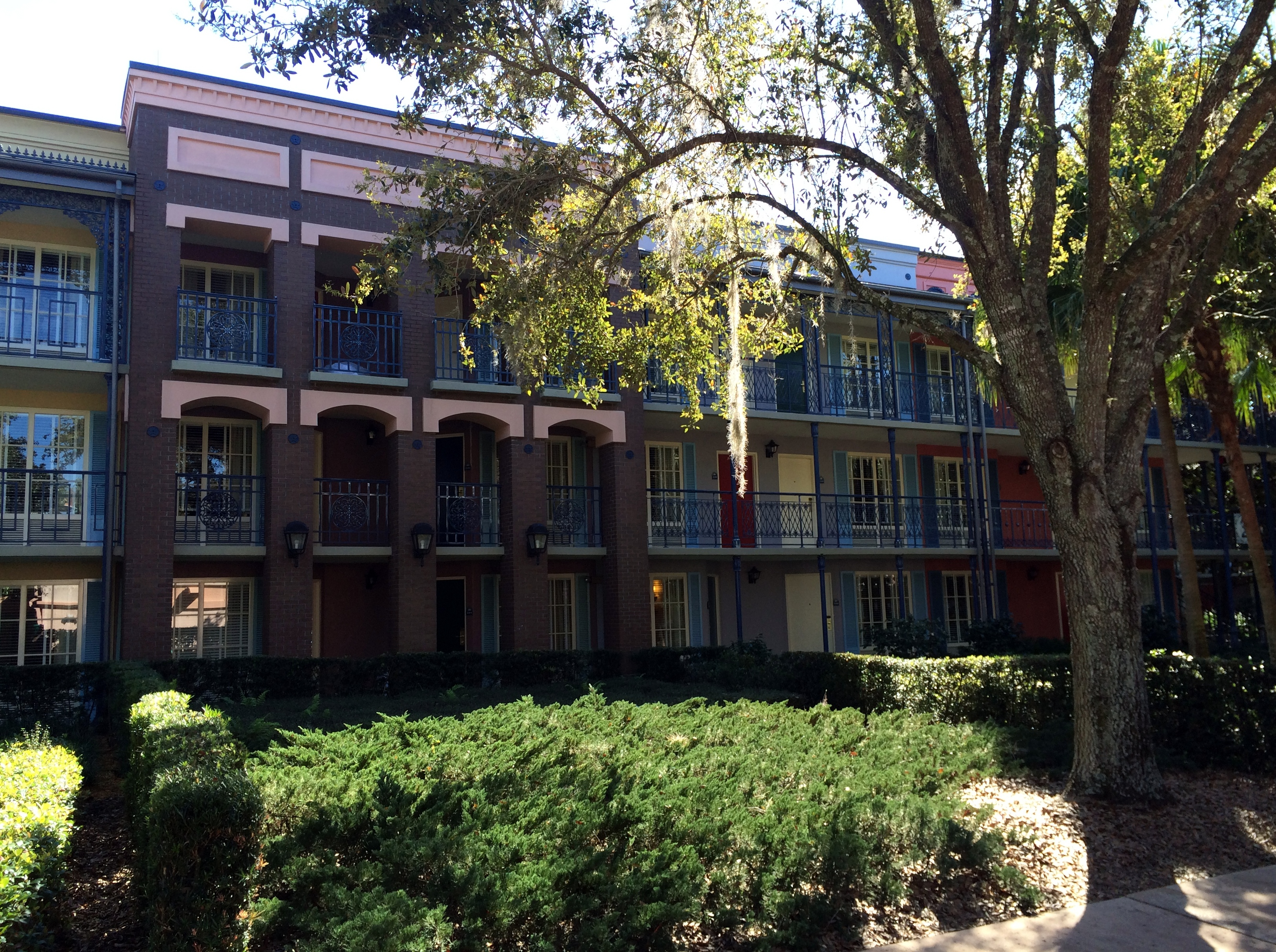
Port Orleans French Quarter room complex

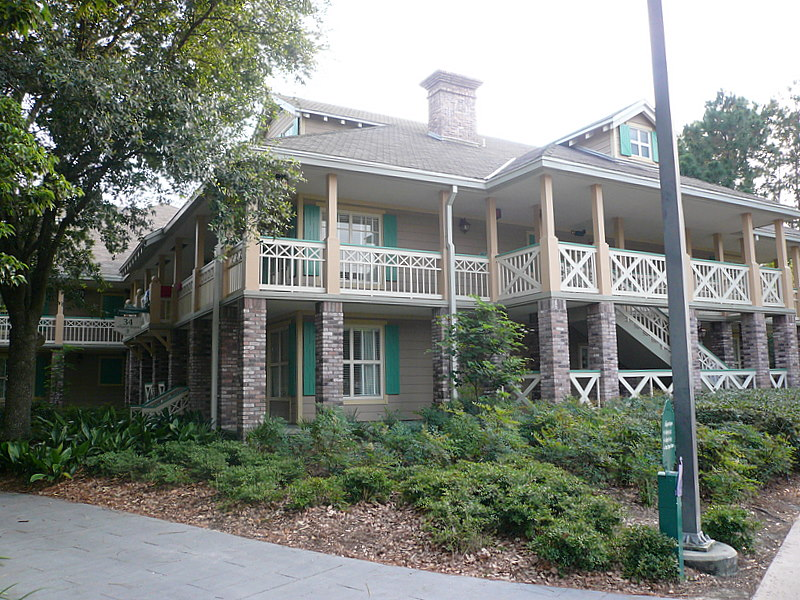
Port Orleans Riverside room complex

Disney's Port Orleans Resort French Quarter was designed to reflect the style and architecture of New Orleans' French Quarter. It opened on May 17, 1991, as Disney's Port Orleans Resort, with 432 guest rooms in three buildings. It later expanded to its current 1,008 rooms in seven three-story buildings containing 144 rooms each.

Disney's Port Orleans Resort Riverside was designed to reflect the Antebellum South along the Mississippi River. It opened on February 2, 1992 as Disney's Dixie Landings Resort, initially with rooms located in its Alligator Bayou section. The remaining Magnolia Bend section was opened shortly thereafter. Alligator Bayou has 1,024 guest rooms over 16 buildings, styled as rustic, weathered lodges, with 64 rooms per lodge. Magnolia Bend has 1,024 guest rooms over four buildings styled as southern plantation grand manor homes, with 256 rooms per mansion.

Beginning March 1, 2001, road signage and other theming began to change, reflecting the Disney's Port Orleans Resort and Disney's Dixie Landings Resort properties becoming "regions" of a united Disney's Port Orleans Resort. As of April 1, 2001, the regions became French Quarter and Riverside. Changes leading up to and after this period included the French Quarter region losing Bonfamille's Cafe table-service restaurant, bike rentals, and boat rentals. French Quarter region guests had to use the larger facilities in the Riverside region. Bonfamille's Cafe is now only used occasionally as a meeting space for food and beverage management and a training facility. Bonfamille's Cafe's kitchen is Disney World's test kitchen. Other theme changes included Colonel's Cotton Mill food court becoming Riverside Mill.

In 2011, Disney transformed about a quarter of the 2,000 rooms in the Riverside section of Disney's Port Orleans Resort into the Royal Guest Rooms.

On October 22, 2019, Disney expanded their Mobile Food Ordering system to a total of 35 Quick Service locations, including the Riverside Mill Food Court at Riverside and Sassagoula Floatworks and Food Factory at Port Orleans. The system allows guests to use the My Disney Experience app to pre-order their food prior to arrival at the food court.

The Original Scat Cat’s location was replaced by a beignets cafe called Scat Cat's Club Café, and the lounge was moved to the old Bonfamille's Cafe.

In 2020, the resort closed due to the worldwide COVID-19 pandemic and did not reopen until October 28, 2021 (French Quarter) and October 14, 2021 (Riverside).

== See also ==
- List of largest hotels
