= Disney's Grand Floridian Resort & Spa =

Hotel at Walt Disney World

Coordinates: 28.411444°N 81.586792°W

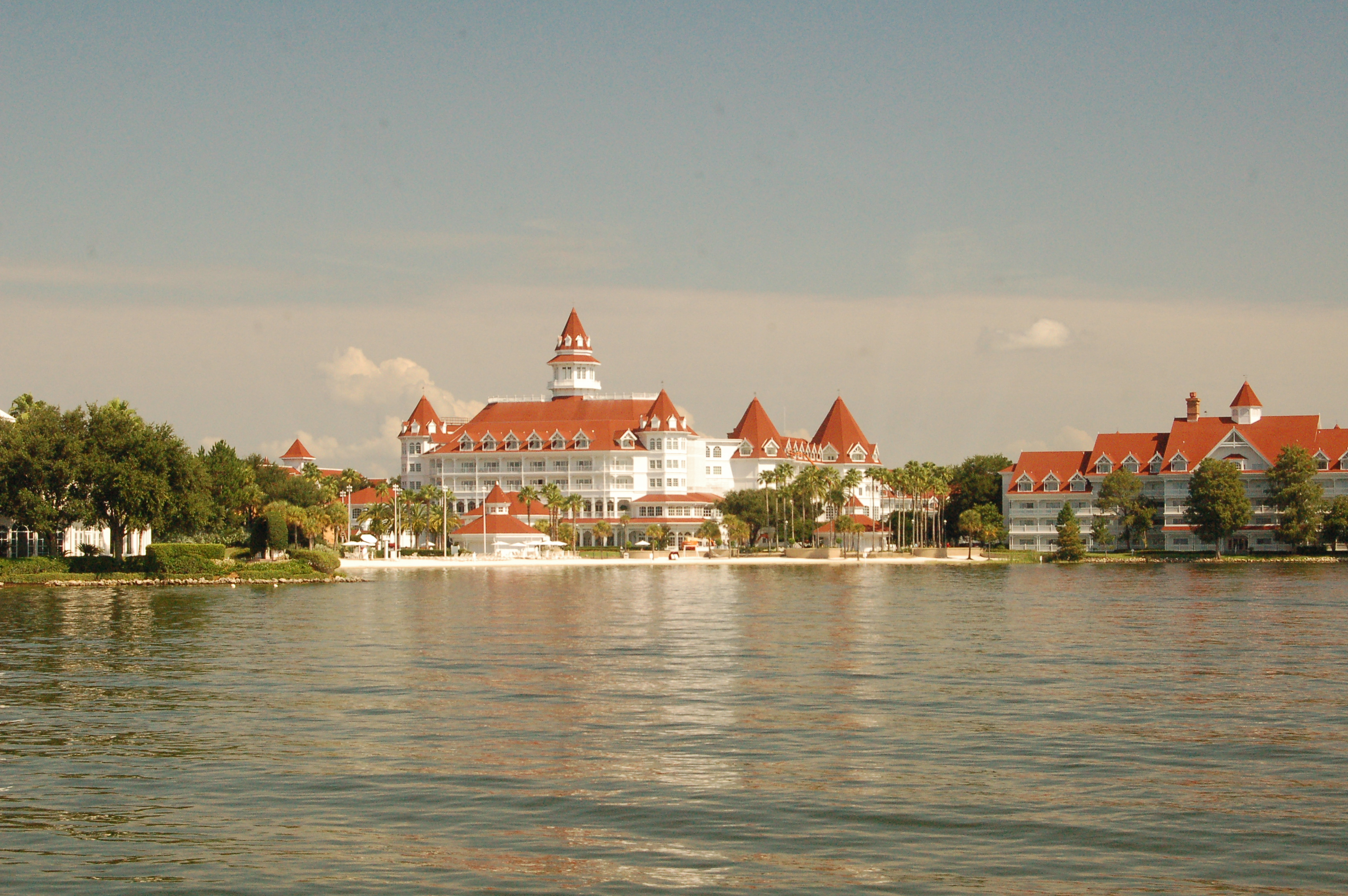

General information
- Type: Resort
- Location: Magic Kingdom Resort Area
- Opened: June 28, 1988; 38 years ago

Other information
- Number of rooms: 867
- Number of suites: 25, including the Victorian Suite, the Roy O. Disney Suite, the Walt Disney Suite, and the Grand Suite

Website
- Official website

Disney's Grand Floridian Resort & Spa is a Victorian themed hotel and spa located at the Walt Disney World Resort in Bay Lake, Florida. The property opened on June 28, 1988, as the Grand Floridian Beach Resort. The name changed to Disney's Grand Floridian Resort & Spa during the fall of 1997. The resort contains 867 rooms among six buildings at an average of 400 square feet (37 m^{2}) per room.

The Grand Floridian is categorized as a "deluxe" resort. It is also distinguished as Disney's flagship and most opulent resort.

== History and influences ==
The Grand Floridian was inspired by the Victorian-era beach resorts built along Florida's east coast during the late 19th and early 20th century. Its exterior is modelled after the Mount Washington Resort in Bretton Woods, New Hampshire, and Hotel del Coronado in Coronado, California, with red gabled roofs and white walls. Additional design inspiration was taken from the former Belleview-Biltmore Hotel in Belleair, Florida.

Initially, Walt Disney wanted a Polynesian resort (reflecting Adventureland), the Contemporary Resort to echo Tomorrowland, and other resorts that mirrored the 'lands' of Magic Kingdom. Main Street and the Grand Floridian act as analogous reflections. The resort was designed by the Disney company and executed by the architectural firm Wimberly, Allison, Tong & Goo.

Along with Disney's Polynesian Village Resort, the Grand Floridian sits on the shores of the man-made Seven Seas Lagoon near Magic Kingdom. The hotel occupies land that had been earmarked for an Asian-themed resort during the initial development of Walt Disney World Resort in the late 1960s. The Beach Boys performed at the Grand Floridian in 1988 to film the music video for their hit song "Kokomo". In 1992, a 40,000-square-foot (3,700 m^{2}) convention center opened adjacent to the hotel, which contains a business center.

== Incidents ==
- On October 9, 1989, a 33-year-old woman from Glen Cove, New York, was killed when a tiny speedboat collided with a ferry boat. She and her 8-year-old son were broadsided by the ferry while trying to videotape friends and family members who were water skiing in the Seven Seas Lagoon. A crew member and a visitor on the ferry dove into the water and rescued her son. The boy was not hurt in the accident. The family sued Disney for $240 million, claiming that the ferry's operators should have seen the speedboat before it came so close.
- On June 14, 2016, two-year-old child Lane Graves was fatally attacked by an American alligator which dragged him from the shore of the resort's beach into the Seven Seas Lagoon. The child's body was recovered a day later. A lighthouse sculpture paying tribute to the child was unveiled in 2017 at the resort near the incident's location.

== Gallery ==
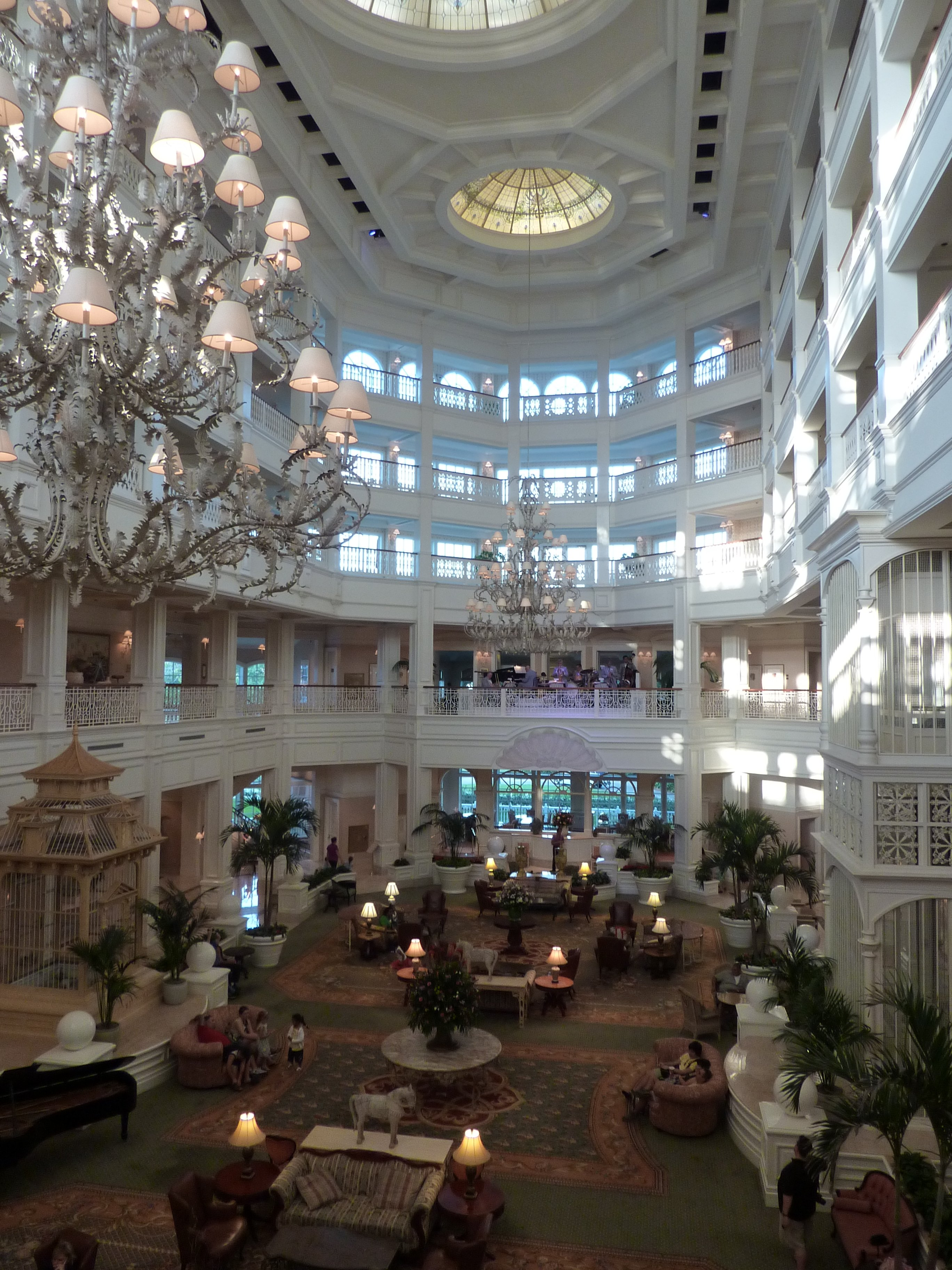
The lobby of the Grand Floridian Resort

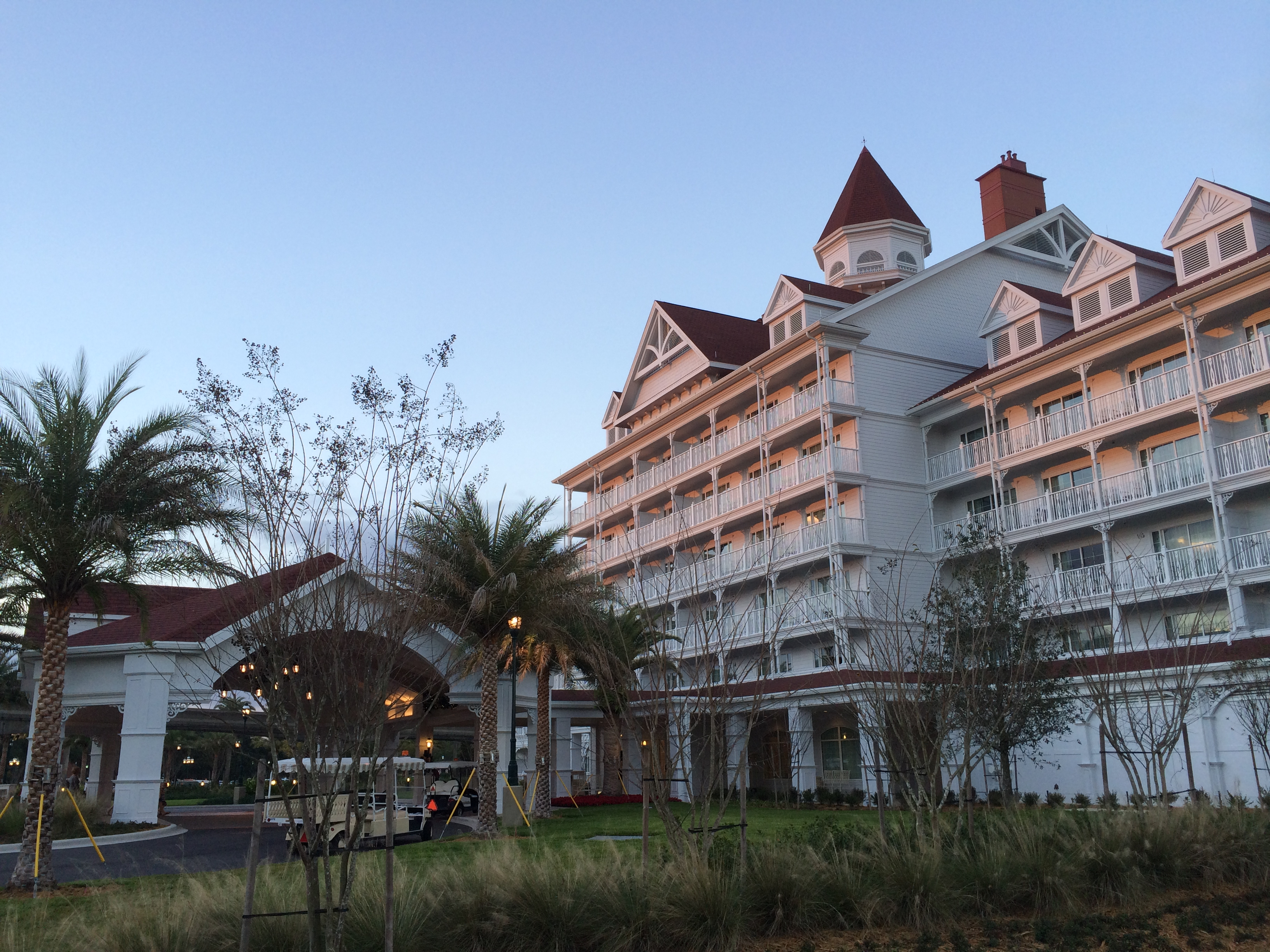
The Port Cochere of the Villas

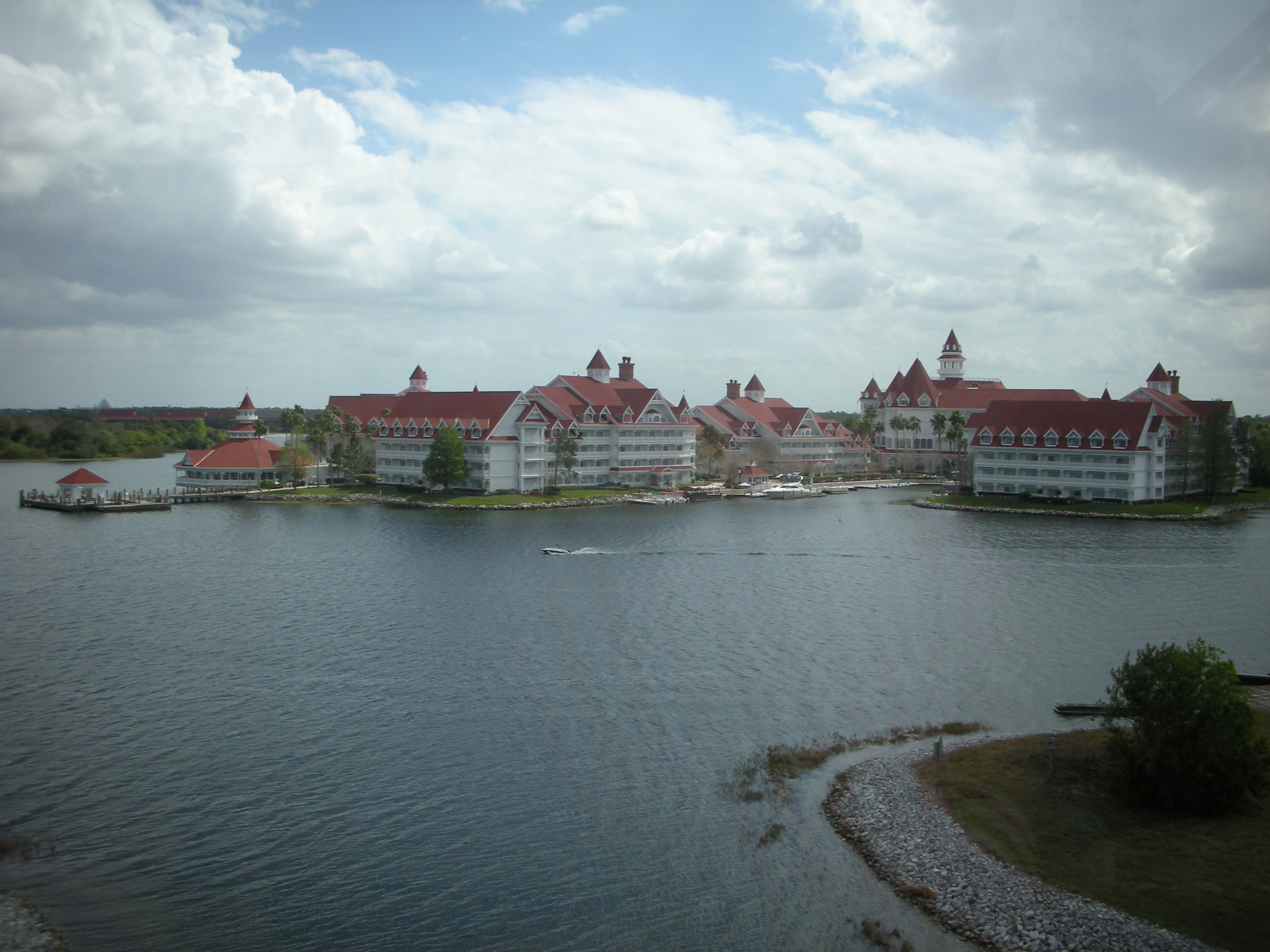
A view of the Grand Floridian from the monorail

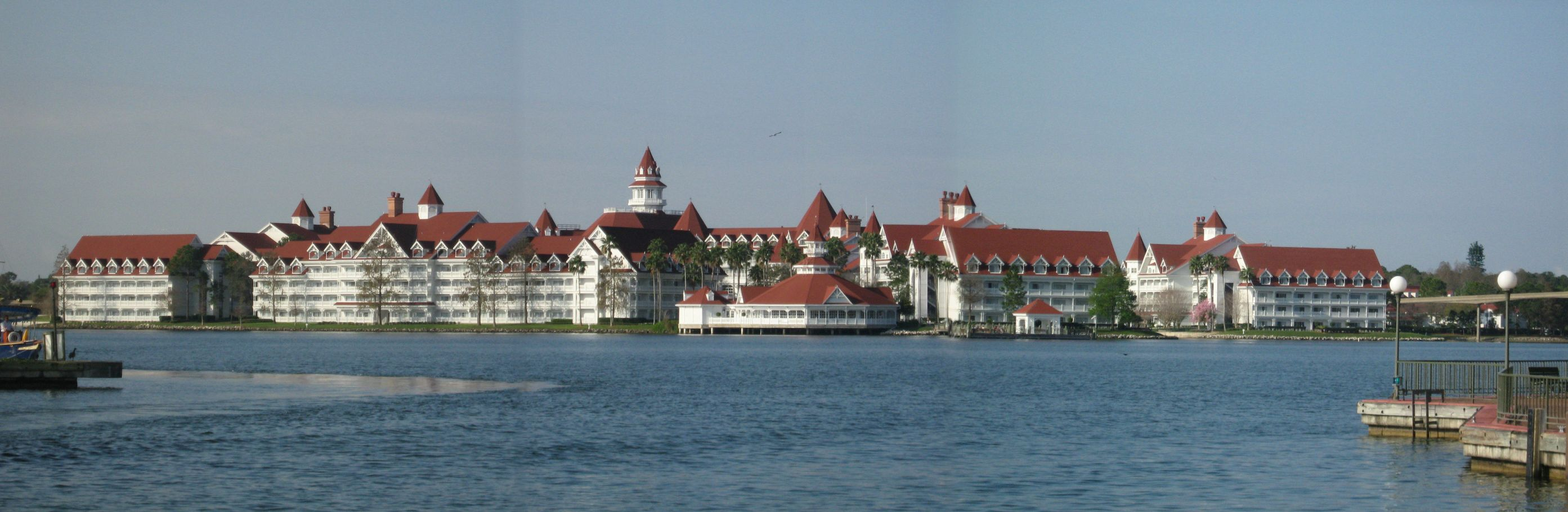
The Grand Floridian property as viewed from the entrance to Magic Kingdom

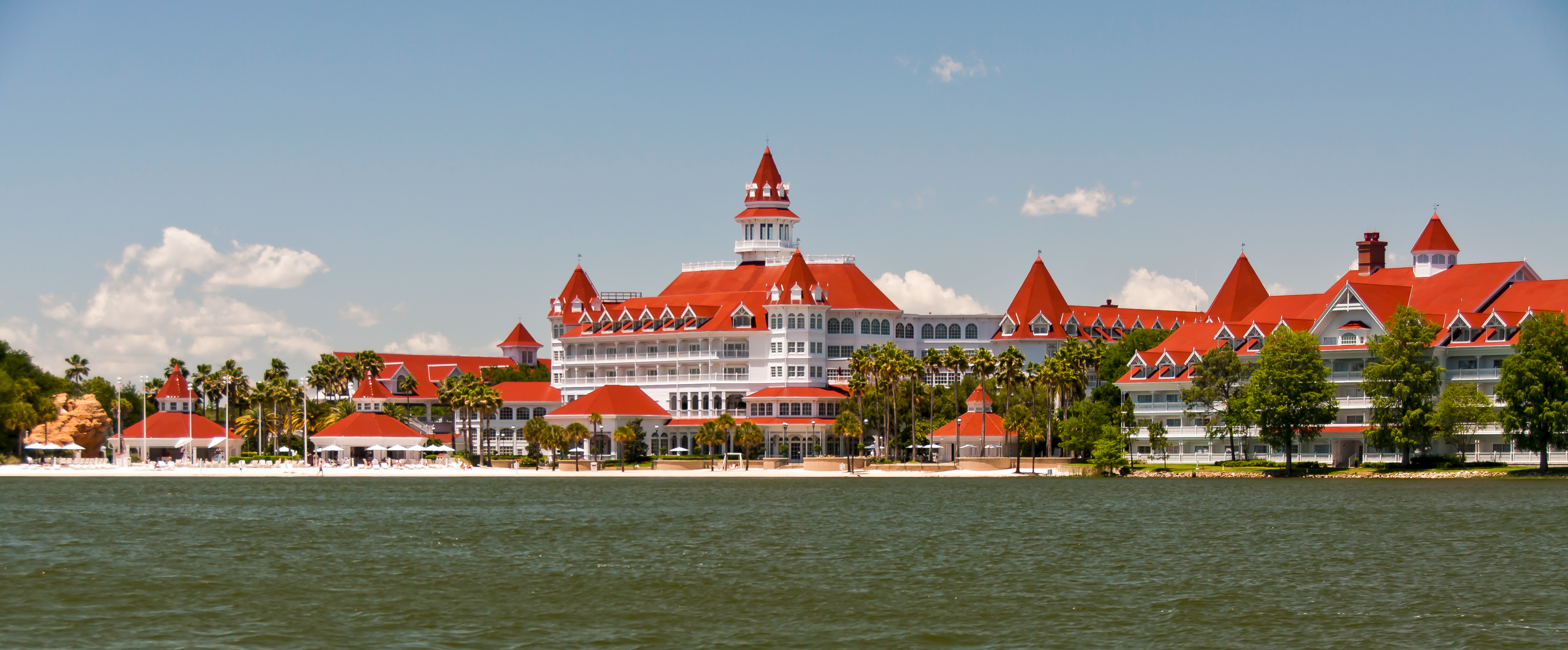
Disney's Grand Floridian Resort & Spa taken from Seven Seas Lagoon

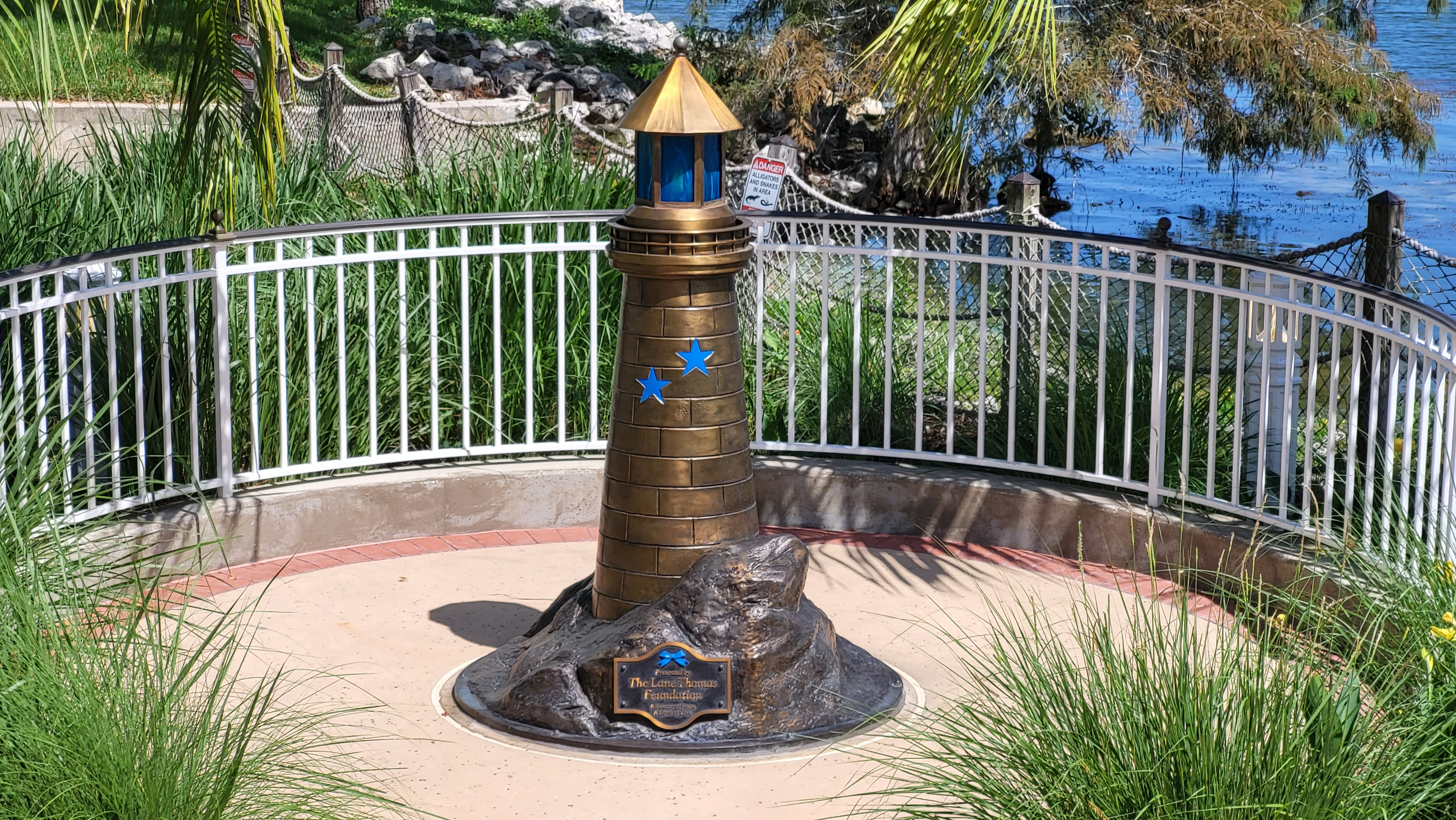
Sculpture dedicated to Lane Graves, a boy killed by a wild alligator at the resort in 2016

== See also ==
- Victoria & Albert's

Preceding station	Walt Disney World Monorail System	Following station
Disney's Polynesian Village Resort One-way operation	Resort Line	Magic Kingdom Park Next clockwise
