= Seven Seas Lagoon =

Artificial lake in Florida

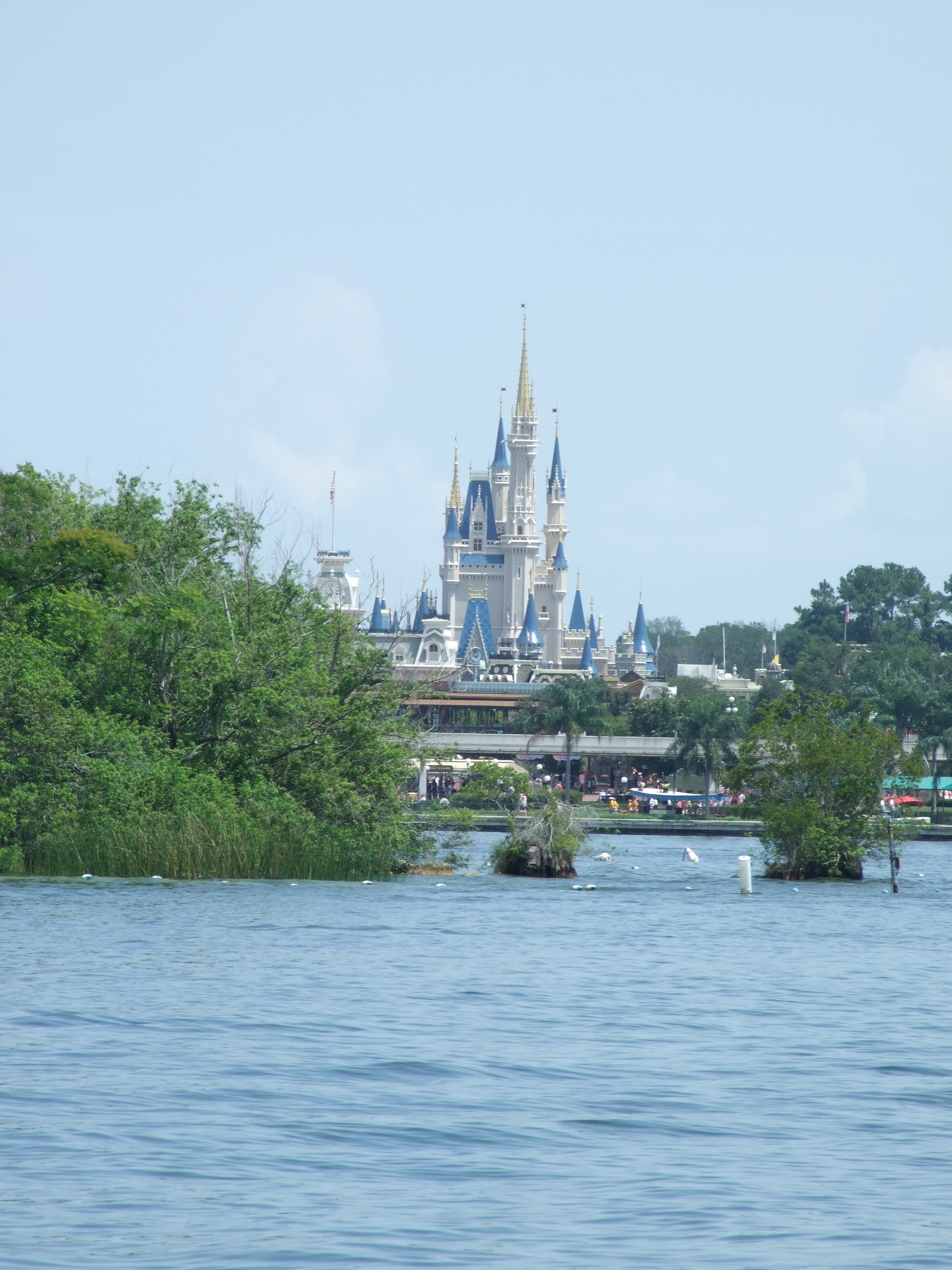
- Cinderella Castle, as viewed from Seven Seas Lagoon

- Location within Florida
- Location: Bay Lake, Florida
- Coordinates: 28.4113°N 81.5824°W
- Type: Artificial lake
- Basin countries: United States
- Managing agency: Reedy Creek Improvement District (Disney Parks, Experiences and Products)
- Built: c. mid-to-late 1960s
- First flooded: c. late 1960s
- Max. depth: 14 feet (4.3 m)
- Islands: 3
- Settlements: Bay Lake, Florida (see also Bordering resorts)

Seven Seas Lagoon is an artificial lake at Walt Disney World Resort in Bay Lake, Florida, near Orlando. Located south of Magic Kingdom theme park, Seven Seas Lagoon serves as a natural buffer between Magic Kingdom and its parking lot and connects with the adjacent Bay Lake. The lake reaches a depth of 14 feet (4.3 m). The lagoon is used mainly for recreational boating, as well as by the resort's three Disney Transport ferryboats that transport guests between Magic Kingdom and the Transportation and Ticket Center.

== Uses ==
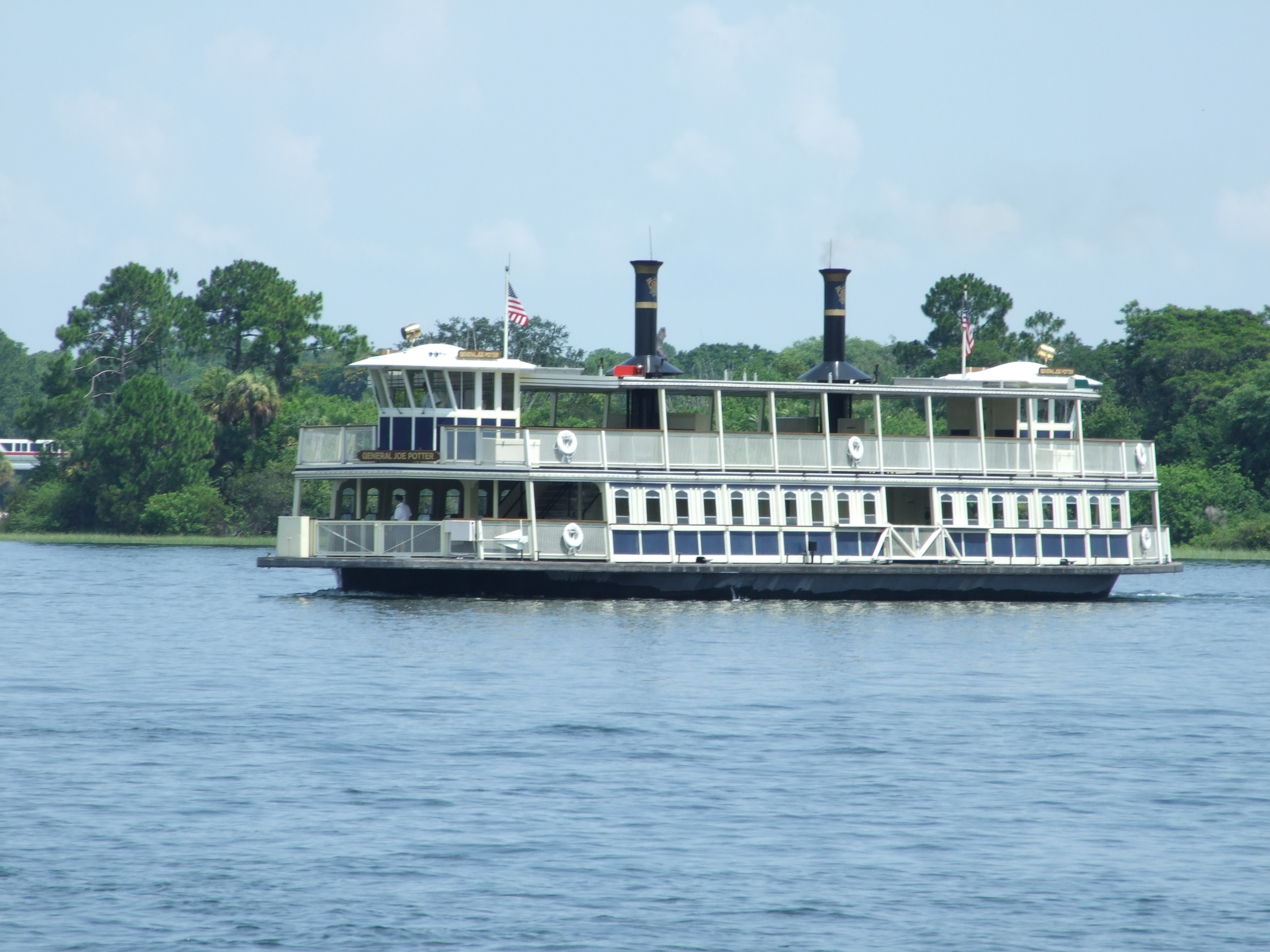
The General Joe Potter ferryboat, used for transporting guests to the Magic Kingdom.

Seven Seas Lagoon is used for boating activities at the resort. Fishing was not allowed in the lagoon until the mid-1990s, some 25 years after Walt Disney World's opening. However, the plan had existed from the start and fish were set free in the lagoon in 1973. Swimming was originally allowed, but has since been prohibited for safety reasons due to the operation of the rental boats and the existence of a single-cell amoeba Naegleria fowleri identified in the water that has been credited with several illnesses and at least one death. The lagoon is also the site of the Electrical Water Pageant. The lagoon, despite being man-made, is home to native Florida species such as alligators, lizards, snakes, and turtles.

== Islands of the lagoon ==
There are three islands on Seven Seas Lagoon: Blackbeard Island, Castaway Cay, and Beachcomber Island.

=== Blackbeard Island ===
Blackbeard Island is located near the water bridge that connects Seven Seas Lagoon and Bay Lake.

=== Castaway Cay ===
The island of Castaway Cay is currently used as the launching point for perimeter fireworks within special events and holidays at Magic Kingdom Park. It also shares the name of the island accessed by Disney Cruise Line in the Bahamas.

=== Beachcomber Island ===
Previously the site of an artificial wave machine for surfing in the early 1970s. It was later discontinued due to issues such as beach erosion, temperamental technology, cost, and navigational issues for watercraft within the lagoon. The artificial wave machine was more than a decade of being out of service when it was refurbished in 1985. The attempt in 1985 led to more beach erosion and later a permanent shutdown. Remnants of machine are still under the surface of the lagoon, as the cost of removal would have been massive.

== History ==
The original c.1966-67 master plan for Walt Disney World never included plans for Seven Seas Lagoon, Walt Disney had only envisioned an expanded Bay Lake as a large open body of water. What would become the lagoon was originally conceived as home to various themed resorts which were relatively landlocked which would be separated from Magic Kingdom by golf courses, an ice rink and a rollerskating dome. Original plans showed the monorail terminating in front of Magic Kingdom entrance on a linear route with three WEDway People Movers lines connecting guests to the various resorts. This would all change after Walt's death where major changes were made with the design of WDW. Most likely due to the swampy nature of the land, Bay Lake was expanded and the lagoon created from excess water displaced by the theme park, resorts, parking lots, golf courses. The revised plans would see the monorail circle the lagoon with parking and a transportation center built on the South shore connecting the various resorts.

Seven Seas Lagoon was a project the first phase of Resort Developments for the creation of Walt Disney World Resort. Earth exceeding seven million cubic yards was relocated for the creation of the man-made lagoon. The earth that was moved was used to cover the utilidor of Magic Kingdom Park.

=== The Walt Disney World Water Ski Show ===
The Walt Disney World Ski Show was an event held at Seven Seas Lagoon and Bay Lake at Walt Disney World Resort in the 1970s. Shows were held five times daily. The show included eight-person, three-tiered pyramid, an exposition of flex-wing kite flying at 300 feet over the water and a series of jumps over a five and one-half foot ramp. Various characters, such as Dumbo, Goofy, and Pinocchio were in the show.

=== 2016 alligator attack ===
At around 9:15 p.m. on June 14, 2016, a two-year-old boy wading in the Seven Seas Lagoon at the Grand Floridian Resort & Spa was grabbed and mauled to death by an alligator. His parents tried to intervene, but they were unsuccessful. The boy's intact body was discovered at the bottom of the lagoon at approximately 1:45 p.m. the following afternoon; he was found near where he went missing 12 to 15 yards (11 to 14 m) from the shore in about 6 feet (1.8 m) of water. The medical examiner ruled that the child died of "drowning and traumatic injuries." Reuters reported that the resort would put up signs warning guests about alligators and five of them were later killed in the search, to examine their stomachs. Shortly after the incident, Disney temporarily removed several references to alligators from various attractions throughout Disney World.

=== Terrain adjustments ===
After the 2016 alligator attack, the beaches and walkways of the Seven Seas Lagoon received an updated shoreline, which now features sharp, giant rocks and roped-off gates dividing guests from the shoreline of the lagoon. Signs warning guests about the wildlife of the lake were added as well.

== Watercraft ==
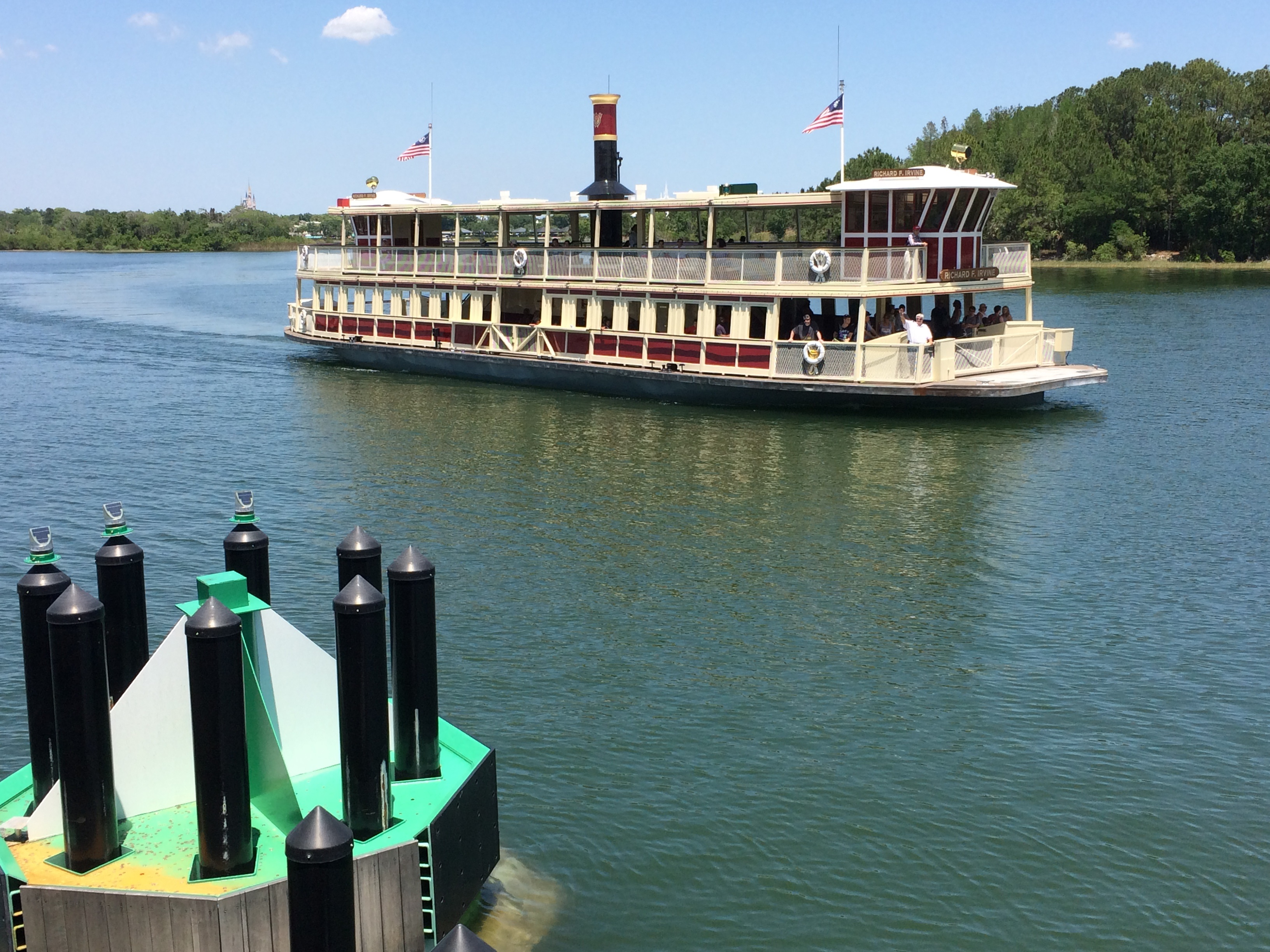
The Richard F. Irvine ferry in the Seven Seas Lagoon

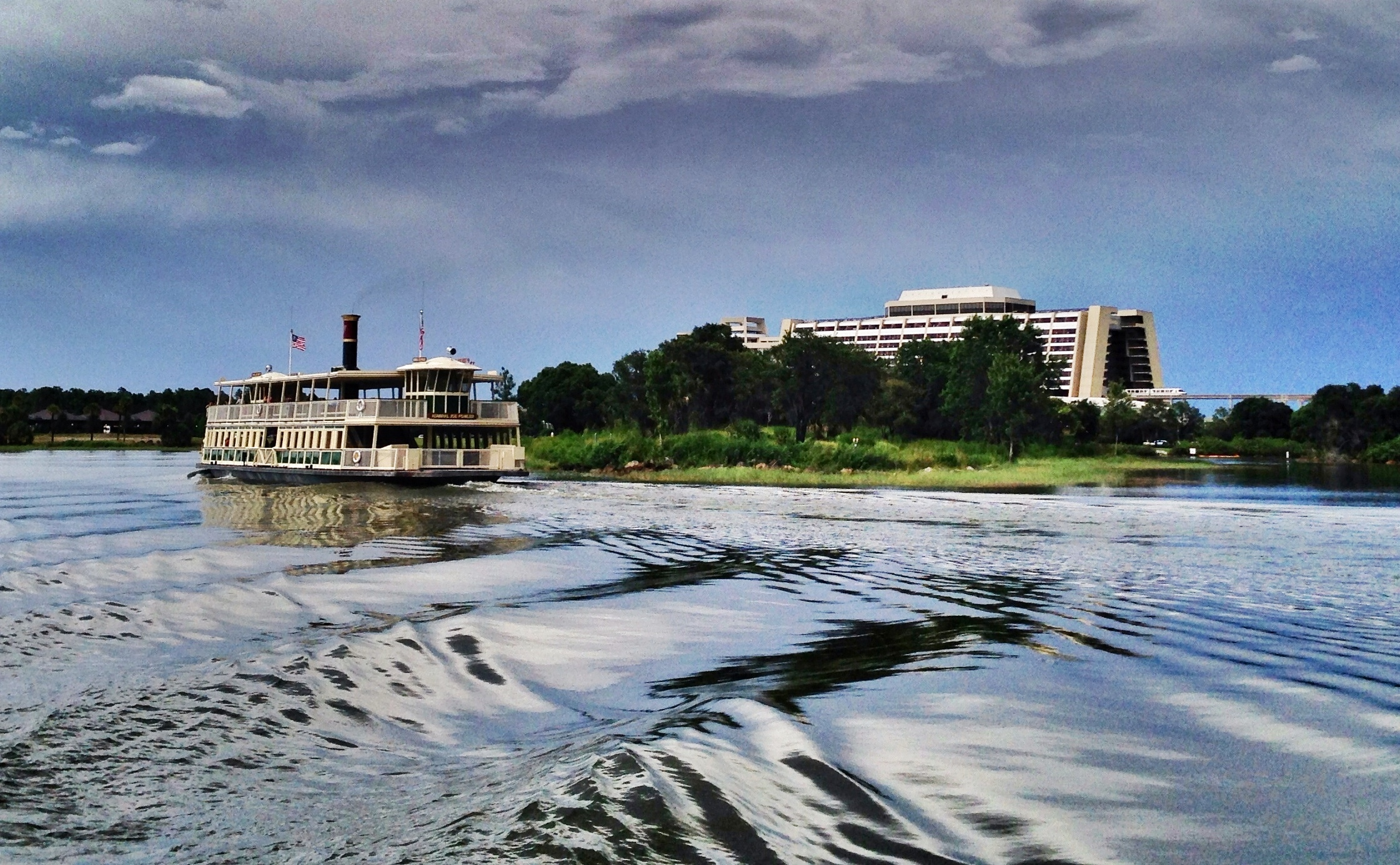
Admiral Joe Fowler Ferryboat

Disney Transport ferries operating include Admiral Joe Fowler (formerly Magic Kingdom I), Richard F. Irvine (formerly Magic Kingdom II) and, since 1976, General Joe Potter (formerly Kingdom Queen). Other smaller watercraft also operate. Two steam-powered sidewheelers formerly operated, Southern Seas until 1975 and Ports O' Call until 1982. Southern Seas was replaced in 1977 by Southern Seas II, a slightly larger sidewheeler that was diesel-powered instead of steam-powered, that operated until 1996. All three boats that travel the Seven Seas Lagoon were named after people who were instrumental in the creation of Disney World.

== Bordering resorts ==
Three resorts border the Seven Seas Lagoon, all of which have beaches. These hotels are the only hotels on Walt Disney World property that are directly serviced by the Walt Disney World Monorail System, allowing full monorail access from these hotels to the Magic Kingdom, Epcot, and the Transportation and Ticket Center.

- Disney's Contemporary Resort
  - Bay Lake Tower (Disney Vacation Club)
- Disney's Grand Floridian Resort & Spa
- Disney's Polynesian Village Resort
