= Disney Resort Line =

Monorail line at the Tokyo Disney Resort

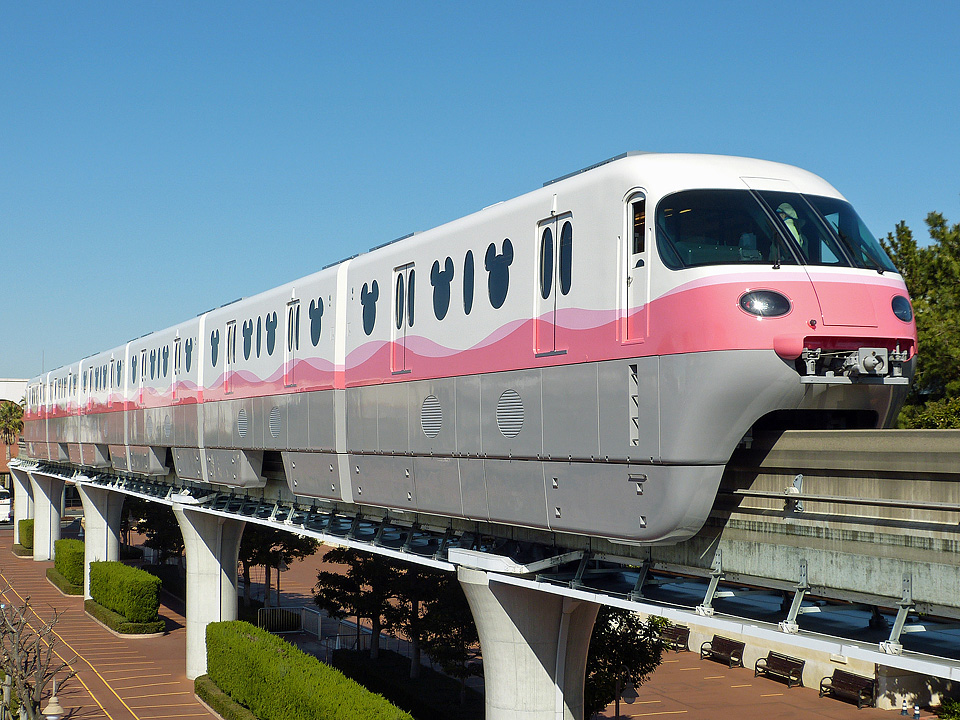
- Disney Resort Line train, February 2021

Overview
- Native name: ディズニーリゾートライン
- Owner: Maihama Resort Line Co., Ltd. (The Oriental Land Company)
- Locale: Tokyo Disney Resort, Urayasu, Chiba
- Transit type: Automated straddle-beam monorail (Alweg‑type)
- Number of stations: 4

Operation
- Began operation: 27 July 2001; 25 years ago
- Operators: Maihama Resort Line Co., Ltd.
- Character: Elevated
- Rolling stock: Type C (100 series)

Technical
- System length: 5 km (3.1 mi)
- No. of tracks: 1
- Electrification: Contact rails, 1,500 V DC
- Top speed: 50 km/h (31 mph)

The Disney Resort Line (Note: Japanese: ディズニーリゾートライン, Hepburn: Dizunī Rizōto Rain) is an automated straddle-beam, Alweg-type monorail line serving the Tokyo Disney Resort in Urayasu, Chiba, Japan. Operated by Maihama Resort Line Co., Ltd., (Note: 株式会社舞浜リゾートライン, Kabushiki gaisha Maihama Rizōto Rain) a subsidiary of the Oriental Land Company (OLC), the system connects Maihama Station to major resort destinations including Tokyo Disneyland, Tokyo DisneySea, hotels, and commercial facilities. Passenger service began on 27 July 2001, shortly before the opening of Tokyo DisneySea.

== History ==
Plans for a monorail serving the Tokyo Disney Resort began to emerge in the 1990s as the resort expanded. While Tokyo Disneyland was within easy walking distance of Maihama Station, the development of Tokyo DisneySea and several large hotels made the area too large to navigate on foot. The monorail provided a transportation solution while also opening up more land for development, including additional resort hotels.

The project received government approval in 1997, and construction began the following year. Trial operations started in 2000, and the Disney Resort Line opened on 27 July 2001, just two months before DisneySea's opening.

In the years after opening, the line saw steady ridership and several system upgrades. In 2009, the line began accepting IC cards including Pasmo and Suica, and tickets transitioned from magnetic stripe to QR codes in 2025. Fares have been revised periodically in line with changes to Japan’s consumption tax. A major modernization program began in 2019 with the introduction of the Type C fleet, which replaced the original Type X trains between 2020 and 2024.

== Operations ==
The Disney Resort Line is a single-track, counterclockwise loop linking Maihama Station with facilities throughout the resort. A complete circuit takes about 13 minutes, with travel times of two to four minutes between adjacent stations. Up to four trains operate simultaneously, providing headways as short as 3.25 minutes.

Trains operate under an automatic train operation (ATO) system corresponding to Grades of Automation 3 (GoA3/DTO), with an onboard conductor responsible for door control and safety monitoring. Manual controls are located at both ends of each train; with the forward-facing operating area typically open to passengers with the master controller and instruments covered.

Safety features include platform screen doors at all stations and interlocked sensors on both car and platform doors that prevent departures unless all are fully secured. Station staff are present throughout most of the operating day to supervise boarding and ensure platform safety.

Although the line runs entirely on land owned by OLC and is sometimes mistaken for a park attraction due to its location within the resort, it is legally classified as a public railway. As such, standard fares are charged, IC cards are accepted, and season tickets are available. This differs from most other Disney monorail systems, which typically operate fare-free or are included with theme-park admission.

=== Fares and ticketing ===
A single-journey ticket allows one entry and one exit, with travel for up to one complete loop. Fares can be paid by IC card or by using cash at a ticket machine. Multi-ride passes are available as physical tickets and can be purchased with different validity periods, including one-day, multi-day, and monthly options. Children aged 6 to 11 pay half fare. Children under 1 year old ride free, and up to two children aged 1 to 5 ride free with each paying adult.

== Stations ==
All stations on the line are located on OLC property and are not directly connected to public roads. Platform gates are installed systemwide. Tokyo DisneySea Station and Resort Gateway Station use a Spanish solution with separate platforms for boarding and alighting to manage peak crowds.

Station	Image	First train	Last train	Platform	Connections
Resort Gateway (Note: リゾートゲートウェイ・ステーション, Rizōtogētou~ei sutēshon)		06:31	23:30	Dual	Keiyō Line (Maihama: JE07), Ikspiari, Disney Ambassador Hotel, Hotel Dream Gate Maihama
Tokyo Disneyland (Note: 東京ディズニーランド・ステーション, Tōkyō dizunīrando sutēshon)		06:33	23:32	Side	Tokyo Disneyland, Tokyo Disneyland Hotel
Bayside (Note: ベイサイド・ステーション, Beisaido sutēshon)		06:36	23:34	Side	Official Hotels (Fantasy Springs, Toy Story, Grand Nikko, Hilton, Hotel Okura, Sheraton, Sunroute Plaza, Tokyo Bay Maihama Hotel)
Tokyo DisneySea (Note: 東京ディズニーシー・ステーション, Tōkyō dizunīshī sutēshon)		06:40	23:39	Dual	Tokyo DisneySea, Tokyo DisneySea Hotel MiraCosta

== Rolling stock ==
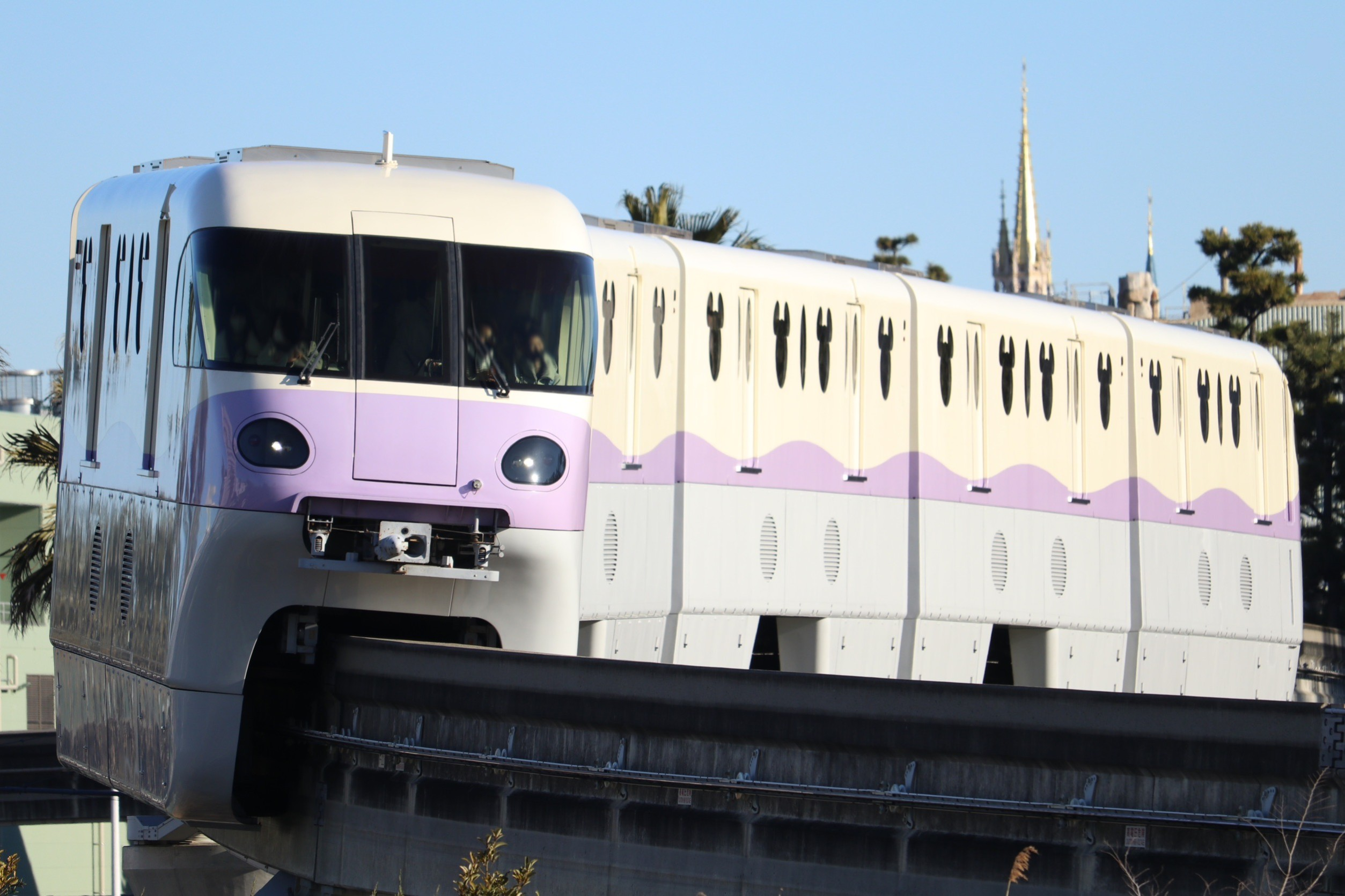
Type X train

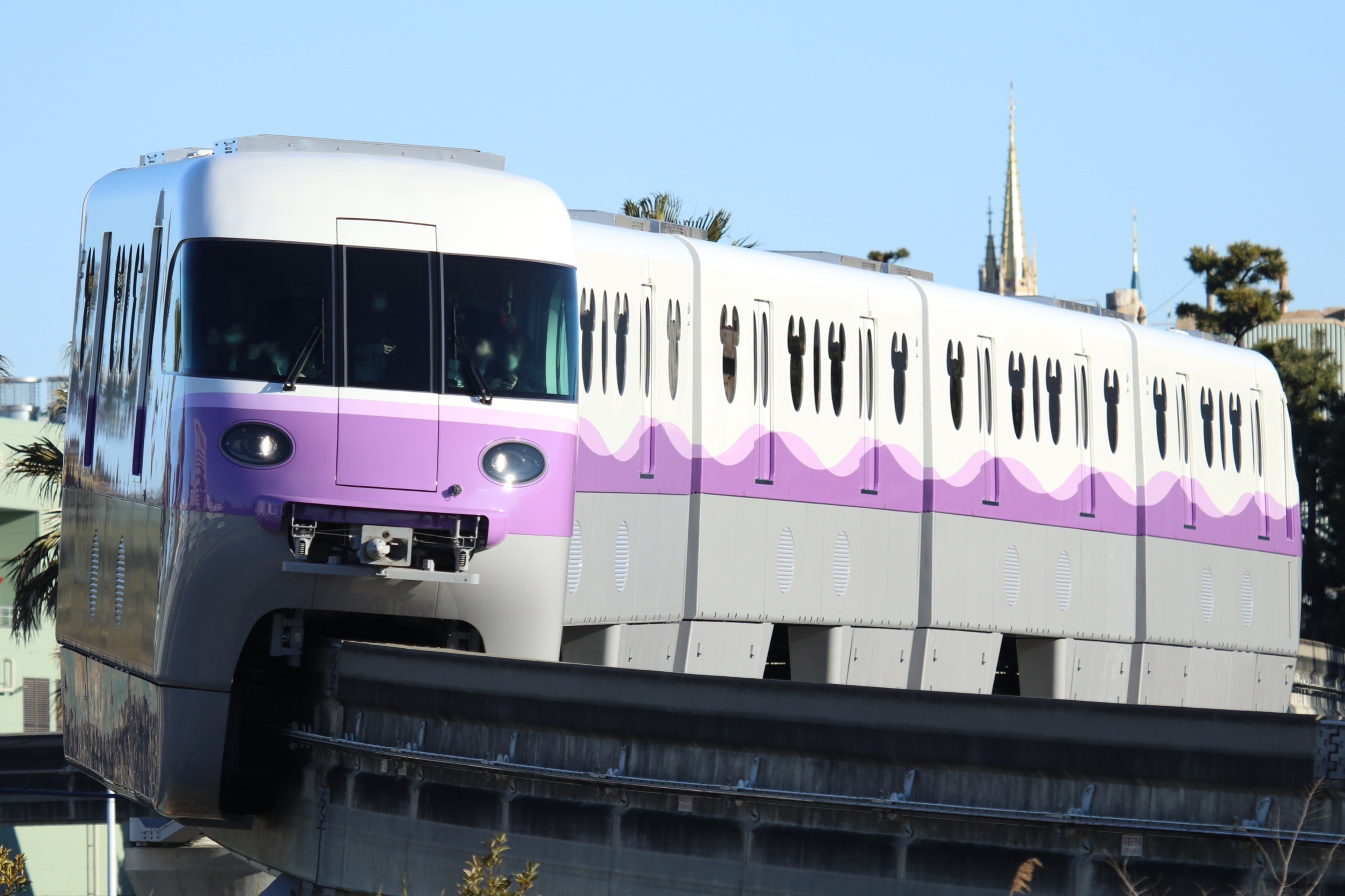
Type C train

All rolling stock operated on the Disney Resort Line since its opening has been built by Hitachi Rail using the company’s proprietary Hitachi Monorail standard-size platform.

The line is operated with a fleet of five six-car Resort Liner trains, based on Hitachi’s typical design but modified with Mickey Mouse–shaped windows. Each train is finished in a distinct wave-themed color scheme. Although the trains are equipped for fully automatic operation, an employee rides in a cab at the rear of each train for safety monitoring. Up to four trains operate on the loop simultaneously, with a minimum headway of approximately three minutes.

Beginning in July 2020, the original Type X fleet was gradually replaced by Type C trainsets with similar exterior color schemes. The transition was completed on 1 January 2024, and a special “last ride” event for the retiring Type X trains was held on 1 September 2024. The overall investment for the fleet replacement project, which also included upgrades to signaling systems, was approximately ¥12.5 billion.

Externally, the Type C trains differ from the first-generation Type X through the removal of the front-window antenna, a revised two-tone livery, and significantly enlarged passenger windows—about 50% larger—to improve visibility.

The Type C interior increases total capacity to 564 passengers, compared with 537 on the Type X. Interior space is expanded in both height and width, and the bench seating has been redesigned to improve comfort and speed passenger flow. The design incorporates Mickey Mouse-themed upholstery and Mickey-shaped hand straps at three heights for children and adults. To enhance accessibility, wider free-space areas are provided in the third and fourth cars, and the forward observation area in the lead car has been redesigned.

Type X (10 series)
Set	Car No.						Remarks
Blue (1)	11	12	13	14	15	16	Replaced 18 January 2022
Yellow (2)	21	22	23	24	25	26	Replaced 3 July 2020
Purple (3)	31	32	33	34	35	36	Replaced 18 November 2022
Green (4)	41	42	43	44	45	46	Replaced 1 January 2024
Peach (5)	51	52	53	54	55	56	Replaced 23 January 2021
Type C (100 series)
Set	Car No.						Remarks
Yellow (1)	111	112	113	114	115	116	Introduced 3 July 2020
Pink (2)	121	122	123	124	125	126	Introduced 23 January 2021
Blue (3)	131	132	133	134	135	136	Introduced 18 January 2022
Purple (4)	141	142	143	144	145	146	Introduced 18 November 2022
Green (5)	151	152	153	154	155	156	Introduced 1 January 2024

== Ridership statistics ==
The annual ridership figures for the line are as shown below.

Fiscal year	Passengers per year
2002	19,374,000
2007	15,370,000
2009	16,700,000

== See also ==
- Disneyland Monorail
- Monorails in Japan
- Rail transport in Walt Disney Parks and Resorts
- Walt Disney World Monorail System
