= Walt Disney Attractions Japan =

Subsidiary of Walt Disney Parks and Resorts

Walt Disney Attractions Japan is a wholly owned subsidiary of Disney Experiences, one of four sectors of the American entertainment conglomerate The Walt Disney Company.

Founded in 1982, a year before the opening of the Tokyo Disneyland theme park in Chiba, Japan, its purpose is to liaise with The Oriental Land Company – the financial owners of Tokyo Disneyland – in all aspects of running and maintaining the theme park.

== Activities ==
- Developing ideas for theme park attractions and expansions with Walt Disney Imagineering
- Regularly assessing whether the Tokyo Disney Resort is being maintained to Disney-set specifications
- Acting as the receiver of finances through licensing from the Oriental Land Company
- Approving decisions by the Oriental Land Company involving artistic properties owned by Disney
- Advertising the Tokyo Disney Resort in the United States

Walt Disney Attractions Japan played a major part in the expansion of 2001 from the Tokyo Disneyland theme park to the Tokyo Disney Resort which included a second theme park, Tokyo DisneySea, two Disney-branded hotels and a shopping, eating and entertainment district, Ikspiari.

== Management ==
Walt Disney Attractions Japan took its name from the former name of Walt Disney Parks and Resorts, Walt Disney Attractions. It was headed by Philippe Gas, who also heads International Development at Disney Parks, Experiences and Products, for example scouting for further locations for Disney resorts. Gas left the Walt Disney Company to become the chief executive officer of the Qiddiya Investment Company. Gas reported to Michael Colglazier, President and Managing Director, Disney Parks International, and to a certain extent, Toshio Kagami, chairman & CEO of the Oriental Land Company and by default the Tokyo Disney Resort.

== Projects ==
To celebrate the 100th anniversary of Winnie the Pooh, Disney Japan is hosting a new project, with Sho Sakurai, Snow Man's Ryohei Abe, and Travis Japan's Noel Kawashima chosen as ambassadors. "Pooh Time" was launched as an initiative to provide everyone who works hard in their busy daily lives a gentle moment to "do nothing". Regarding the project and the ambassadorship, the three coincided that now, as adults, the character has changed their point of view. They see now how profound and even philosophical its presence has been, and that, in a busy–busy world, it is nice to sometimes take some time to "enjoy the moment". The project starts on October 14, 2026, Pooh's "birthday".
