= Mediterranean Harbor (Tokyo DisneySea) =

Themed land

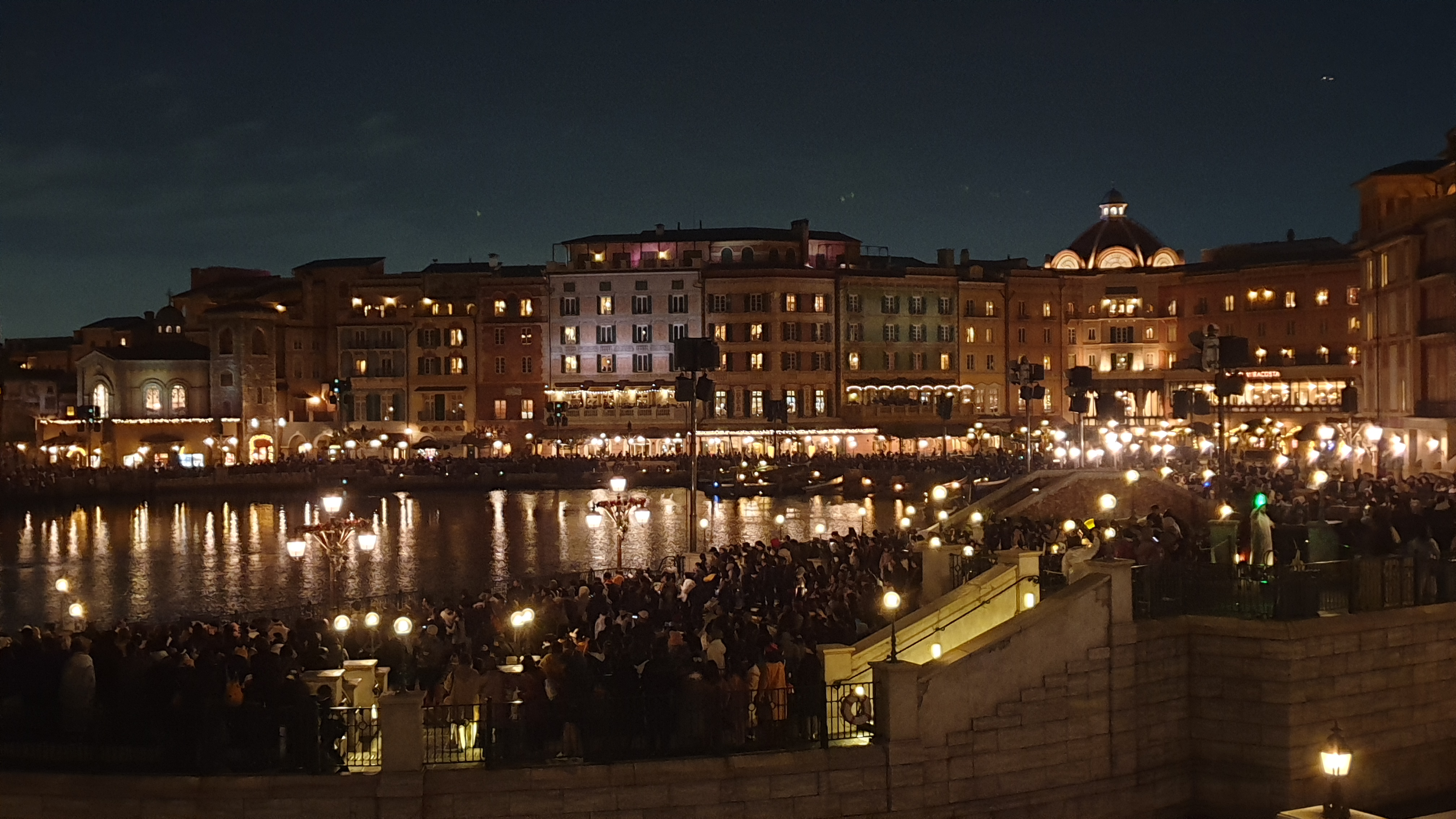
- View of Mediterranean Harbor at night (December 2019)
- Interactive map of Mediterranean Harbor
- Theme: Italian Port Cities

Attractions
- Total: 4
- Other rides: 3
- Shows: 1

Tokyo DisneySea
- Coordinates: 35°37′36″N 139°53′17″E
- Status: Operating
- Opened: 4 September 2001

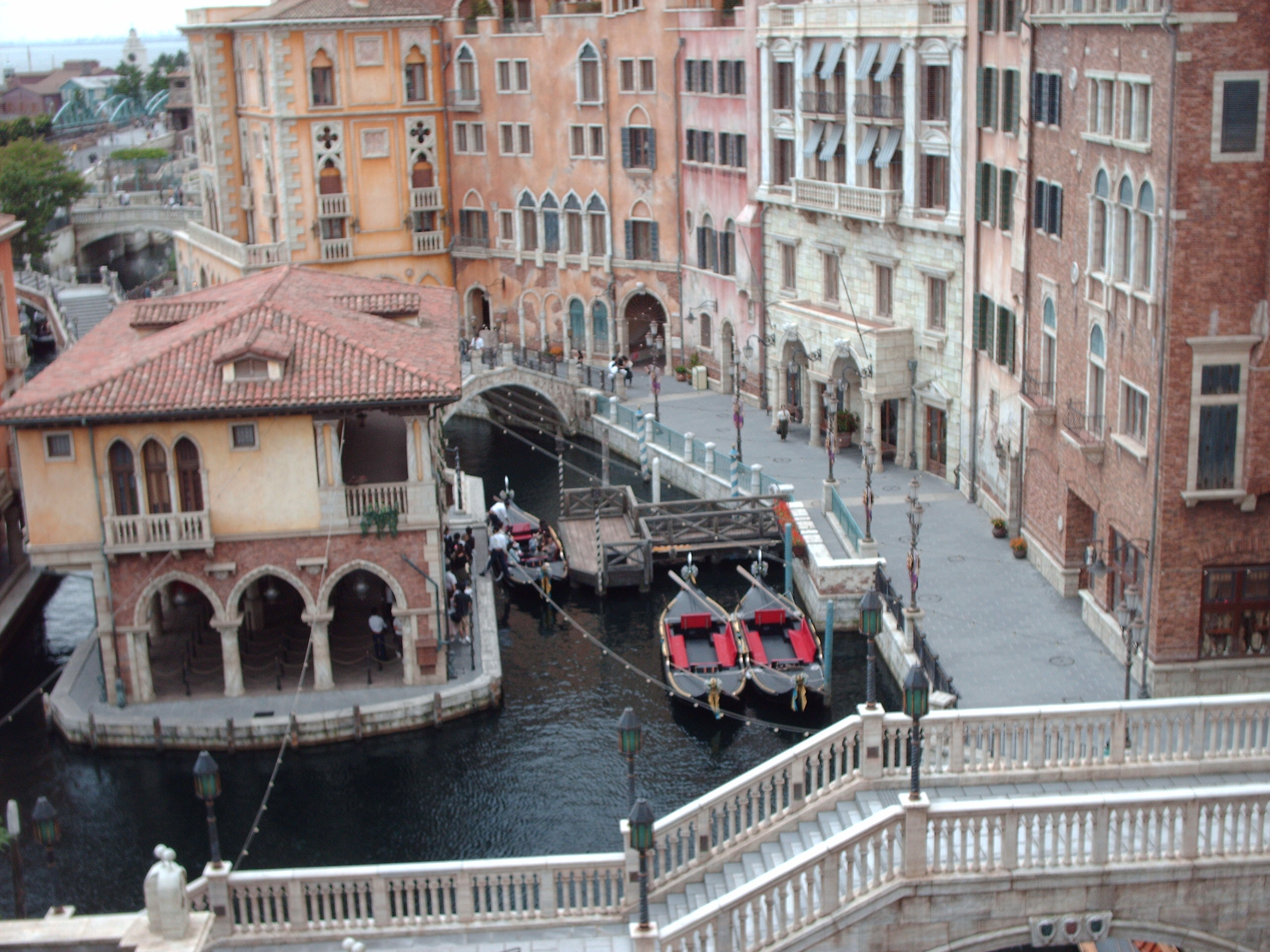
The Venetian Gondolas

Mediterranean Harbor is a themed area in Tokyo DisneySea, the second park in the Tokyo Disney Resort, located in Urayasu, Chiba, Japan, near Tokyo, which opened in 2001. Mediterranean Harbor is the entrance "port-of-call," or hub, themed as an Italian port city named "Porto Paradiso", complete with Venetian gondolas that guests can ride. The majority of places of interest throughout the port are various shops and restaurants.

== Theming and layout ==
Mediterranean Harbor's layout differs from the entry lands of other Disney parks as it is a large "V" shape rather than the main street that leads to a hub (as found in Disneyland's Main Street, U.S.A. or Disney's Hollywood Studios' Hollywood Boulevard). The right path leads to Mysterious Island, while the left leads to the American Waterfront. Built into the architecture of the port is the Tokyo DisneySea Hotel MiraCosta. The hotel itself serves as a full-scale reproduction of the various buildings of Portofino and Venice's ports. The design choice of combining a real hotel within the theme park areas helps to further the illusion that (as either a park or hotel guest) you are in an actual city. Since the hotel is a functional building (rather than a "set facade"—the general standard in theme park designs), the effect of onlooking hotel guests that may observe the park from hotel's rooms, balconies, and terraces serve in adding a level of kinetic authenticity in passing for an authentic Italian villa for park visitors, while the hotel guest enjoys the harborside views and novelty of location. Additionally, the Hotel MiraCosta also serves as the southern border of the park. Mediterranean Harbor also features attractions such as the Fortress Explorations, which is a meticulously themed, large-scale interactive play area for guests that features exploration-themed activities and attractions.

== Attractions ==
- DisneySea Transit Steamer Line (2001–present)
- Venetian Gondolas (2001–present)
- Fortress Explorations (2001–present)
- Soaring: Fantastic Flight (2019–present)

== Entertainment ==
=== Current ===
- Tokyo DisneySea Maritime Band (2001–present)
- Believe! Sea of Dreams (November 11, 2022–present)

=== Past ===
- Italian Flag Squad (2001–unknown)
- Mayor of Porto Paradiso (2001–unknown)
- Living Statues (2001–unknown)
- Singing Gondoliers (2001–unknown)
- The Alchemist (2001–unknown)
- Buccaneer Brigands (2001–unknown)
- DisneySea Symphony (2003–2004; first anniversary)
- BraviSEAmo! (2004–2011)
- Meet & Smile (2006–2007; "Sea of Dreams" fifth anniversary)
- Lido Isle Meet & Smile (2005–2006)
- Porto Paradiso Water Carnival (2001–2004; Spring 2005 & 2006)
- Trio Melodia (2006–2010)
- The Legend of Mythica (2006–2014; "Sea of Dreams" fifth anniversary)
- Disney in the Stars (2010)
- Be Magical! (2011–2012; "Be Magical!" 10th anniversary)
- Crystal Wishes Journey (2016–2017; "Year of Wishes" 15th anniversary)
- Fantasmic! (2011–2020)
- Mickey and Friends Harbor Greetings Time To Shine! (2021–2022; "Time to Shine!" 20th anniversary)
- Let's Celebrate With Color! (2023-2024; Tokyo Disney Resort 40th Anniversary "Dream-Go-Round")

Seasonal

- Lide Isle Welcome to Spring (Spring 2012)
- Spring Carnival Fairies Primavera (Spring 2009 & 2010)
- Primavera: Springtime Sun (Spring 2008)
- Spring Carnival Primavera (Spring 2007)
- Mousequerade Dance (Halloween Season 2008–2010)
- Candlelight Reflections (Winter Season 2005–2009; Harborside Christmas Celebration 2005–2010)
- Christmas Wrapped in Ribbons (Harborside Christmas Celebration 2011)
- Aladdin's Whole New World (2005)
- Minnie's Wishing Ring (2005; "Dramatic DisneySea 2005" fourth anniversary)
- Fantasy Springs Special Greeting (2024; Dreaming of Fantasy Springs)

== Restaurants and refreshments ==
- Cafe Portofino
- Zambini Brothers' Ristorante
- Mamma Biscotti's Bakery
- Ristorante di Canaletto
- Gondolier Snacks
- Magellan's
- Magellan's Lounge
- Refrescos

== Shopping ==
- Valentina's Sweets
- Emporio
- Galleria Disney
- Fotografica
- Il Postino Stationery
- Figaro's Clothiers
- Merchant of Venice Confections
- Venetian Carnival Market
- Miramare
- Piccolo Mercato
- Splendido
- Rimembranze
- Bella Minni Collections
