= Fantasy Springs =

Themed port in Tokyo DisneySea

- Interactive map of Fantasy Springs
- Status: Operating

Attractions
- Total: 4
- Other rides: 4

Tokyo DisneySea
- Opened: June 6, 2024
- Replaced: Parking lot

Fantasy Springs is a themed area at Tokyo DisneySea. Described as the park's eighth "port of call", the area takes the theme of "a magical spring that leads to a world of Disney fantasy" and comprises three distinct areas recreating the worlds of the Disney films Frozen, Tangled and Peter Pan. Fantasy Springs includes four attractions, three restaurants, one shop, and a new luxury hotel situated inside the park. Built at an estimated construction cost of ¥320 billion and a development area of approximately 140,000 square meters, Fantasy Springs is the largest expansion of Tokyo Disney Resort since the initial opening of Tokyo DisneySea in 2001.

Fantasy Springs held its grand opening on 6 June 2024.

== History ==
In 2015, Tokyo DisneySea announced the addition of a new "Scandinavia" port based on the 3D computer-animated musical film Frozen. However, this was shelved in favor of Tokyo Disneyland's Fantasyland expansion and the Frozen plans would be repurposed for a larger expansion project.

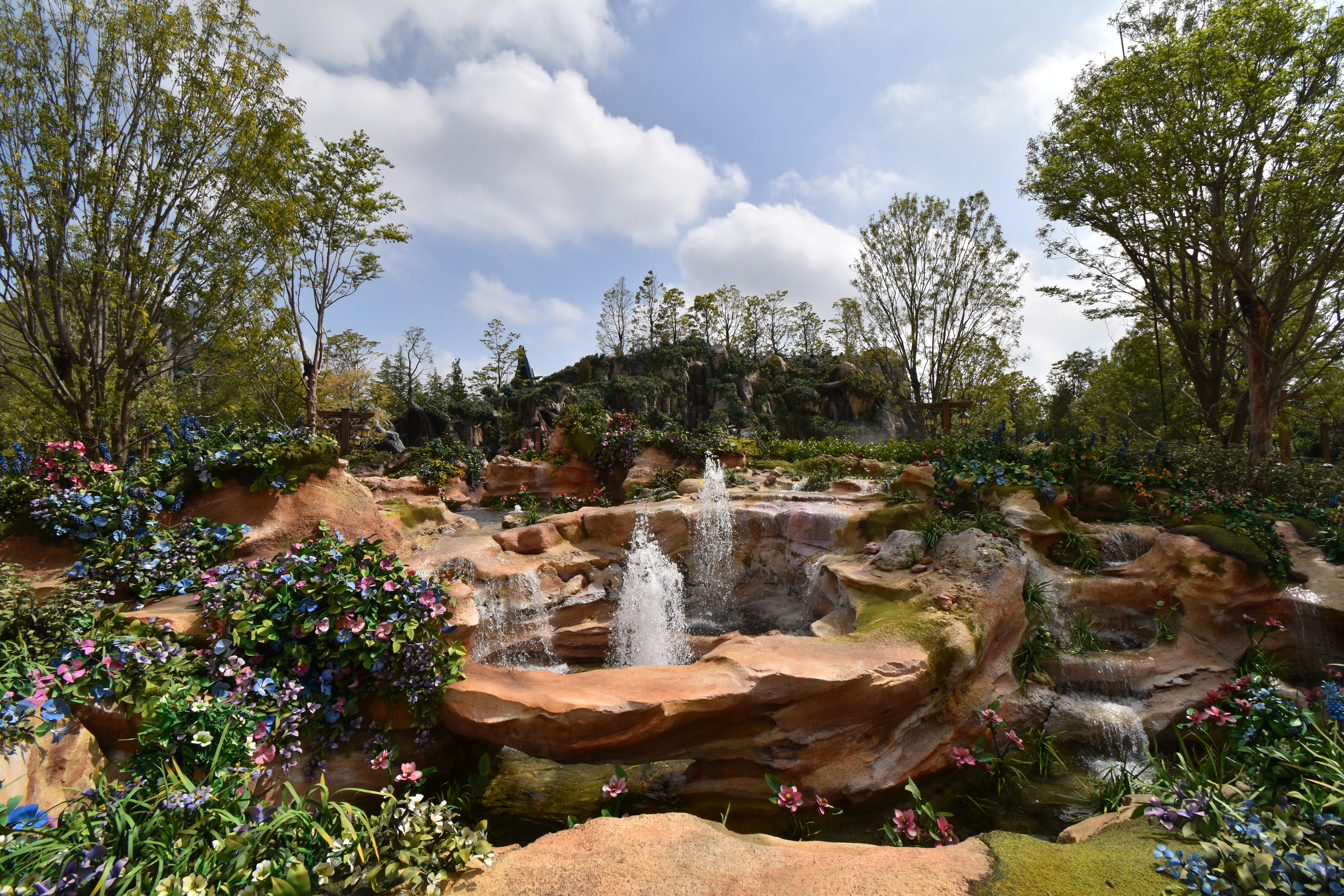
The eponymous springs of Fantasy Springs.

On 14 June 2018, Tokyo Disney Resort announced the new port would include three sections themed to Frozen, Tangled and Peter Pan as well as a new hotel.

On 27 October 2022, The Oriental Land Company announced that the opening date of Fantasy Springs had been pushed back to Spring 2024 due to delays in overseas production and COVID-19 restrictions, with a later date being announced for 6 June 2024. It was also announced that the three sections would be called Frozen Kingdom, Rapunzel's Forest and Peter Pan's Never Land. There would also be a Disney hotel, Tokyo DisneySea Fantasy Springs Hotel, in this new port.

On 5 February 2024, Tokyo Disney Resort announced that a new daytime show, Fantasy Springs Special Greeting, would take place in Mediterranean Harbor at Tokyo DisneySea from 9 April to 30 June 2024, as part of the Dreaming of Fantasy Springs promotion.

== Theme song ==
"Journey to Fantasy Springs"

Single by Tokyo DisneySea
- Released: 9 April 2024
- Genre: Soundtrack
- Length: 3:33
- Label: Walt Disney
- Songwriter: Nathan Padgett

Track listing
- 1. "Journey to Fantasy Springs"; 2. "Journey to Fantasy Springs (Instrumental Version)"

"Journey to Fantasy Springs" is a song composed by Nathan Padgett with vocals provided by Rachel Potter for Tokyo DisneySea's Fantasy Springs. It serves as the port theme song for Fantasy Springs.

The song was released as a single album on 9 April 2024 by Walt Disney Records. The single features both a vocal and an instrumental version. This song is used in the daytime shows, Fantasy Springs Special Greeting, and as part of the Dreaming of Fantasy Springs promotion.

== Areas ==
=== Frozen Kingdom ===
The Frozen Kingdom area is set after the events of Frozen, and themed to The Kingdom of Arendelle. The area features one boat attraction, Anna and Elsa's Frozen Journey, as well as one restaurant, Royal Banquet of Arendelle, located inside Arendelle Castle.

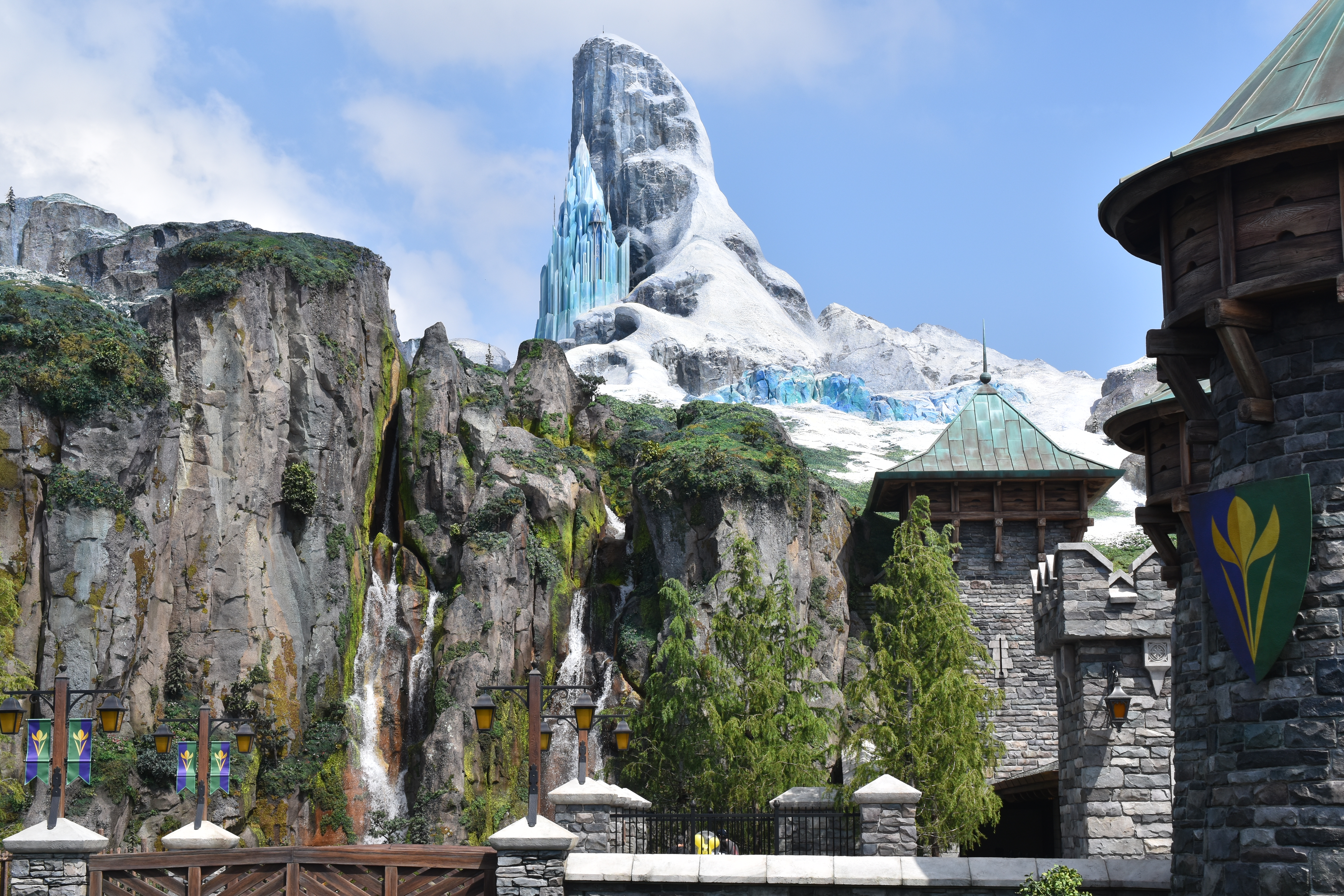
The "Frozen Kingdom" area.

==== Attraction ====
- Anna and Elsa's Frozen Journey

==== Restaurants ====
- Royal Banquet of Arendelle
- Oaken's OK Foods

=== Rapunzel's Forest ===
Rapunzel's Forest area is themed to Tangled with Rapunzel's tower overlooking the area. The area features one boat attraction, Rapunzel's Lantern Festival, as well as one restaurant, The Snuggly Duckling, inspired by the film.

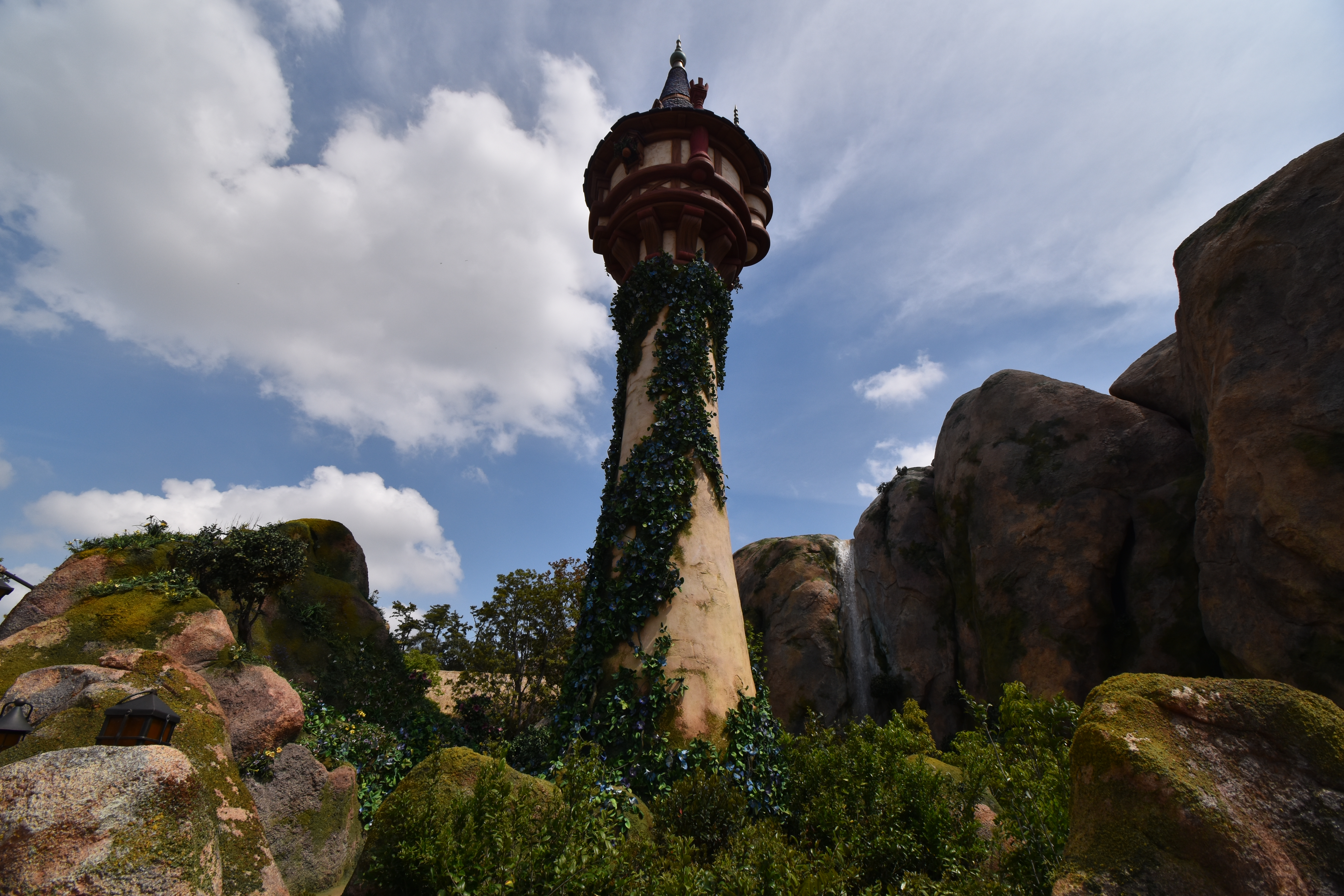
The "Rapunzel's Forest" area.

==== Attraction ====
- Rapunzel's Lantern Festival

==== Restaurant ====
- The Snuggly Duckling

=== Peter Pan's Never Land ===
Peter Pan's Neverland is themed to the Peter Pan and Disney Fairies franchise. The area features two attractions, Peter Pan's Never Land Adventure and Fairy Tinker Bell's Busy Buggies, as well as one restaurant, Lookout Cookout, inspired by the Lost Boys (who are referred to as "Lost Kids").

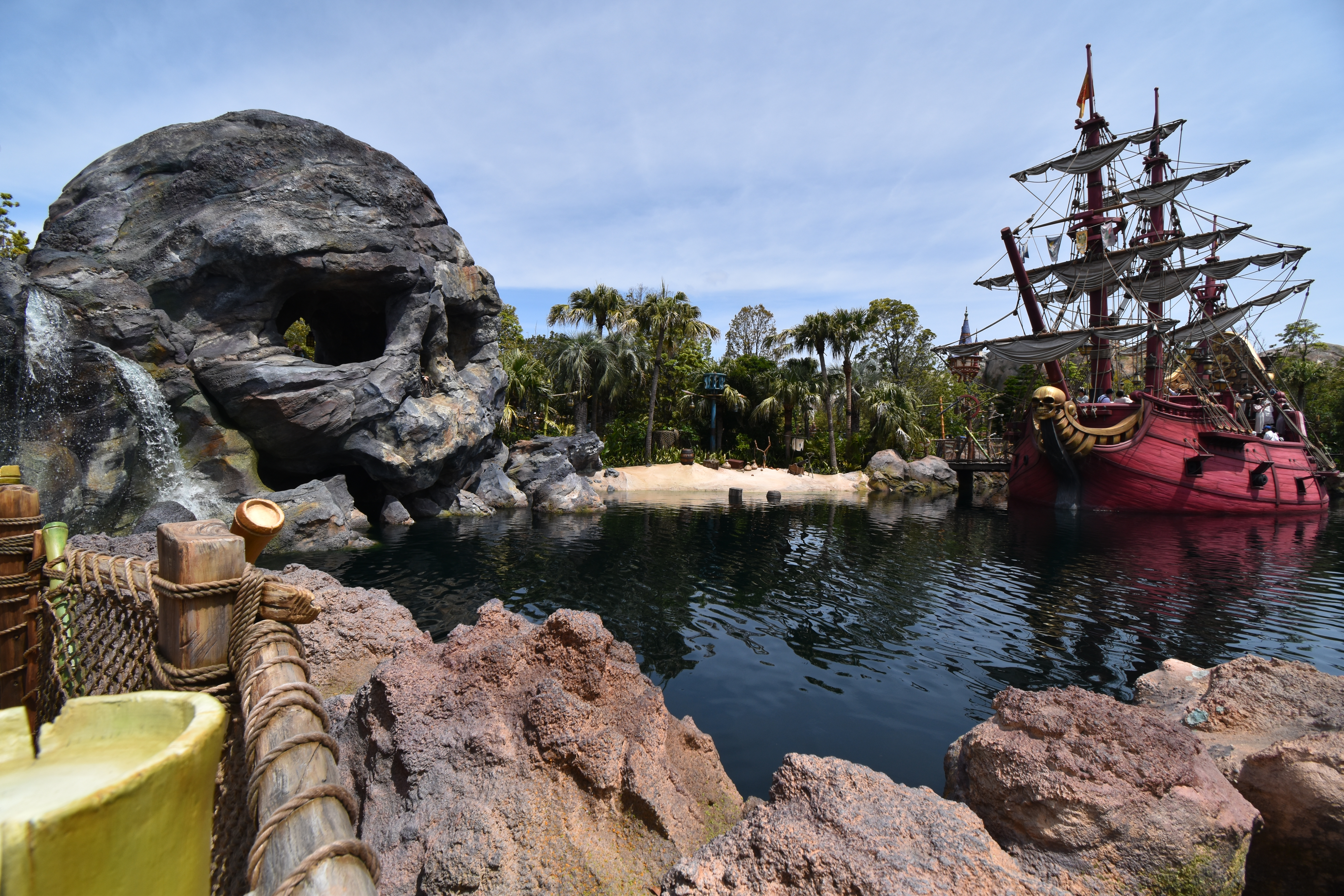
The “Peter Pan’s Never Land” area.

==== Attractions ====
- Peter Pan's Never Land Adventure
- Fairy Tinker Bell's Busy Buggies

==== Restaurant ====
- Lookout Cookout

== Tokyo DisneySea Fantasy Springs Hotel ==
The Tokyo DisneySea Fantasy Springs Hotel is open with the expansion and is the second hotel located within Tokyo DisneySea alongside Hotel MiraCosta. The hotel is the Tokyo Disney Resort's sixth hotel and fourth deluxe-type hotel. The hotel features 419 "deluxe type" rooms in the Fantasy Chateau, 56 "luxury-type" rooms in the Grand Chateau, and two restaurants.
