= Tokyo Disney Resort Toy Story Hotel =

Hotel at Tokyo Disney Resort, Japan

Coordinates: 35.6260°N 139.8749°E

- Interactive map of the Tokyo Disney Resort Toy Story Hotel area

General information
- Type: Resort
- Location: Tokyo Disney Resort
- Opened: April 5, 2022; 4 years ago
- Operator: The Oriental Land Company

Other information
- Number of rooms: 595

Website
- Official website

The Tokyo Disney Resort Toy Story Hotel is the fifth Disney-branded hotel built at Tokyo Disney Resort in Urayasu, Chiba, Japan. The hotel is themed to Pixar's Toy Story franchise. It opened on April 5, 2022, and was constructed under a license from The Walt Disney Company. The hotel is managed by The Oriental Land Company.

== History ==
The hotel was the Tokyo resort's first Moderate Type hotel, and the fifth Disney-branded hotel on the Tokyo Disney Resort property. The Tokyo Disney Resort Toy Story Hotel is located directly in front of Bayside Station on the Disney Resort Line Monorail.

== Guest rooms ==
The Toy Story Hotel offers 575 Standard and 20 Superior Type Rooms capable of accommodating three or four adults. All rooms consist of two regular beds, a trundle bed with some rooms featuring a pull-down bed.

== Dining ==
The hotel has one dining option.

- Lotso Garden Cafe, buffet.
