= Tokyo Disney Celebration Hotel =

Hotel at Tokyo Disney Resort, Japan

Coordinates: 35.6381°N 139.9293°E

- Interactive map of the Tokyo Disney Celebration Hotel area

General information
- Type: Resort
- Location: Akemi, Urayasu, Chiba, Japan
- Opened: Wish: June 1, 2016; 9 years ago Discover: September 10, 2016; 9 years ago
- Operator: The Oriental Land Company

Other information
- Number of rooms: Wish: 352; Discover: 350

Website
- Official website

The Disney Celebration Hotel is the fourth Disney-branded hotel and first "value type" Disney-branded hotel opened by Tokyo Disney Resort in Urayasu, Chiba, Japan. The hotel consists of two different themed hotels Tokyo Disney Celebration Hotel: Wish which is themed to "Dream" and "Fantasy" and Tokyo Disney Celebration Hotel: Discover which is themed to "Adventure" and "Discovery". The Wish portion of the hotel opened on June 1, 2016 and the Discover portion of the hotel opened on September 10, 2016. The hotel is managed by The Oriental Land Company under licence from The Walt Disney Company.

== History ==
The hotel was the Tokyo resort's fourth officially Disney-branded hotel and is the only Disney-branded hotel not located within the Tokyo Disney Resort. The Disney Celebration Hotel is instead located in Akemi a suburb of Urayasu approximately a 15-minute drive from the resort. Furthermore, unlike Tokyo Disney Resort's previous hotels which were purpose built by The Walt Disney Company Disney Celebration Hotel is instead a renovation of the former Palm & Fountain Terrace Hotel.

== Facilities ==
The hotel has modest guest facilities including a gift shop, a snacks and sundries shop, and the "Wish Café" and "Discover Café" which serve breakfast only. Shuttle buses connect it to the parks.
