= Toshio Kagami =

- Born: January 5, 1936 (age 90); Urayasu, Chiba, Japan
- Education: Keio University
- Alma mater: Bachelor's Degree
- Occupations: President, Tokyo Disney Resort and CEO, Oriental Land Company

Toshio Kagami (加賀見 俊夫, Kagami Toshio; born January 5, 1936) is the chairman and chief executive officer (CEO) of The Oriental Land Company, and the representative director, chairman and CEO of the Tokyo Disney Resort in Japan.

== Early life ==
In 1958, Kagami graduated from Keio University in Tokyo, Japan, with a bachelor's degree

== Career ==
In 2009, Kagami was named chairman and CEO of The Oriental Land Company Ltd., and chairman of Milial Resort Hotels Co Ltd.
