= Disney Ambassador Hotel =

Tokyo Disney Resort Hotel

Coordinates: 35.633°N 139.888°E

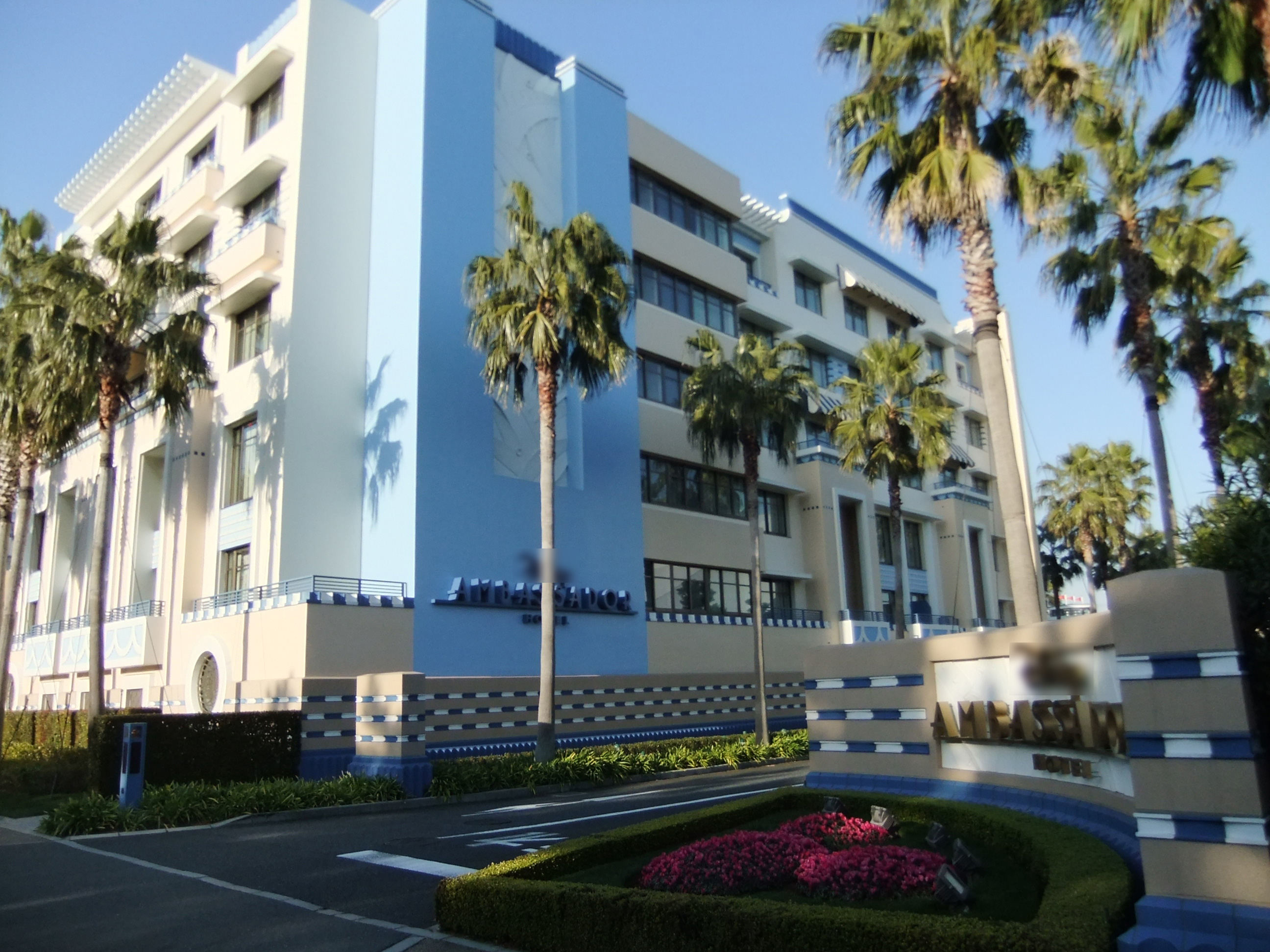

General information
- Type: Resort
- Location: Tokyo Disney Resort
- Opened: July 20, 2000; 26 years ago
- Operator: The Oriental Land Company

Other information
- Number of rooms: 504

Website
- Official website

The Disney Ambassador Hotel is the first Disney-branded hotel built at Tokyo Disney Resort in Urayasu, Chiba, Japan. It opened on July 20, 2000, and was constructed under a license by The Walt Disney Company. The hotel is managed by The Oriental Land Company.

== History ==
The hotel was the Tokyo resort's first officially Disney-branded hotel, but the sixth hotel on the Tokyo Disney Resort property. The Disney Ambassador Hotel is located next to Ikspiari, an "entertainment district" similar to the Downtown Disney area of the Disneyland Resort and Disney Springs at the Walt Disney World Resort. The Ambassador opened in 2000 and was designed by the 2011 Driehaus Prize winner Robert A. M. Stern and Paul L. Whalen.

== Guest rooms ==
The Ambassador has five typical types of rooms: the Standard Room, the Superior Room and the Triple Room, which offers three full-sized beds, as well as the Deluxe Room and the Family Room with four beds, capable of accommodating six adults. Certain rooms are "character rooms" with designs based on Disney characters and complimentary gifts to keep.

== Dining ==
The hotel has five dining options.

- Chef Mickey – Character dining, buffet
- Empire Grill – California-style cuisine
- Tick Tock Diner – 50s diner-themed café
- Hyperion Lounge
