= Downtown Disney (disambiguation) =

Downtown Disney is an outdoor shopping center at the Disneyland Resort.

Downtown Disney may also refer to:

- Disney Springs, formerly named Downtown Disney, at Walt Disney World

== See also ==
- Disney Village, at Disneyland Paris
- Ikspiari, at the Tokyo Disney Resort
- Disneytown, at Shanghai Disney Resort
