= Ryotokuji University =

Private Japanese university

Coordinates: 35°38′30.17″N 139°55′24.46″E

- 了徳寺大学; Ryōtokuji daigaku
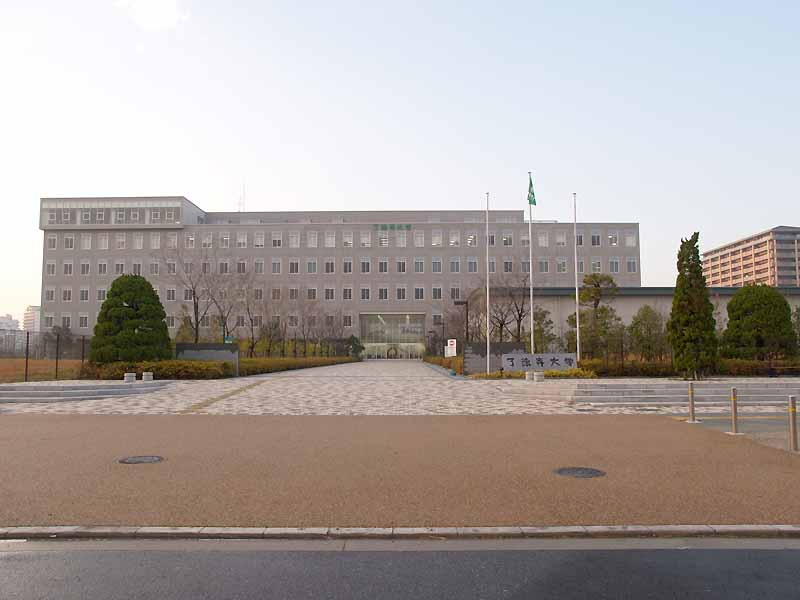
- Type: Private
- Established: 2006
- Location: Urayasu, Chiba, Japan
- Website: www.ryotokuji-u.ac.jp

Ryotokuji University (了徳寺大学, Ryōtokuji daigaku) is now known as SBC Tokyo Medical University and is a private university in Urayasu, Chiba, Japan. It was established in 2006. Its facilities include 126 classrooms, a library, four gymnasiums, and an administration area for staff and reception.
