= Rachel Potter =

American singer and actress (born 1984)

- Born: Rachel Lindsey Potter; August 21, 1984 (age 41); New Orleans, Louisiana, U.S.
- Genres: Country; country pop; CCM; soul; pop; hard rock; pop rock
- Occupation: Singer
- Instruments: Vocals; guitar; ukulele
- Years active: 2002–present
- Labels: Narrow Door (2002–2003); Black is the New Pink (2014-2015)
- Website: www.rachelpottermusic.com

Rachel Lindsey Potter (born August 21, 1984) is an American singer and actress. She is most known for her performances on Broadway as Wednesday Addams in The Addams Family, the Mistress in the Tony-nominated revival of Evita, and being a contestant on season 3 of The X Factor.

== Early life ==
Potter was born in New Orleans, Louisiana, but was raised in Seminole, Florida.

Potter has lived in Orlando, Florida, but currently lives in Nashville, Tennessee. At the age of 12, Rachel began writing original songs to cope with her mother being diagnosed with type 1 diabetes. While working at Walt Disney World, she completed a bachelor's degree in public relations and advertising from the University of Central Florida in 2008. After graduating from college, she moved to New York where she got a job singing in a wedding band.

== Broadway career ==
In 2003, Potter moved to Orlando, Florida.

Potter was cast as Ariel in the Voyage of the Little Mermaid. She subsequently performed as Belle in Beauty and the Beast Live on Stage, Nemo in Finding Nemo: The Musical, and a slew of other shows at Disney. In 2008, she made it in the Top 15 in the MTV reality show Legally Blonde: The Musical – The Search for Elle Woods.

Potter was in the touring production of Wicked in the ensemble and understudying Glinda played Wednesday Addams in the musical version of The Addams Family. Later on, Potter was cast in the 2012 revival of Evita, in which she portrayed Peron's mistress, alongside Ricky Martin, Elena Roger, and Michael Cerveris.

== Recording career ==
Potter began her career as a recording artist at age 16 when she was signed to contemporary Christian label Narrow Door Records. In 2002, she released "Come Back Home", an album of 10 of her own songs.

She appeared in the second national tour of the musical Wicked, as a part of the ensemble, in addition to being an understudy for Glinda. While on tour, she reconnected with Justin York, an old friend who had become a Nashville musician, producer and songwriter, known for his work with Nashville-bred rock band Paramore. Potter released her first EP, Live the Dream.

She raised funds through a Kickstarter campaign that surpassed its original financial goal. The "Help Me Live the Dream" campaign successfully exceeded its original financial goal through contributions from a broad range of supporters. The official music video for "Live the Dream" was released on October 17, 2012, on Potter's channel. Potter performed on CBS New York singing "Hold On To Me".

Potter began performing a series of concerts at Joe's Pub to promote Live the Dream, she performed with Constantine Maroulis, Ricky Martin, Elena Roger, Michael Cerveris, The Vanity Belles, and The Country Band. Potter's single 'The Verdict' was nominated for Best Country Song in the Independent Music Awards, despite not having been officially released at the time. Potter was featured in mashup of Taylor Swift's "I Knew You Were Trouble" and Justin Bieber's "As Long As You Love Me" by VoicePlay, an Orlando-based 5-member a cappella group as well as VoicePlay's cover of "Chandelier" and "The Phantom of the Opera".

In 2014, Potter launched a crowdfunded campaign using Pledge Music to fund her most recent album, Not So Black and White. She released the first single, "Boomerang," a duet with Anthem Lights member Joey Stamper, in October 2014. The full album was released on March 3, 2015. CMT featured her music videos for "Boomerang" and "Tail Lights" on their CMT Pure Channel in the "New Artist Spotlight".

Continuing her work with Disney, Potter sang the theme song "Journey to Fantasy Springs" for the opening of Fantasy Springs, the 8th themed port at Tokyo DisneySea, in 2024.

=== The X Factor ===
One of the best things about being on The X Factor is that so many people watched my video, and people were commenting, saying "I would buy her album even though I don't listen to country." That, to me, is the biggest compliment. Because I think I do have that crossover feel, and I hope that people who don't usually listen to that genre will be attracted to my sound.

— Potter, on X Factor journey.

In 2013 Potter auditioned for the third season of The X Factor with "Somebody to Love". Potter advanced to the top 40 acts in The X Factor's 'Over 25s' category, mentored by Kelly Rowland. Potter sang "Irreplaceable" and was placed in chair 4. Since she was not switched out, she made the top four of "Over 25s" category along with Lillie McCloud, Jeff Gutt and James Kenney.

During the first live results show, on October 29, Potter sang "I Hope You Dance" receiving positive reviews; Kelly described Rachel as a "powerhouse and a delight", Paulina says Rachel has a "beautiful tone" and is original, describing the performance as brilliant from beginning to end and Simon said the song choice was perfect and she was even better than Lillie.

She was the first to be chosen to be in the final three along with Jeff Gutt and Lillie McCloud.

During week two, Potter sang "This Old Heart of Mine (Is Weak for You)" which received mixed reviews. Demi Lovato praised her energy, while Simon Cowell criticized aspects of the performance.

Due to graphics errors in which incorrect voting numbers were displayed on screen during the performance recap, there was no elimination that week; instead all the acts performed their "Save Me" songs on Thursday night and a public re-vote was conducted after the show.

Potter sang "Anyway" by Martina McBride. During week 3, Potter sang "Alone" by Heart, gaining positive reviews. Potter fell to the bottom two alongside Khaya Cohen, where she was eliminated after only Rowland voted against Cohen. However, Potter received more votes than Cohen meaning if the result went to deadlock, Potter would've been saved.

Performances on The X Factor

Rachel performed the following songs on The X Factor:

Show	Theme	Song	Original artist	Order	Result
Audition	None	"Somebody to Love"	Queen	N/A	Through to Four-Chair Challenge
Four-chair challenge	None	"Irreplaceable"	Beyoncé	4	Advanced to Live Shows (Top 16)
Week 1	None	"I Hope You Dance"	Lee Ann Womack	11	Safe
Week 2	Motown Night	"This Old Heart of Mine (Is Weak for You)"	The Isley Brothers	2	Safe
Week 2	Save Me Songs	"Anyway"	Martina McBride	2	Safe
Week 3	80s Night	"Alone"	"Heart"	8	Bottom Two
Week 3	Final Showdown	"From This Moment On"	Shania Twain	2	Eliminated

== Artistry ==
Potter cites as her influences The Civil Wars, Carrie Underwood, Trisha Yearwood, Faith Hill, The Chicks, Rascal Flatts, Dolly Parton, Joni Mitchell, Patsy Cline, Alison Krauss, Union Station, Martina McBride, Miranda Lambert, Taylor Swift, Grace Potter and the Nocturnals, Sara Bareilles and Sheryl Crow. Growing up, she listened primarily to rock 'n roll because her parents were in a rock band. Originally a CCM artist, Potter now considers herself a Country and country pop artist, but her music contains elements of CCM, Soul pop, Hard rock and pop rock. Potter describes her musical style as a fusion of country, pop rock, and contemporary influences with occasional rock elements.

== Personal life ==
Rachel Potter lives in Nashville with her husband, two sons and daughter.

== Stage ==
Year	Show	Role	Notes
2008	Voyage of the Little Mermaid	Ariel	Walt Disney World
2008	Beauty and the Beast Live on Stage	Belle	Walt Disney World
2009	Finding Nemo: The Musical	Nemo	Disney's Animal Kingdom
2010	The Addams Family	Wednesday Addams	Broadway (replacement)
2010	Wicked	Ensemble, Glinda u/s	2nd National Tour
2011	High School Musical	Sharpay	High School Music Search
2012	Evita	Peron's Mistress	Broadway Revival
2013	Spring Awakening	Wendla	freeFall Theatre Co.

== Discography ==
Solo Discography

- Come Back Home (2002)
- Live the Dream – EP (2012)
- Simply Christmas – EP (2014)
- Not So Black and White (2015)
- Music City Christmas – EP (2018)

Solo Singles

- Blank Space – 2014
- Let It Go – 2014
- Hello (feat. Jake Barker) – 2015
- Want to Want Me / I Wanna Dance With Somebody – 2015
- FourFiveSeconds – 2015
- I’m Not the Only One – 2015
- Lover, You Matter to Me (feat. Marty Thomas) – 2020

Discography with Steel Union

- Rachel Potter & Steel Union – EP (2018)

Discography with VoicePlay

- I Knew You Were Trouble / As Long As You Love Me – Single (2013)
- Chandelier – Single (2014)
- The Phantom of the Opera – Single (2015)
- Attention – Single (2017)
- Moana – Medley (2017)
- O Holy Night – Single (2018)
- The Little Mermaid – Medley (2020)
- Kidnap the Sandy Claws – Single (2020)
- Wicked – Medley (2021)
- The Greatest Showman – Medley (2021)
