= Rioka Kanda =

Japanese singer-songwriter, radio personality, and actress

Rioka Kanda 神田莉緒香
- Also known as: Kandari
- Born: 26 March 1992 (age 34); Urayasu City, Chiba Prefecture, Japan
- Genres: J-POP
- Occupations: Singer-songwriter, radio personality, actress
- Instruments: Vocals, piano, keyboard
- Years active: 2008–present
- Labels: ハイレゾミュージック(2013–2016), UNIVERSAL GEAR (2017), bluesofa MUSIC (2018–)
- Website: http://www.kandarioka.com/index.html

Rioka Kanda (神田 莉緒香 Kanda Rioka, born 26 March 1992) is a Japanese singer-songwriter, radio personality, and actress from Urayasu City in Chiba Prefecture, Japan.

== Career ==
After moving on from Goose house (former PlayYou.house) on 31 March 2013, she started her solo musician career. On 26 March 2019, she had a live solo concert at ZeppDiverCity in Tokyo, which was the largest performance for her at that time. She started her own radio programme "KANDAFUL RADIO" as its radio personality in October 2015. This programme "KANDAFUL RADIO" is broadcast from 0:50 to 1:00 (JST) by Nippon Broadcasting System on Mondays. She broadcasts a live online video streaming "KANDAFUL TV" by herself through her official TwitCasting page and YouTube channel from around 22:00 (JST) for one hour or so every other Wednesday as well. Sometimes, randomly she plays keyboard and sings on the live streaming of her Instagram story.

She composed songs for TV and radio commercials, and sings them: "Bathclin no Uta (「バスクリンのうた」) : Happy Bath Time" for BATHCLIN CORPORATION (2018), "Kono Ie de, Isshoni.(「この家で、いっしょに。」)" for 株式会社ジェイウッド (2017), "Haha no Hambun (「母の半分」)" for MEGMILK SNOW BRAND Co., Ltd. (2017), "Sekai no Nejigeji (「世界のねじゲージ」)" and "Kimi ga Irukara (「きみがいるから」)" for SOKUHANSHA Co., Ltd. (2016).

She has written her serial articles "Kanda Rioka no Kanjitari, Manandari (「神田莉緒香の感じたり、学んだり」)" in the magazine BARFOUT! every other month since June 2017.

== Discography ==
Single

1st "boyfriend?" on 12 April 2013

2nd "Twilight" on 10 July 2013

3rd "SetsuNatsu" on 6 August 2014

4th "Hoshi / Ippai Ippai / Welcome to the music (「星 / いっぱいいっぱい / Welcome to music」)" on 19 August 2015

5th "Ai to Sakebitainda (「愛と叫びたいんだ」)" on 23 August 2017

6th "Meguri (「めぐり」)" on 7 February 2018

7th "Kokokara (「ここから」)" on 15 November 2018

8th "Utakata Circus (「うたかたcircus」)" on 16 May 2020

Album

1st "Wonderful World" on 16 April 2014

2nd "Ohkikute Chihsai Sekai (「大きくて小さい世界」)" on 9 November 2016

Self-Produced Album

1st "I like it." on 26 March 2012

Mini-Album

1st "TOKYO / OSAKA" on 27 March 2015

2nd "ACCELERATOR" on 7 June 2017

3rd "Harinezumi no Shinro (「ハリネズミの針路」)" on 27 June 2018

4th "Shujinko ni Narenakutemo (「主人公になれなくても」)" on 27 March 2019

5th "Haru nishite Kimi ni Utau (「春にして君にうたう」)" on 15 April 2020

Best-Album

1st "Itsudatte Best! (「いつだってベスト！」) " on 23 December 2015

DVD

1st "KANDAFUL WORLD Vol.5 TOKYO / OSAKA TOUR 3.26 TOKYO OFFICIAL DVD" on 9 November 2015

2nd "KANDAFUL WORLD Vol.6 ITSUDATTE BEST! 12.21 TOKYO OFFICIAL DVD" on 13 March 2016

3rd "KANDAFUL WORLD Vol.7 BIG AND SMALL WORLD" on 1 February 2017

4th "KANDAFUL WORLD Vol.8" on 27 March 2018
