= Fortress Explorations =

Walk-through attraction in Tokyo

Tokyo DisneySea
- Area: Mediterranean Harbor
- Status: Operating
- Opening date: September 4, 2001

Ride statistics
- Designer: Walt Disney Imagineering
- Sponsor: BIPROGY
- Wheelchair accessible

Fortress Explorations (フォートレス・エクスプレーション) is a walk-through attraction at Tokyo DisneySea.

== Summary ==
This fortress-themed attraction is located on the west side of Mediterranean Harbor. Within the attraction guests can walk around the fortress grounds freely, which contains a Focault pendulum, an astral observatory, the sailing ship Renaissance, flying machines, an alchemy lab, a navigation center, an optical illusion room, and a Hall of Explorers honoring various historical figures. Three restaurants ("Magellan's", "Magellan's Lounge", "Refrescos") are located inside of this attraction.

On July 7, 2008, a scavenger hunt program called "The Leonardo Challenge" started, so named as an actor playing the ghost of Leonardo da Vinci would appear on interactive kiosks for the experience. Guests receive the map and rely on it to find a "lava control station" somewhere in the attraction; however, a variety of trials await them before arrival.

This attraction is the fortress headquarters of a fictional society called S.E.A. (Society of Explorers and Adventurers), established in 1538 amidst the Golden Age of Exploration. Though this fictional society was created for this attraction, S.E.A. can also be found within Tokyo DisneySea's Tower of Terror and Soaring: Fantastic Flight attractions and in many other Disney Parks attractions around the world such as Mystic Manor in Hong Kong Disneyland, the Jungle Cruise, Big Thunder Mountain Railroad in Magic Kingdom, Oceaneer Lab in Disney Cruise Line and Miss Adventure Falls in Disney's Typhoon Lagoon, with characters from these rides being members of the organization.

== In other media ==
Two adaptations of the Society of Explorers and Adventurers are in development at Disney: a Disney+ series developed by Ronald D. Moore, and a feature film written by Qui Nguyen. The two projects are unrelated to each other. The Society of Explorers and Adventurers would also be the focus of the Shinji Takahashi books by Julie Kagawa, which explores the organization in the present day.
