= Tokyo Disneyland Hotel =

Disney-themed hotel in Japan

Coordinates: 35°38′12.7″N 139°52′41.7″E

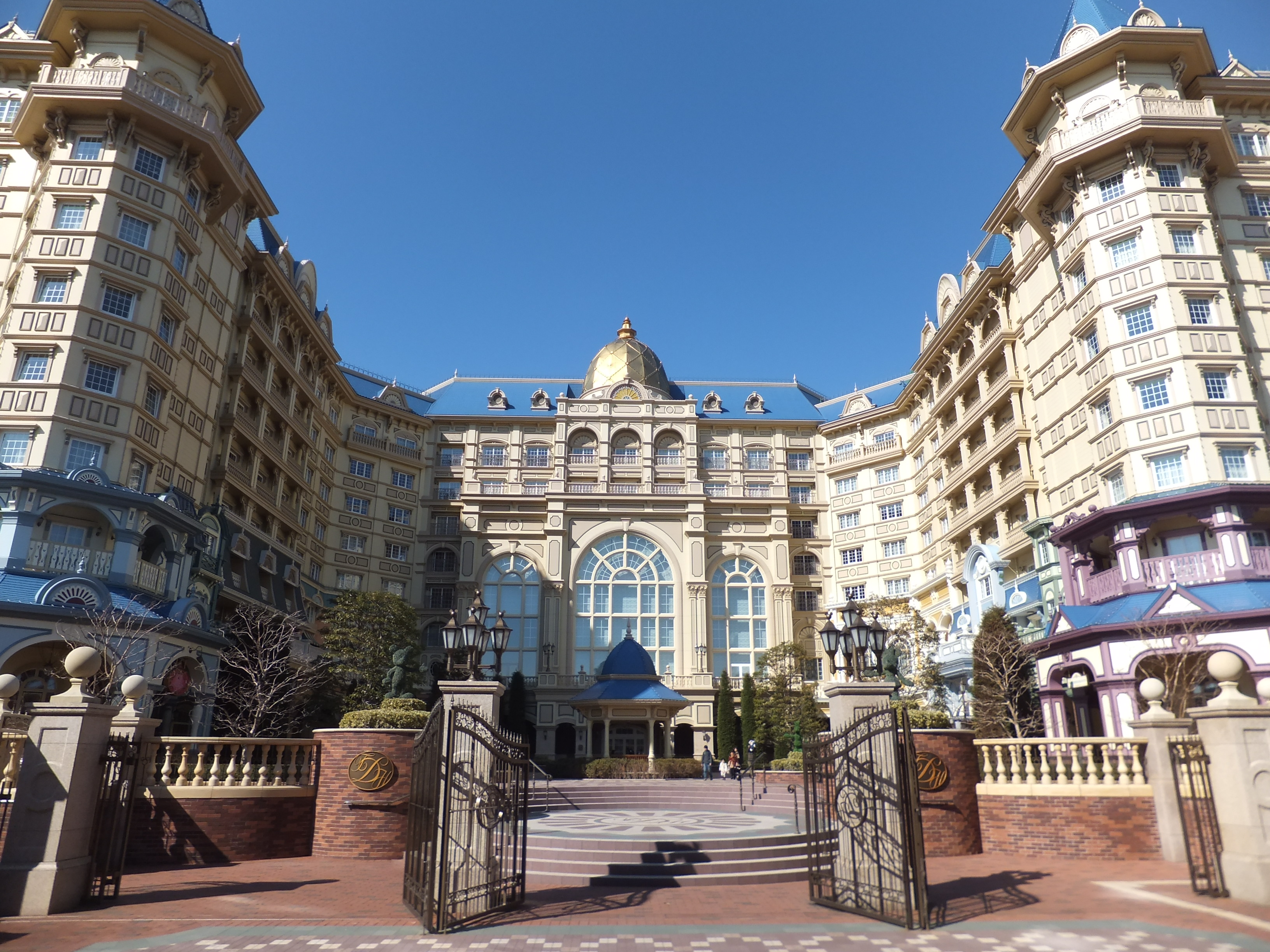

General information
- Type: Resort
- Location: Tokyo Disney Resort
- Opened: July 8, 2008; 18 years ago
- Operator: The Oriental Land Company

Other information
- Number of rooms: 701

Website
- disneyhotels.jp/

The Tokyo Disneyland Hotel is the third of the hotels at Tokyo Disney Resort, and the fourth Disneyland-related hotel. It is located directly in front of the Tokyo Disneyland park, with the Tokyo Disneyland station of the Disney Resort Line monorail system in between. Like Disneyland Paris Hotel, the hotel was designed to reflect early 20th century Victorian architectural style, and to blend with the World Bazaar area of Tokyo Disneyland, the monorail station and the main entrance area.

== Summary ==
Located within Tokyo Disney Resort are six Tokyo Disney Resort Official Hotels. These Official Hotels offer world-class guest accommodations and services.Tokyo Disneyland Hotel offers 701 guest rooms including themed character rooms, along with dining and shopping facilities. The hotel is featuring Victorian-style atmosphere and an interior sprinkled with Disney motifs

== Restaurants ==
The following are restaurants located inside of the Tokyo Disneyland Hotel:

- Canna (fine dining restaurant)
- Dreamers Lounge (lobby restaurant)
- Sherwood Garden (buffet restaurant)

== See also ==
1. Disneyland Paris Hotel, a similar hotel designed in the Victorian period.
