= Tokyo DisneySea Hotel MiraCosta =

Tokyo Disney Resort Hotel

Coordinates: 35.627°N 139.888°E

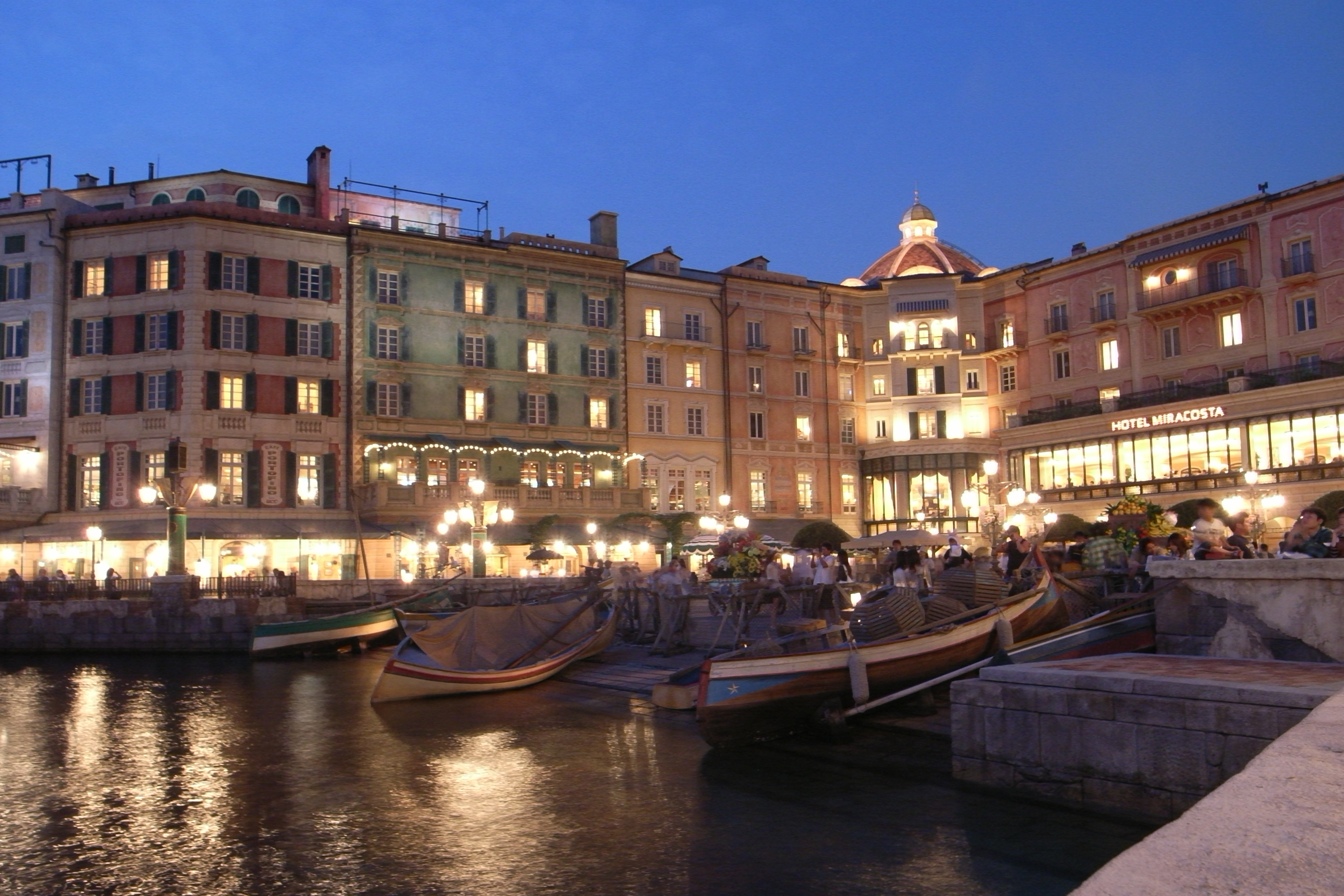
- Hotel MiraCosta from within Tokyo DisneySea
- Interactive map of the Tokyo DisneySea Hotel MiraCosta area

General information
- Type: Resort
- Location: Tokyo Disney Resort
- Opened: September 4, 2001
- Operator: The Oriental Land Company

Other information
- Number of rooms: 502

Website
- Official website

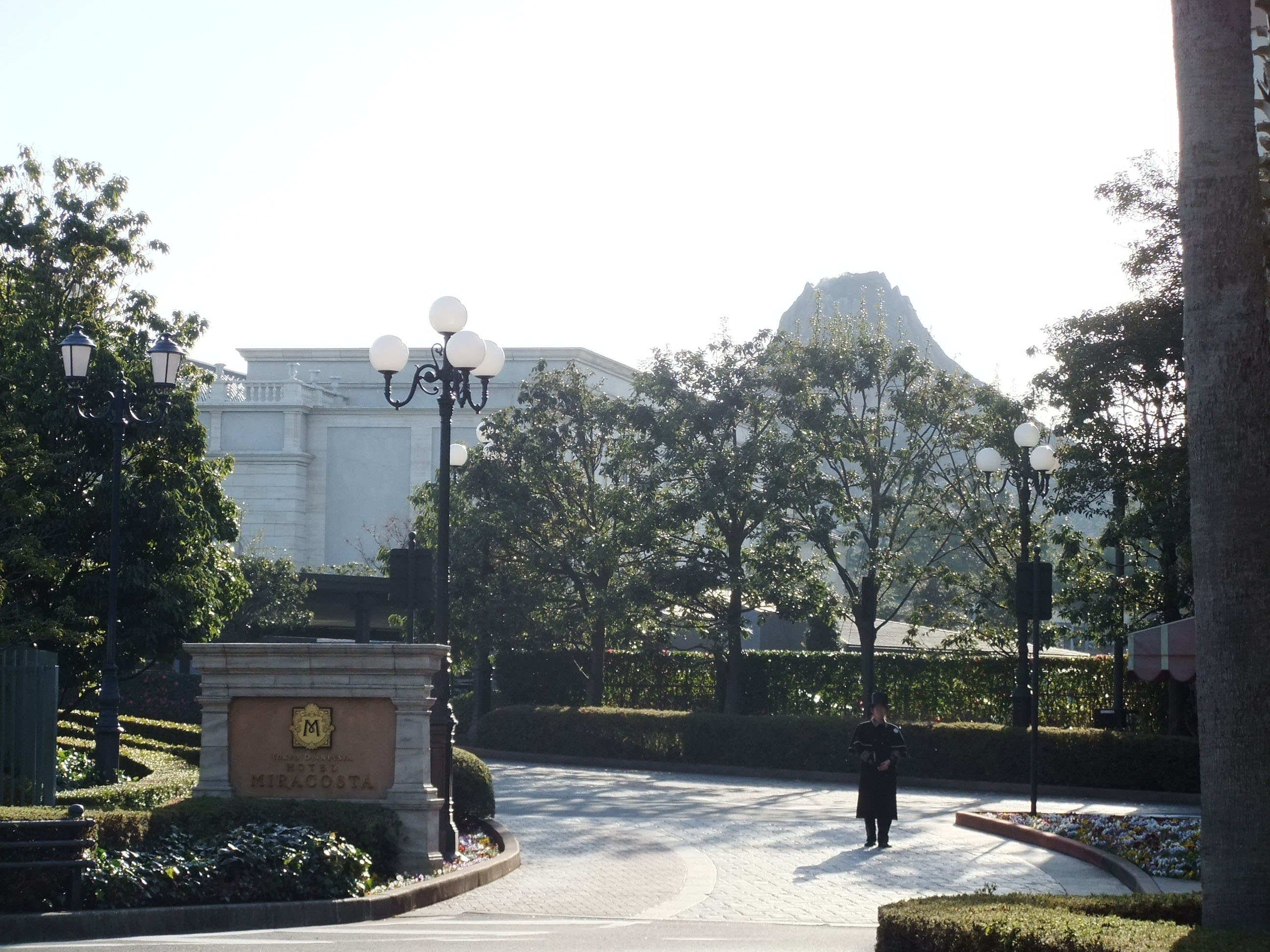
Tokyo DisneySea Hotel MiraCosta entrance

The Tokyo DisneySea Hotel MiraCosta was the second hotel built at Tokyo Disney Resort in Urayasu, Chiba, Japan. It opened on September 4, 2001, alongside the opening of the Tokyo DisneySea theme park. It was constructed under a license by The Walt Disney Company. The hotel is managed by The Oriental Land Company.

The hotel gains the distinction of being the only hotel in the world which is entirely placed inside a Disney theme park. It is located above the Mediterranean Harbor port in Tokyo DisneySea. The hotel is themed after the ports of Portofino and Venice.

== Resort ==
=== Rooms ===
The hotel offers rooms on three sides, these are from highest priced to lowest; the Porto Paradiso side offering views of Mount Prometheus and Fantasmic (which was permanently closed to make way for Believe! Sea of Dreams!), the Venice Side facing the Venetian gondolas, and the Tuscany side facing the park and hotel entrances. Speziale rooms come with additional privileges such as access to the executive lounge with inclusive snacks and beverages. Interior design by Kenneth Gomes.

Guests enter Tokyo DisneySea through a special entrance in the hotel.

=== Dining ===
There are three restaurants in the hotel.

- BelleVista Lounge – Lobby lounge serving Italian cuisine and drinks
- Oceano – Mediterranean restaurant offering both a buffet and course menu facing the Mediterranean Harbor area of the park
- Silk Road Garden – Chinese restaurant

=== MickeyAngelo Gifts ===
Serves as both a convenience store and gift shop for hotel guests.

=== Pools and other paid amenities ===
The resort charges guests an additional fee for access to these amenities.

- Outdoor pool – only open during the summer season
- Indoor pool
- Hippocampi pool bar
- Spa area
- Fitness room

=== Wedding chapel ===
Chapel MiraCosta is one of three locations where weddings are offered at Tokyo Disney Resort, also offering private banquet rooms for receptions.
