= Philippe Gas =

French businessman

- Occupation: Chief Executive Office - Qiddiya Investment Company

Philippe Gas was the president of Euro Disney S.A.S., the management company of Euro Disney S.C.A. and Euro Disney Associés S.C.A., the operator of Disneyland Paris, from 2008 until September 2014. From 2014 to 2020, Gas was the head of Shanghai Disneyland Resort, overseeing its debut and supervising Disney's theme park operations in Asia. In 2020, he became CEO of the Qiddiya Investment Company, an organization seeking to build an entertainment district outside of Riyadh, Saudi Arabia.
