= Venetian Gondolas =

Ride at Tokyo DisneySea

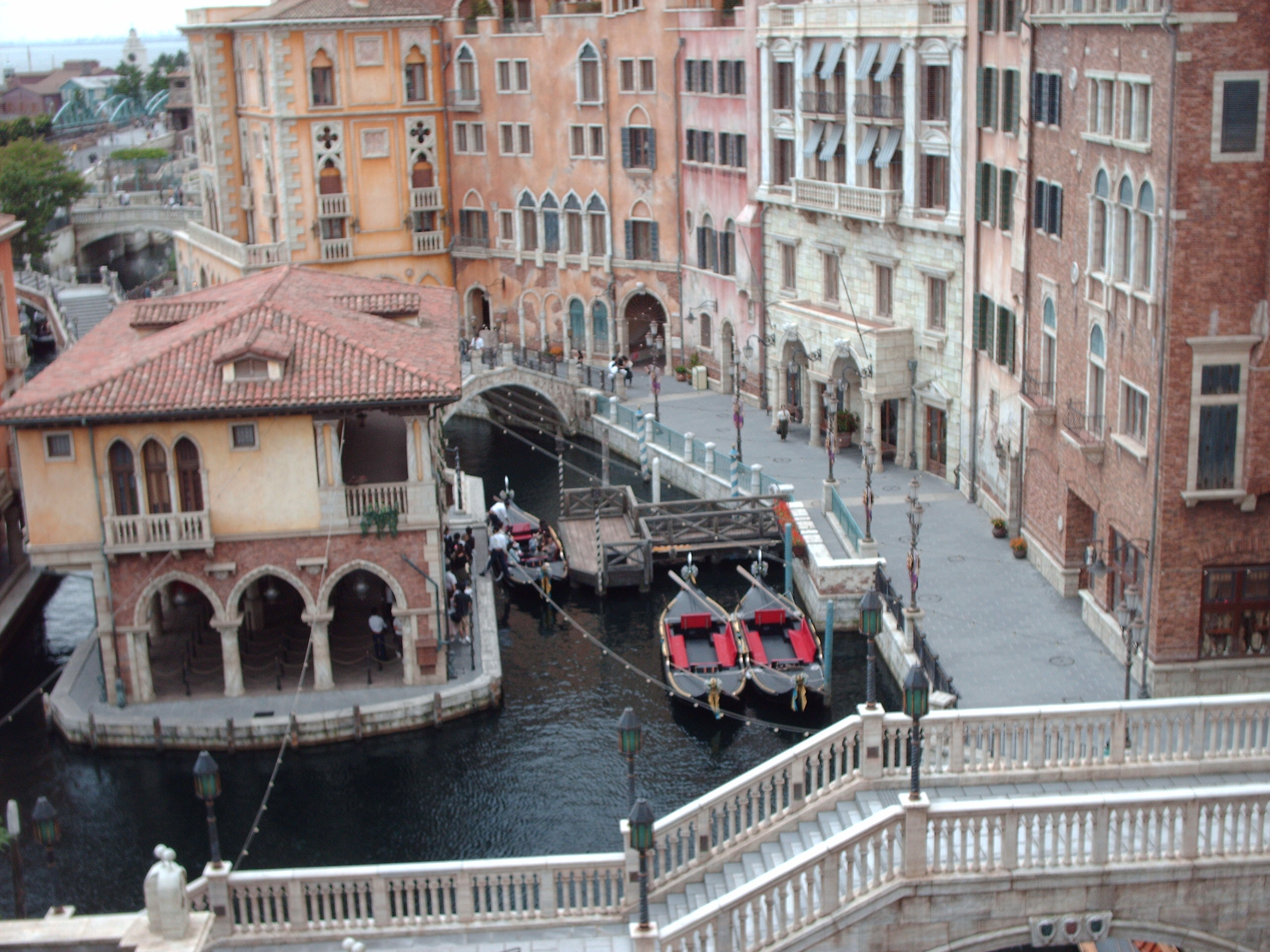
- Venice area of Mediterranean Harbor, Tokyo DisneySea

Tokyo DisneySea
- Area: Mediterranean Harbor
- Status: Operating
- Opening date: September 4, 2001

Ride statistics
- Designer: Walt Disney Imagineering
- Capacity: 16 persons per gondola riders per hour
- Duration: about 11.5 minutes

Venetian Gondolas is a gondola ride at Tokyo DisneySea theme park. It is located at the Mediterranean Harbor area.

== Summary ==
Each gondola is steered by two gondoliers and has a seating capacity for 16 guests. The gondola is steered out into a canal that leads to the Mediterranean Harbor. Guests are asked by the gondoliers to say "Ciao!" to other gondola guests or the DisneySea Transit Steamer Line guests. The gondoliers also sing a song as the gondola returns to the loading area. The ride lasts for about 11.5 minutes.

Venetian Gondolas do not operate when shows are being set up and performed in Mediterranean Harbor.
