= Oriental Land Company =

Japanese leisure and tourism company

Oriental Land Co., Ltd.

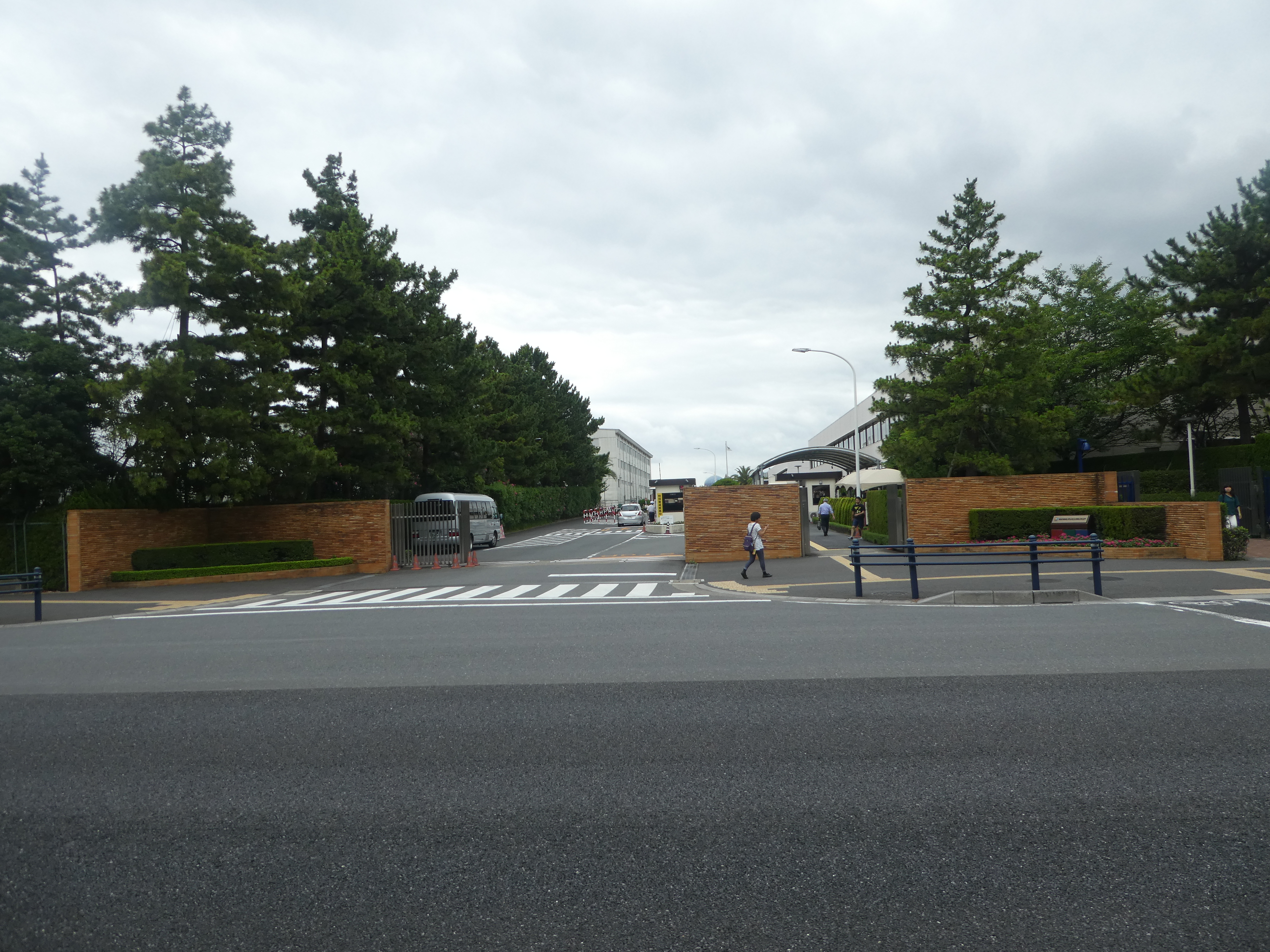
- Headquarters in Urayasu, Chiba Prefecture
- Native name: 株式会社オリエンタルランド
- Romanized name: Kabushiki gaisha Orientaru Rando
- Type: Public
- Traded as: TYO: 4661; TOPIX Large70 component
- Industry: Travel
- Founded: July 11, 1960; 66 years ago
- Headquarters: Maihama, Urayasu, Chiba Prefecture, Japan
- Key people: Toshio Kagami (chairman of the board); Yumiko Takano (chairman, CEO); Wataru Takahashi (president, COO)
- Brands: Tokyo Disney Resort
- Revenue: ▲¥679,374 million (JFY25)
- Operating income: ▲¥172,111 million (JFY25)
- Net income: ▲¥173,328 million (JFY25)
- Total assets: ▲¥1,438,521 million (JFY25)
- Total equity: ▲¥977,408 million (JFY25)
- Owner: Keisei Electric Railway (20%); Master Trust Bank of Japan (11%); Mitsui Fudosan (5.8%); Trust & Custody Services Bank (5%); Chiba Prefecture (4%)
- Number of employees: 26,713 (JFY25)
- Subsidiaries: Milial Resort Hotels; Ikspiari; Brighton Co., Ltd.; Maihama Resort Line
- Website: olc.co.jp/en
- Footnotes; Financials as of Japanese fiscal year ended 31 March 2025. References

The Oriental Land Co., Ltd. (Japanese: 株式会社オリエンタルランド, Hepburn: Kabushiki gaisha Orientaru Rando; OLC) is a Japanese leisure and tourism company headquartered in Urayasu, Chiba, Japan, where it owns and operates the Tokyo Disney Resort. The company operates in three segments: theme parks, hotels, and other businesses. It is a component of the TOPIX Large70 index. The company’s largest shareholder is the Keisei Electric Railway, which holds 22% of its shares.

Oriental Land pays licenses and royalties to the Walt Disney Company for the use of Disney intellectual property, while Disney provides consultation and design services through Walt Disney Imagineering for the resort’s theme parks and attractions. OLC is the only Disney resort operator that has no capital relationship with Disney.

== History ==
Oriental Land was founded in 1960. The company was developing Maihama, an area of land in Urayasu that was created through land reclamation. Two years later, the company contacted Disney about building a theme park. OLC was also building a few shopping centers in Chiba Prefecture.

In 1979, Oriental Land and Walt Disney Productions agreed to build the theme park. Tokyo Disneyland opened on April 15, 1983 on 200 acres in Maihama. The company borrowed $1.4 billion for Disneyland which they paid off in three years.

Disney announced in November 1995 the building of Tokyo DisneySea to be owned by OLC next to the Tokyo Disneyland. Oriental and Disney signed the DisneySea licensing agreement in November 1997 with the theme park to open in 2001 at a cost of $2.6 billion. In May 1999, the company sold two sets of bonds, $200 million in quake bonds and $406 million of bonds to fund DisneySea. DisneySea opened on September 4, 2001 at only $200 million over budget.

In 2000, OLC formed Ikspiari Co., Ltd. to run Ikspiari.

Even though the Disney Stores maintained strong sales, mounting cost of sales and operation and the loss of key executives who had driven the Disney Stores to success led The Walt Disney Company to convert the Disney Stores into a licensed operation. The Japanese stores were sold to the company in April 2002 and placed into Retail Networks Co., Ltd. subsidiary.

In October 2008, Oriental Land announced that it and Disney had shelved plans for a new Disney complex in a major Japanese city. The company and Disney had spent more than a year studying an urban-style amusement facility for 2010 or later, but ended planning due to low profits expected versus the investment. The firm said it would continue to explore possibilities for a new business, which might not involve Disney.

Oriental Land announced an agreement that it would sell Retail Networks Co., Ltd., its Japanese Disney Stores, back to The Walt Disney Company. Disney took over beginning on March 31, 2010, Retail Networks Co., Ltd., Oriental Land Company subsidiary owning the Disney Stores in Japan. OLC's hotel subsidiary, Milial Resort Hotels Co., Ltd. purchased on March 29, 2013 the Brighton Corporation, another hotel company.

On August 31, 2015, Create Restaurants Holdings Inc. fully acquired RC Japan Co., Ltd. from Oriental Land for 65 million yen.

In Nov 2024, Oriental Land Company announced that the Tokyo International Cruise Terminal would serve as the home port for the Disney Imagination with service scheduled to begin in 2029.

== Corporate assets ==
- Tokyo Disney Resort, Theme Park segment
  - Tokyo Disneyland
  - Tokyo DisneySea
- Milial Resort Hotels Co., Ltd., Hotel Business segment
  - Disney Ambassador Hotel
  - Tokyo DisneySea Hotel MiraCosta
  - Tokyo Disneyland Hotel
  - Tokyo Disney Resort Toy Story Hotel
  - Tokyo DisneySea Fantasy Springs Hotel
- Brighton Corporation, Ltd., Hotel Business segment
  - Tokyo Disney Celebration Hotel
  - Urayasu Brighton Hotel Tokyo Bay
  - Kyoto Brighton Hotel
  - Hotel Brighton City Osaka Kitahama
- Other Business segment
  - Oriental Land Cruise Co., LTD, operating under the name Disney Cruise Line Japan. Will operate the Disney Imagination ship, expected to launch in 2029. A second ship is optional.
  - IKSPIARI Co., Ltd., operates Ikspiari, an entertainment complex near the theme parks that has 9 themed zones with more than 100 shops and a 16-screen cinema.
  - Maihama Resort Line Co., Ltd. operates Disney Resort Line, a monorail service.
- Affiliate transportation companies under shared ownership with Keisei Electric Railway Co., Ltd.
  - keisei Bus Chiba West Co., Ltd.(26.8%)(former Tokyo Bay City Kotsu Co., Ltd. and Keisei Transit Bus Co., Ltd.)
