= Tokyo Disney Resort =

Theme park and vacation resort in Chiba, Japan

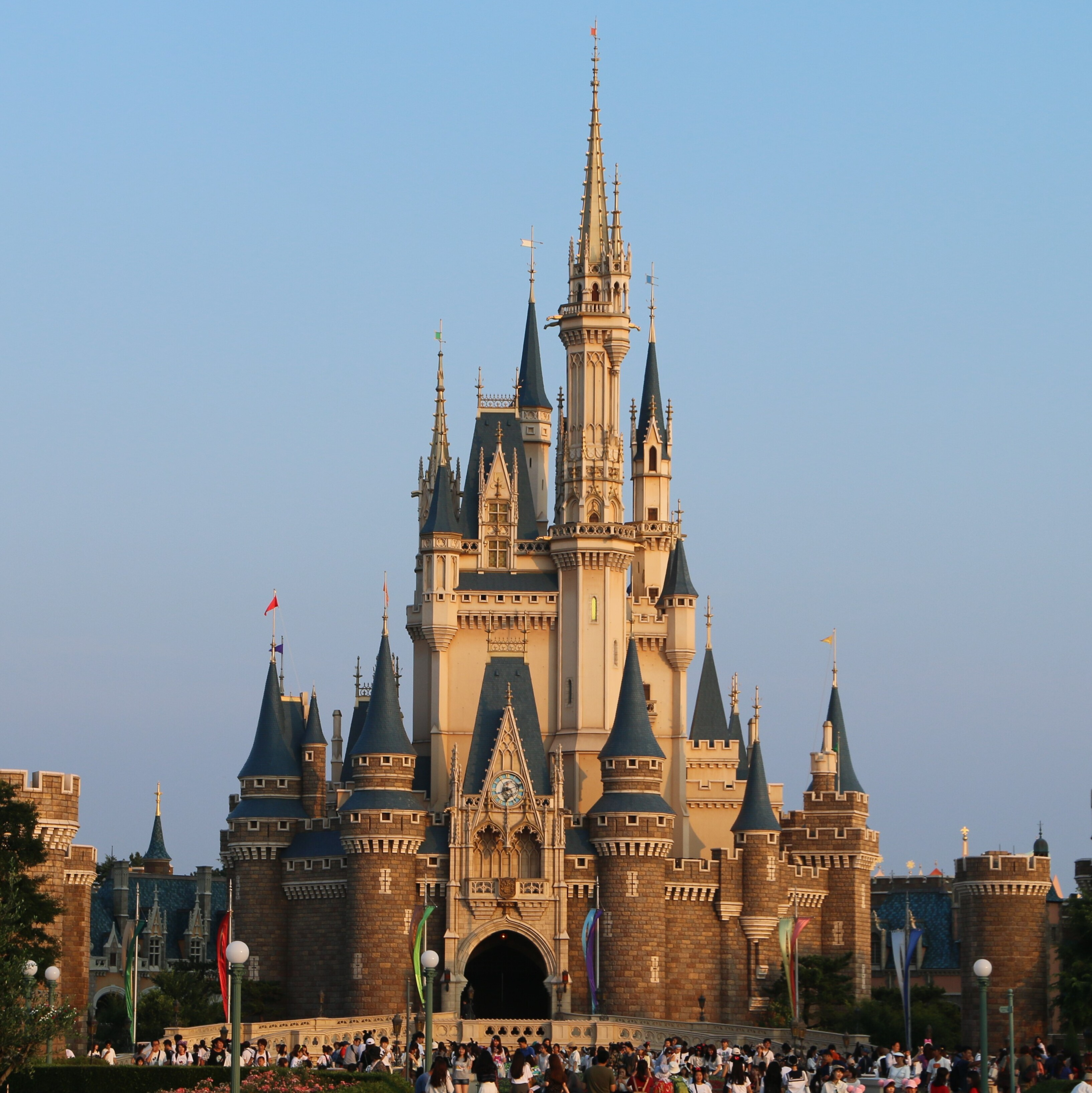
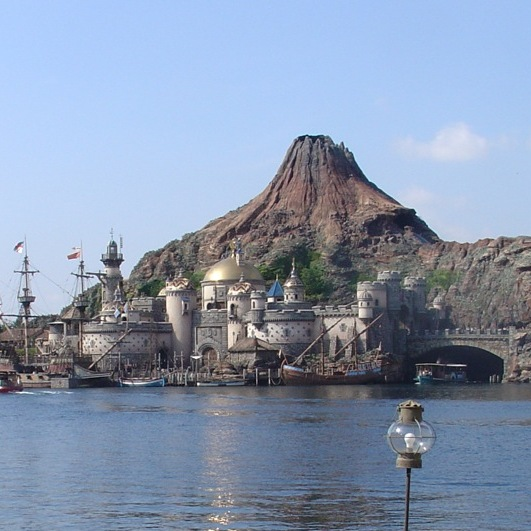
- Two icons of the Tokyo Disney Resort: Cinderella Castle at Tokyo Disneyland and Mount Prometheus at Tokyo DisneySea.
- Industry: Amusement parks and resorts
- Founded: April 15, 1983; 43 years ago
- Headquarters: Urayasu, Chiba, Japan
- Key people: Yumiko Takano (chairman); Wataru Takahashi (president)
- Owner: The Oriental Land Company, under license from Disney Experiences
- Website: Official website

Tokyo Disney Resort (東京ディズニーリゾート, Tōkyō Dizunī Rizōto) (local nickname TDR) is a theme park and vacation resort located in Urayasu, Chiba, Japan, just east of Tokyo. The resort is owned and operated by the Oriental Land Co., a subsidiary of the Keisei Electric Railway, under a license from The Walt Disney Company, which designed and constructed the resort and its various attractions through its Imagineering research & development arm.

The resort opened on April 15, 1983, as a single theme park (Tokyo Disneyland), later developing into a resort with a second theme park (Tokyo DisneySea), six Disney themed hotels, six non-Disney hotels and a shopping complex (Ikspiari). Tokyo Disneyland was the first Disney theme park to open outside the United States and the complex is the only Disney resort in the world not owned or operated by Disney Experiences in any capacity.

== Attractions ==
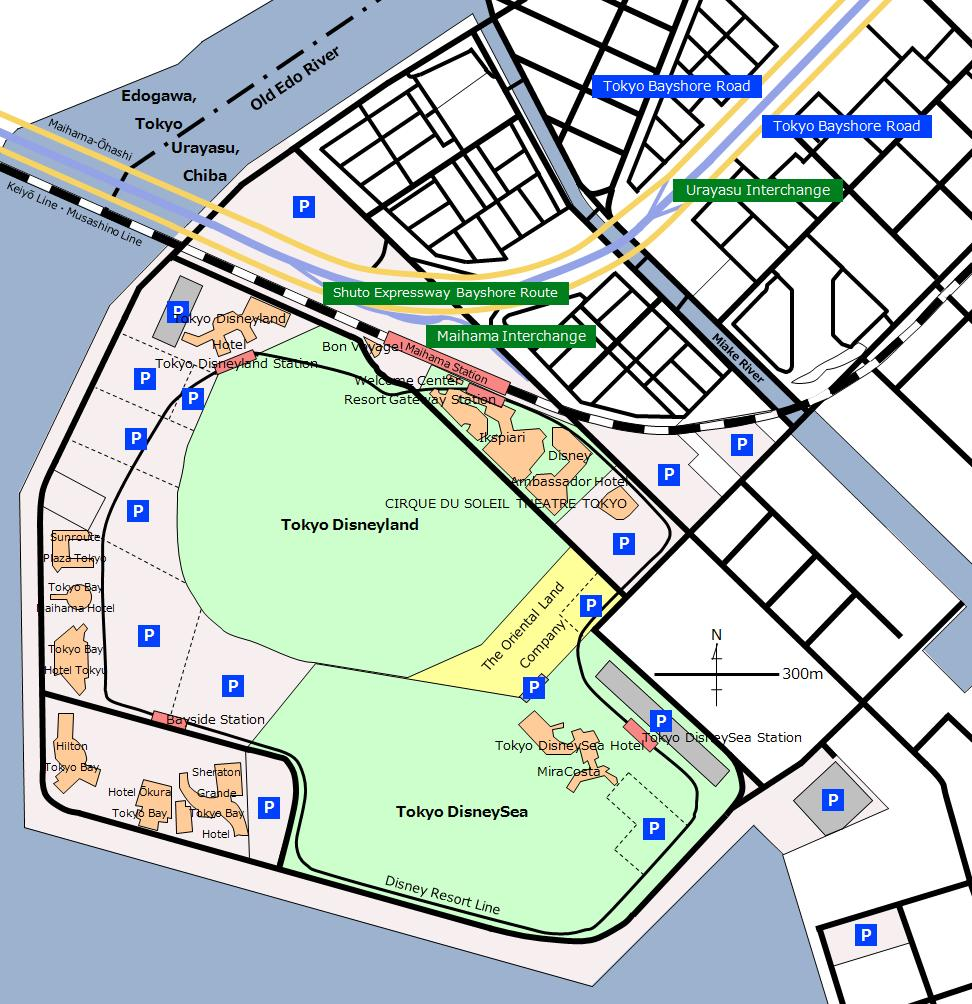
Map of the Tokyo Disney Resort as of 2008

Tokyo Disney Resort consists of Tokyo Disneyland, Tokyo DisneySea, and Ikspiari, which is a variation of the Downtown Disney and Disney Springs shopping, dining, and entertainment areas found at the Disney resorts in Anaheim and Lake Buena Vista respectively. It also contains Bon Voyage!, a large Disney goods specialty shop.

Like other Disney resorts, the Tokyo Disney Resort includes several Disney-branded hotels; the resort's one "Luxury" Hotel is the Tokyo DisneySea Fantasy Springs Hotel(Grand Chateau) and four "Deluxe" Hotels are the Disney Ambassador Hotel, the Tokyo DisneySea Hotel MiraCosta the Tokyo Disneyland Hotel and the Tokyo DisneySea Fantasy Springs Hotel(Fantasy Chateau). The Resort also includes the "Moderate" type Tokyo Disney Resort Toy Story Hotel and the "Value" type Tokyo Disney Resort Celebration Hotel. There are six other hotels located on the Tokyo Disney Resort property. These, however, are not Disney-branded hotels and are owned by other companies, similar to the Hotel Plaza Boulevard hotels at Walt Disney World.

All facilities are linked by the Disney Resort Line monorail, with the exception of the Celebration Hotel which is connected to the resort area via a free 15-minute shuttle. The Tokyo Disney Resort is headed by Yumiko Takano, who is the representative director (CEO) of the Oriental Land Company.

== Theme parks ==
- Tokyo Disneyland, the first theme park built at the resort. Tokyo Disneyland opened on April 15, 1983 and is mostly based on its sister castle parks Magic Kingdom and Disneyland.
- Tokyo DisneySea, the second theme park to open at the resort. Tokyo DisneySea opened on September 4, 2001 and is themed after nautical exploration, adventure, and different ports of call from around the world.

== Shopping ==
- Bon Voyage! – The resort's official Disney goods speciality shop, similar to World of Disney at other Disney resorts.

=== Ikspiari ===
Ikspiari
- Ikspiari (イクスピアリ, Ikusupiari)

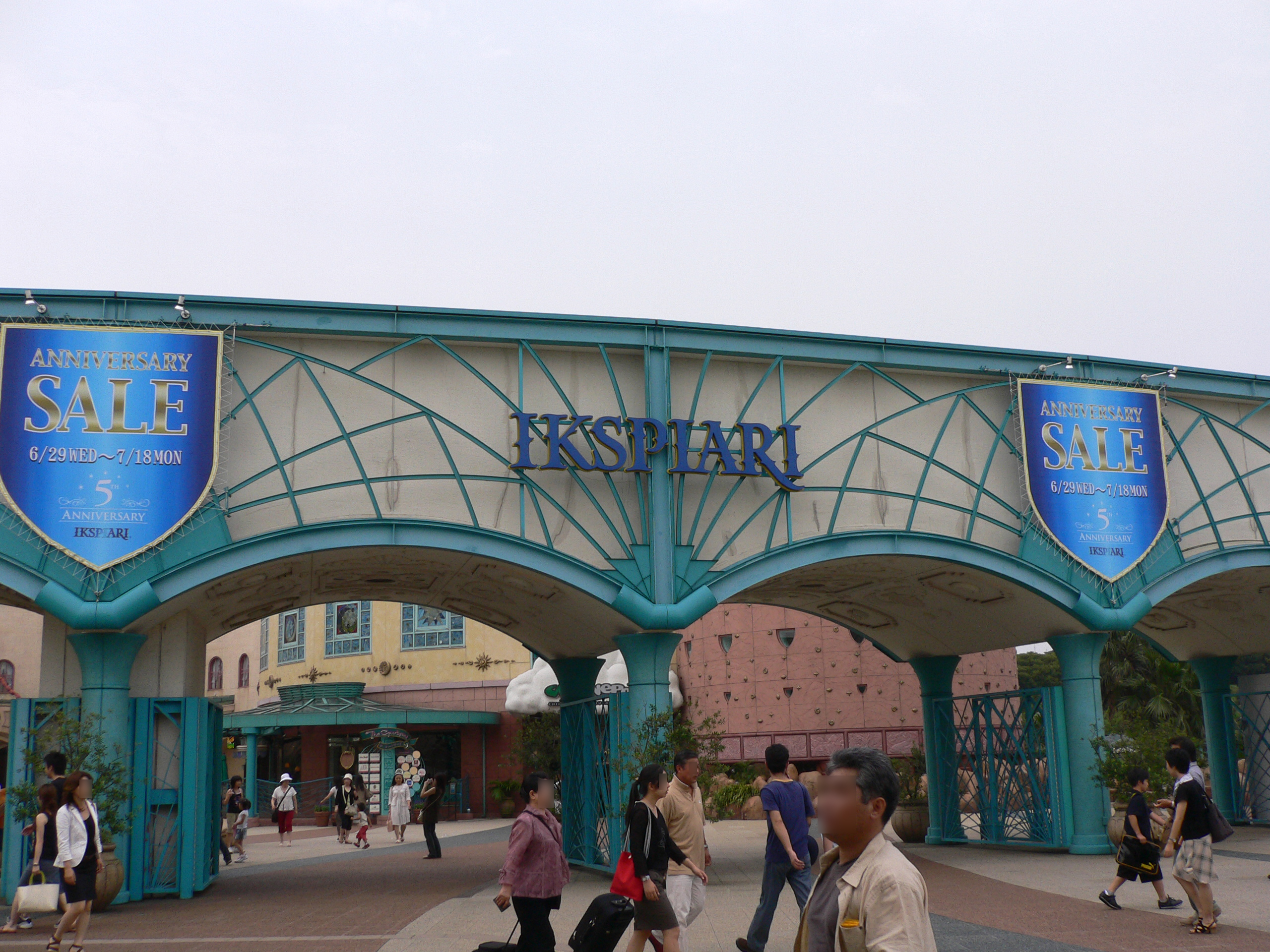
- Ikspiari Main Gate
- Coordinates: 35°38′02″N 139°53′11″E
- Opened: July 7, 2000; 26 years ago
- Owner: The Oriental Land Company
- Floors: 4

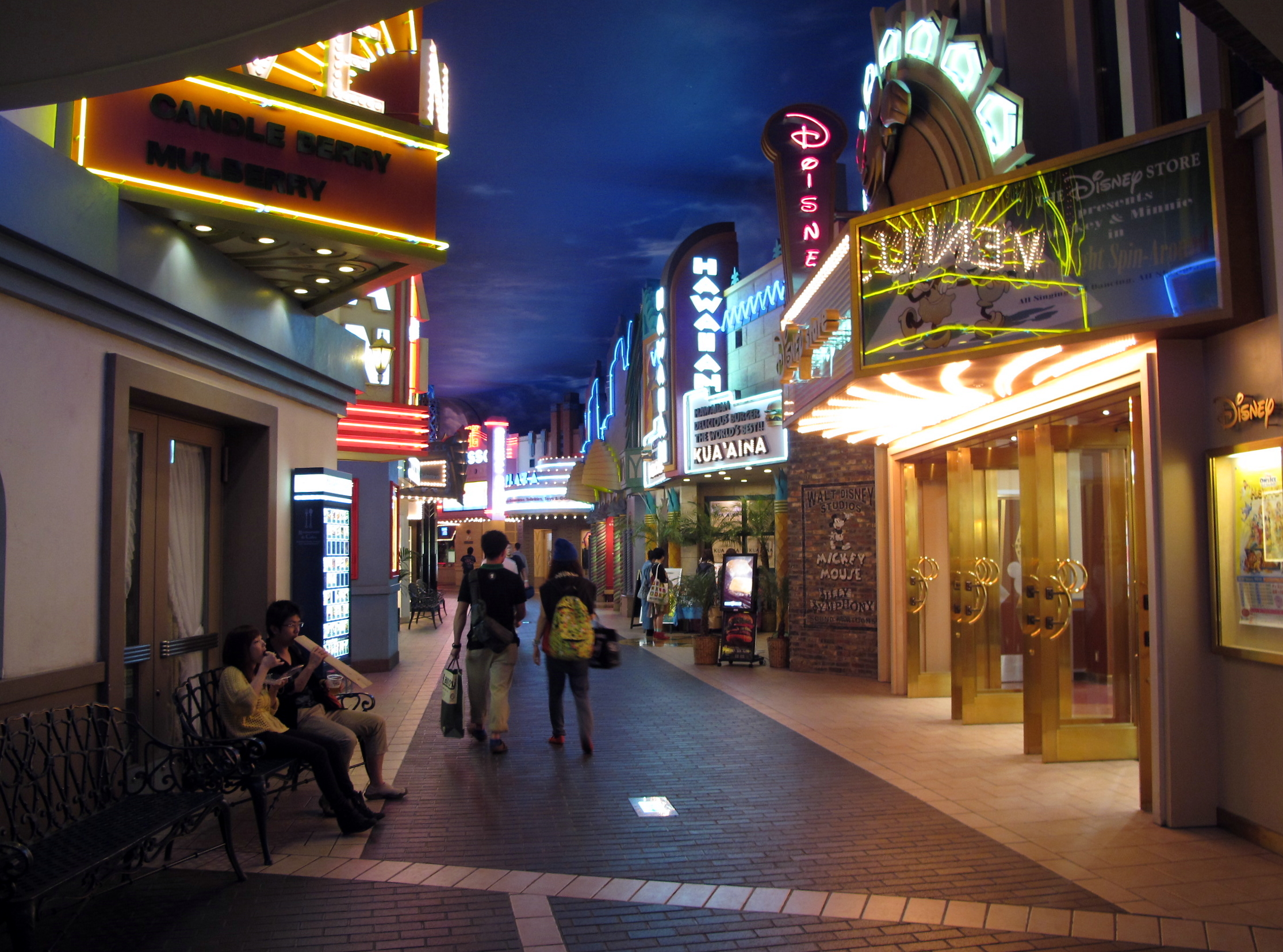
Ikspiari Level 2 Shops

Ikspiari (イクスピアリ, Ikusupiari) is a shopping, dining, and entertainment complex at the Tokyo Disney Resort in Urayasu, Chiba, Japan. The complex is operated by IKSPIARI Co., Ltd., a subsidiary of the owner, The Oriental Land Company, it is the Japanese equivalent of the Downtown Disney complex at Disneyland Resort in Anaheim, California, Disney Springs at Walt Disney World Resort in Lake Buena Vista, Florida, and Disney Village at Disneyland Paris, France. Ikspiari is close to Maihama Station on the Keiyō Line from Tokyo, and is also served by Resort Gateway Station on the Disney Resort Line.

Ikspiari opened on July 7, 2000. At the complex, the 12th non-US Rainforest Cafe opened in July 2000. On August 31, 2015, Create Restaurants Holdings Inc. fully acquired RC Japan Co., Ltd., the Rainforest Cafe franchisee, at the complex.

== Hotels ==
=== Disney hotels ===
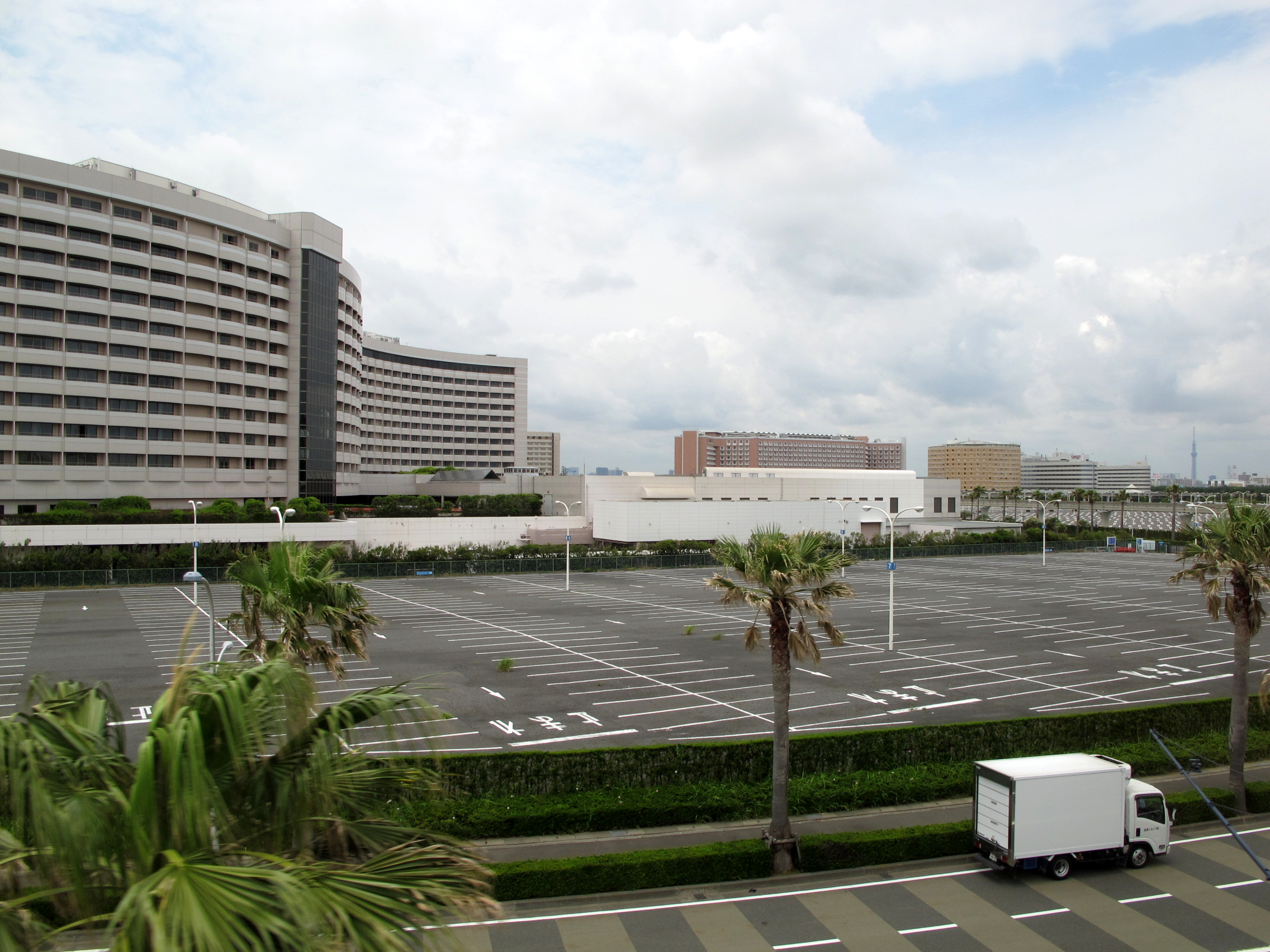
Official Hotels

Name	Image	Opening date	Theme	Number of rooms
Luxury hotels
Tokyo DisneySea Fantasy Springs Hotel (Grand Chateau)		June 6, 2024	Magical château	56
Deluxe hotels
Disney Ambassador Hotel		July 20, 2000	Art deco	504
Tokyo DisneySea Hotel MiraCosta		September 4, 2001	Portofino	502
Tokyo Disneyland Hotel		July 8, 2008	Victorian	701
Tokyo DisneySea Fantasy Springs Hotel (Fantasy Chateau)		June 6, 2024	Magical château	419
Moderate hotel
Tokyo Disney Resort Toy Story Hotel		April 5, 2022	Toy Story franchise	595
Value hotel
Tokyo Disney Celebration Hotel		June 1, 2016	Disney animated films	702

=== Official non-Disney hotels ===
- Sunroute Plaza Tokyo
- Tokyo Bay Maihama Hotel
- Tokyo Bay Maihama Hotel Club Resort
- Hilton Tokyo Bay
- Hotel Okura Tokyo Bay
- Sheraton Grande Tokyo Bay Hotel

== See also ==
- Large amusement railways
- Rail transport in Walt Disney Parks and Resorts
- Tourism in Japan
