= Urayasu =

Urayasu 浦安市
- City
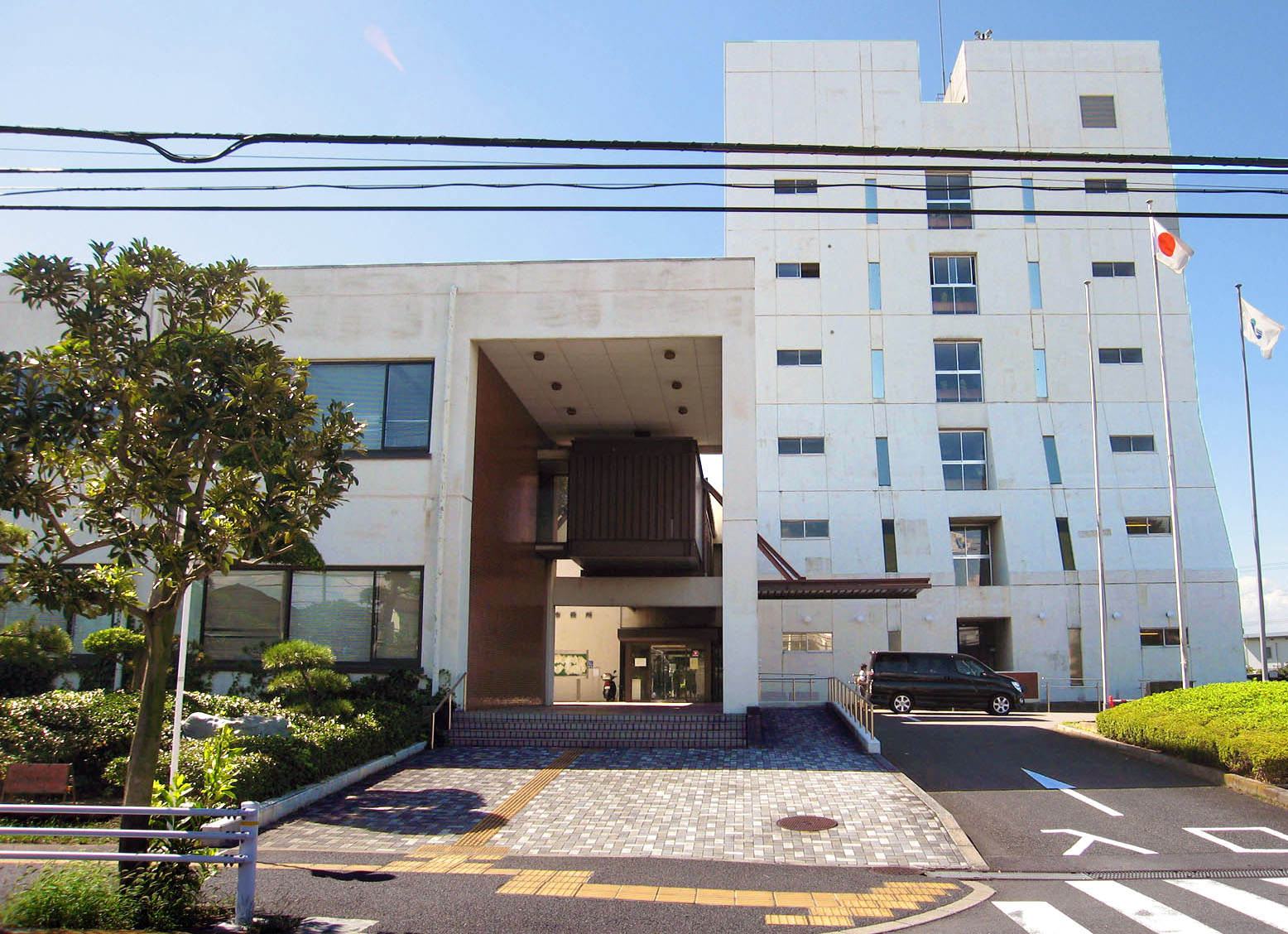
- Urayasu City Hall

- Flag Seal

- Location of Urayasu in Chiba Prefecture

- Coordinates: 35°39′14.2″N 139°54′7.8″E
- Country: Japan
- Region: Kantō
- Prefecture: Chiba
- First official history: 1157
- City Settled: April 1, 1981

Government
  - Mayor: Hideki Matsuzaki (since November 1998)

Area
  - Total: 17.30 km^{2} (6.68 sq mi)

Population (April 1, 2021)
  - Total: 170,091
  - Density: 9,832/km^{2} (25,460/sq mi)
- Time zone: UTC+9 (Japan Standard Time)
- -Tree: Ginkgo biloba
- Flower: Azalea
- Phone number: 047-351-1111
- Address: 1-1-1 Nekozane, Urayasu-shi, Chiba-ken 279-8501
- Website: Official website

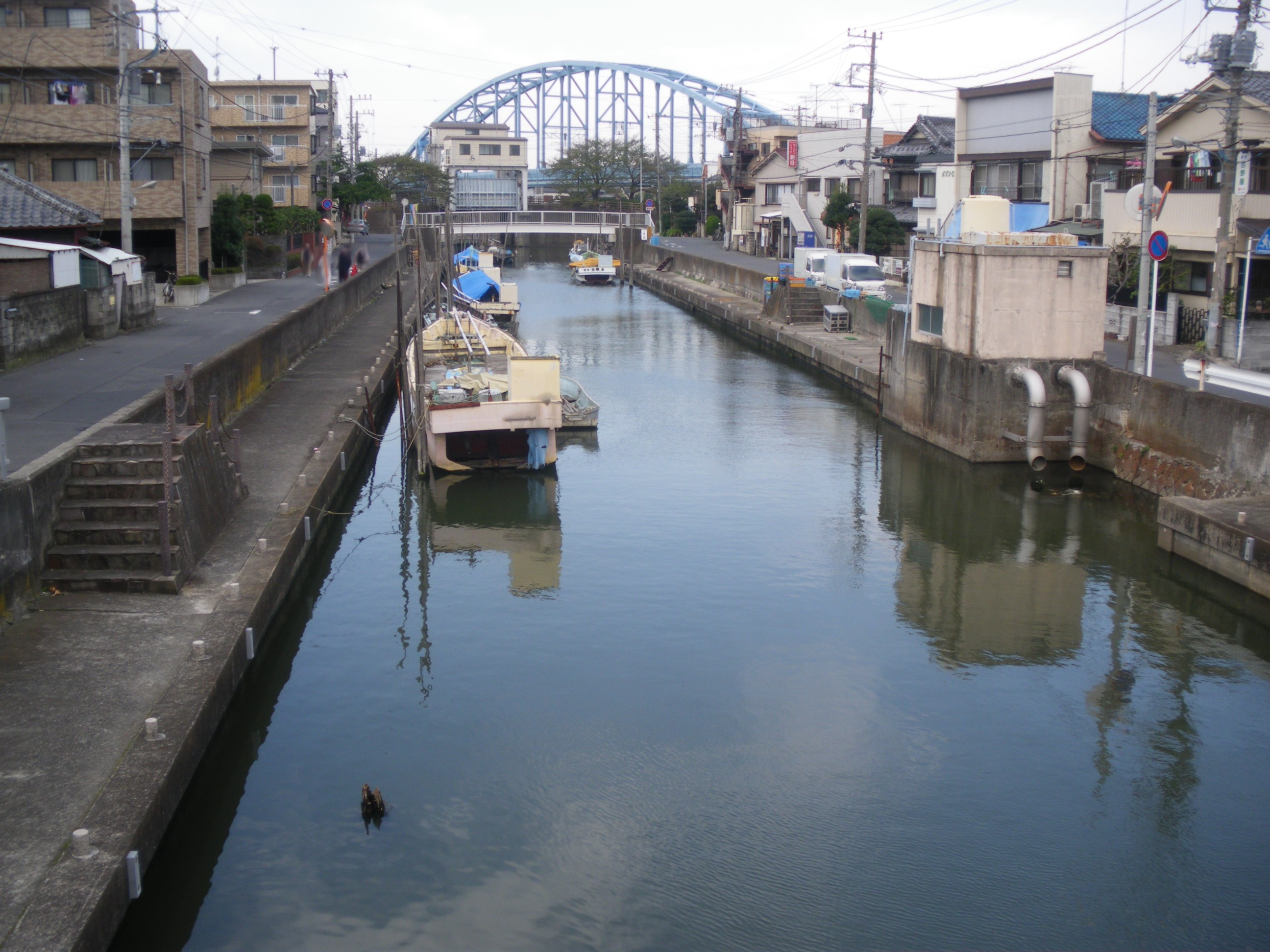
Old Urayasu

Urayasu (浦安市, Urayasu-shi; Japanese pronunciation: [ɯ̈̀.ɾä́.jä́.sɨ́(.ɕì)]) is a city located in Chiba Prefecture, Japan. As of 1 November 2020, the city had an estimated population of 170,533 in 81,136 households and a population density of 9,900 inhabitants per square kilometre (26,000/sq mi). The total area of the city is 17.30 square kilometres (6.68 sq mi). Urayasu is best known as the home of Tokyo Disney Resort, which opened in April 1983, and the headquarters of The Oriental Land Company.

== History ==
=== Early history ===
The area around Urayasu was tenryō territory within Shimōsa Province controlled directly by the Tokugawa shogunate during the Edo period. Urayasu served as an important fishing village for the Edo capitol. Until the industrialization of the city it was a major center of production of nori, an edible seaweed, hamaguri, and asari clams. All three are important elements of the traditional Japanese diet.

=== Timeline ===
==== Meiji and Taisho eras ====
- 1868 - After the Meiji Restoration in 1868, the area became part of Chiba Prefecture.
- 1889 - Urayasu Village was created on April 1, 1889, under Higashikatsushika District with the establishment of the modern municipalities system.
- 1909 - Urayasu became a town in September 1909.

==== Showa and Heisei eras ====
- 1944 - Many of the residents of Urayasu perished during the 1944 Bombing of Tokyo.
- 1961 - Urayasu grew in the 1960s and 1970s with massive landfill projects along the shores of Tokyo Bay, public housing projects, and increasing infrastructure.
- 1962 - Urayasu became part of the Keiyō Industrial Zone in this period, which spans from the city across the Tokyo Bay coast of Chiba Prefecture to Futtsu to the south. An area of the Tokyo Bay near the town was reclaimed from the sea in 1960s called Maihama.
- 1971 - Fishing was abandoned in Urayasu due to the industrialization of the city.
- 1981 - Urayasu was elevated to city status on April 1, 1981.
- 1983 - Tokyo Disneyland opened on 15 April 1983 on 200 acres in Maihama.
- 2000 - Disney Ambassador Hotel was opened on 20 July 2000 as the first official Disney hotel in the resort, featuring art deco theming.
- 2001 - Tokyo DisneySea was opened on 4 September 2001.
- 2008 - Tokyo Disneyland Hotel was opened on July 8, 2008, as part of Tokyo Disney Resort's 25th anniversary celebrations.
- 2011:
  - 11 March: Urayasu was greatly affected by earthquake, tsunami, and subsequent Fukushima nuclear disaster.
  - 8 April - Following the triple disaster, Urayasu with major areas of reclaimed land, had as much as 85% of the utility infrastructure, roads, buildings, and houses damaged or affected to some degree by soil liquefaction caused by earthquake. The damage cost the city approximately ¥73.4 billion to repair.
  - 11 April - Urayasu was affected by April 2011 Fukushima earthquake.
  - 12 April - Tokyo Disneyland was officially reopened following the triple disaster.
- 2013 - Tokyo Disneyland commemorates 30th anniversary of opened.
- 2016 - Tokyo Disney Celebration Hotel was opened on 1 June 2016 outside of the resort in nearby Shin-Urayasu. The hotel was refurbished from the former Palm & Fountain Terrace Hotel. The hotel is divided across two buildings called Wish and Discover. The two properties complement each other but vary in theming. This is the only official Disney hotel not located in the Resort area. A free 15-minute shuttle is available for guests.

== Geography ==
Urayasu is located in the northwestern part of Chiba Prefecture, about 20 kilometers from the prefectural capital at Chiba and within 10 to 20 kilometers from the center of Tokyo. It consists of a low-lying natural levee, a delta and a reclaimed land on the left bank of the mouth of the Edo River. The river runs along the western side of the city and separates it from the Edogawa ward of Tokyo. There are two parts to Urayasu: the original fishing village on natural levee on both banks of the Sakai River, which is a tributary of the Edo River, and the newer reclaimed land portion which occupies about three-quarters of the city area, created since the 1960s. The new landfill area is called "Shin-Urayasu" (New-Urayasu), and has an "American" inspired layout, with a grid-like map of wide streets, large sidewalks, palm trees and parks. The buildings are tall, modern apartments, some having views on Tokyo Bay. Urayasu is one of the most sought after areas in the metropolitan area for young families to live.

=== Climate ===
Urayasu has a humid subtropical climate (Köppen Cfa) characterized by warm summers and cool winters with light to no snowfall. The average annual temperature in Urayasu is 15.6 °C. The average annual rainfall is 1435 mm with September as the wettest month. The temperatures are highest on average in August, at around 27.0 °C, and lowest in January, at around 6.2 °C.

=== Neighboring municipalities ===
Chiba Prefecture

- Ichikawa

Tokyo Metropolis

- Edogawa

== Government ==
Urayasu has a mayor-council form of government with a directly elected mayor and a unicameral city council of 21 members. Urayasu contributes two members to the Chiba Prefectural Assembly. In terms of national politics, the city is part of Chiba 5th district of the lower house of the Diet of Japan.

== Demographics ==
Per Japanese census data, the population of Urayasu has increased more than eighteen-fold over the past century, and grew especially rapidly between 1970 and 2010.

Historical population
Year	Pop.	±%
1920	9,146	—
1930	10,537	+15.2%
1940	12,116	+15.0%
1950	15,679	+29.4%
1960	16,847	+7.4%
1970	21,880	+29.9%
1980	64,673	+195.6%
1990	115,675	+78.9%
2000	132,894	+14.9%
2010	164,877	+24.1%
2020	171,362	+3.9%

== Economy ==
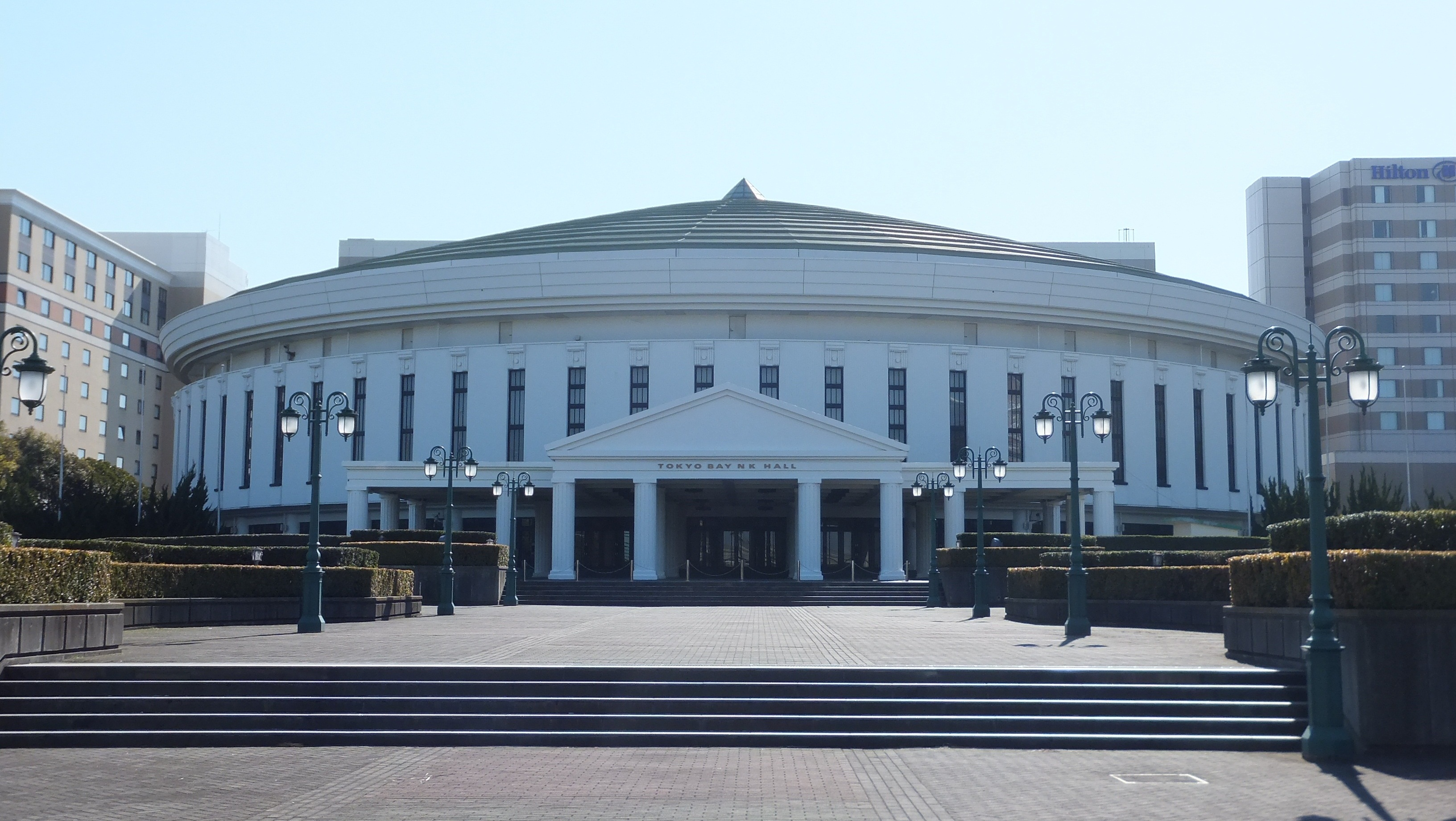
Tokyo Bay NK Hall, Urayasu

Urayasu is a regional commercial center and a bedroom community for nearby Chiba and Tokyo. The commuting rate to the central Tokyo is 49.0% per the 2015 interim census. The primary local employer in the city is The Oriental Land Company and businesses related to Tokyo Disney Resort.

== Education ==
=== Universities ===
- Juntendo University
- Meikai University
- Ryotokuji University

=== High schools ===
Public (operated by Chiba Prefectural Board of Education):

- Urayasu High School (千葉県立浦安高等学校)
- Urayasu Minami High School (千葉県立浦安南高等学校)

Private schools:

- Tokyo Gakkan Urayasu High School (東京学館浦安高等学校)
- Tokai University Urayasu Junior & Senior High School (東海大学付属浦安高等学校)

=== Primary and middle schools ===
Urayasu has 17 public elementary schools and nine public junior high schools operated by the city government and two private middle schools.

Municipal junior high schools:

- Akemi (明海中学校)
- Hinode (日の出中学校)
- Horie (堀江中学校)
- Irifune (入船中学校)
- Miakegawa (見明川中学校)
- Mihama (美浜中学校)
- Takasu (高洲中学校)
- Tomioka (富岡中学校)
- Urayasu (浦安中学校)

Municipal elementary schools:

- Akemi (明海小学校)
- Akemi Minami (明海南小学校)
- Higashi (東小学校)
- Higashino (東野小学校)
- Hinode (日の出小学校)
- Hinode Minami (日の出南小学校)
- Hokubu (北部小学校)
- Irifune (入船小学校)
- Maihama (舞浜小学校)
- Miakegawa (見明川小学校)
- Mihama Kita (美浜北小学校)
- Mihama Minami (美浜南小学校)
- Minami (南小学校)
- Takasu (高洲小学校)
- Takasu Kita (高洲北小学校)
- Tomioka (富岡小学校)
- Urayasu (浦安小学校)

== Transportation ==
=== Railway ===
JR East – Keiyō Line

- Maihama - Shin-Urayasu - Ichikawa-Shiohama

Tokyo Metro - Tokyo Metro Tōzai Line

- Urayasu

Maihama Resort Line - Disney Resort Line

- Resort Gateway - Tokyo Disneyland - Bayside - Tokyo DisneySea - Resort Gateway

=== Highway ===
- Bayshore Route
- National Route 357

== Sister cities ==
- Orlando, Florida, United States, since October 23, 1989

== Notable people from Urayasu ==
- Momoko Abe, model and Miss Universe Japan 2017
- Shinnosuke Abe, professional baseball player
- Keita Amemiya, video game designer
- Ichiko Aoba, folk singer and songwriter
- Daisuke Hayakawa, professional baseball player
- Rioka Kanda, singer-songwriter, radio personality
- Taiyo Koga, professional soccer player
- Keiji Tamada, professional soccer player
- Yoshihiro Yamazaki, professional wrestler, better known by his in-ring persona, fourth generation of Tiger Mask
