= List of assets owned by the Walt Disney Company =

This is a list of assets currently or formerly owned by the Walt Disney Company, unless otherwise indicated.

As of October 2024, the Walt Disney Company, or just Disney, is organized into three main segments: Disney Entertainment, which includes the company's film, television, music and streaming media assets, ESPN (including ESPN+) and Disney Experiences.

== Corporate-wide ==
- Disney Enterprises, Inc.
- TWDC Enterprises 18 Corporation
- Disney Worldwide Services, Inc.
- Disney Financial Services, LLC
- The Disney Children's Center, Inc.
- D23
- Earth Star, Inc.
- Grand Central Creative Campus (GC3)
- Disney DTC, LLC incorporated on March 22, 2018.

== Disney Entertainment ==
=== Walt Disney Studios ===
Divisions	Sub-divisions
Walt Disney Pictures	Walt Disney Animation Studios
Walt Disney Pictures	Pixar Animation Studios
Walt Disney Pictures	Disneynature
20th Century Studios	20th Century Animation
20th Century Studios	20th Century Family
Searchlight Pictures	Searchlight Television
Searchlight Pictures	Searchlight Shorts
Marvel Studios	Marvel Studios Animation
Marvel Studios	Marvel Film Productions LLC
Marvel Studios	MVL Development LLC (Delaware)
Marvel Studios	MVL Productions LLC
Lucasfilm	Lucasfilm Animation
Lucasfilm	Lucas Licensing: LucasBooks (licensed book publishing imprint)
Lucasfilm	Lucas Online
Lucasfilm	Lucasfilm Story Group
Lucasfilm	Skywalker Sound
Lucasfilm	Industrial Light & Magic: ILM San Francisco; ILM Vancouver; ILM London; ILM Sydney; ILM Mumbai; ILM Art; ILM Immersive; ILM StageCraft; ILM Technoprops; ILM TV
Walt Disney Studios Motion Pictures	Buena Vista International: Buena Vista Theatres, Inc. (basically) El Capitan Entertainment Centre; Disney Studio Store; El Capitan Theatre; Hollywood Masonic Temple; Buena Vista International Latin America; Buena Vista International Brazil; Patagonik Film Group (33.3%); BVS Entertainment; Walt Disney Japan; Walt Disney Studios Marketing; Worldwide Special Events
Walt Disney Studios Motion Pictures	Infinity Vision
Walt Disney Studios Home Entertainment	20th Century Home Entertainment

==== Disney Studio Services ====
Divisions	Assets	Note
Disney Digital Studio Services – Studio Post Production		
Studio Production Services	Walt Disney Studios (Burbank)	
Studio Production Services	Golden Oak Ranch	
Studio Production Services	Prospect Studios	
Studio Production Services	KABC7 Studio B	
Studio Production Services	Pinewood Studios	Most of the studio is under a 10-year lease from Pinewood Group.
Studio Production Services	Disney Studios Australia	

==== Disney Theatrical Group ====
Divisions	Assets
Disney Theatrical Productions	
Disney Live Family Entertainment	Disney on Ice (licensed)
Disney Live Family Entertainment	Disney Live (licensed)
Disney Live Family Entertainment	Marvel Universe Live! (licensed)
Disney Live Family Entertainment	Walt Disney Special Events Group
Disney Theatrical Licensing	
New Amsterdam Development Corp.	New Amsterdam Theatre (long-term lease)
New Amsterdam Theatrical Productions, Inc.	
Walt Disney Theatrical Worldwide, Inc.	
Buena Vista Theatrical	
Buena Vista Theatrical Ventures, Inc.	
Buena Vista Theatrical Merchandise, LLC	

==== Disney Music Group ====
Divisions	Assets	Note
Walt Disney Records		
Hollywood Records	DMG Nashville	
Marvel Music		
Buena Vista Records		Revived as a joint country label with Music Corporation of America.
S-Curve Records		
RMI Recordings		A joint "digital-first" talent label with the founders of DigiTour Media
Disney Concerts		
Disney Music Publishing	Agarita Music	
Disney Music Publishing	Buena Vista Music Co.	
Disney Music Publishing	Falferious Music	
Disney Music Publishing	Five Hundred South Songs	
Disney Music Publishing	Fuzzy Muppet Songs	
Disney Music Publishing	Holpic Music, Inc.	
Disney Music Publishing	Hollywood Pictures Music	
Disney Music Publishing	Pixar Music	
Disney Music Publishing	Pixar Talking Pictures	
Disney Music Publishing	Seven Peaks Music	
Disney Music Publishing	Seven Summits Music	
Disney Music Publishing	Touchstone Pictures Music & Songs, Inc.	
Disney Music Publishing	Utapau Music	
Disney Music Publishing	Mad Muppet Melodies	
Disney Music Publishing	Marvel Comics Music	
Disney Music Publishing	Walt Disney Music Company	
Disney Music Publishing	Wampa-Tauntaun Music	
Disney Music Publishing	Wonderland Music Company	
Universal Music Group	(List of Universal Music Group labels)	(minority)

=== Disney Consumer Products ===
==== Disney Games Group ====
Divisions	Assets	Notes
Developers	Disney Mobile: Starwave Mobile	
Developers	Disney Online	
Developers	Disney Electronic Content, Inc.	
Developers	Gamestar	
Developers	Rocket Pack	
Developers	Go.com	
Developers	Epic Games (9%)	
Publishers	Disney & Pixar Games	
Publishers	Marvel Games	
Publishers	Lucasfilm Games	
Publishers	20th Century Games	

==== DCPI content ====
Asset	Subsidiary	Note
DCPI content and media	Advanced Media	
DCPI content and media	Social media and Micro Content	
DCPI content and media	Disney Co/Op, custom content	
DCPI Labs team		

==== Disney Publishing Worldwide ====
Asset	Subsidiary	Note
Core Publishing	Disney Magazine Publishing, Inc.	
Core Publishing	Disney Libri	Italy
Core Publishing	Disney Libros	Spain
Core Publishing	Disney Book Group: Disney Comics; 20th Century Comics; Marvel Worldwide, Inc.; Marvel Comics; Marvel Custom Solutions; Marvel Press; Marvel Unlimited; Disney·Hyperion; Rick Riordan Presents; Disney·Jump at the Sun; Disney Lucasfilm Press; Disney Press; Disney Editions	Disney Book Publishing, Inc.
Digital Publishing - Disney Book Apps		
Disney Learning	Disney Educational Productions	
Disney Learning	Disney Imagicademy	
NG Media	National Geographic Magazines	
NG Media	National Geographic Books	National Geographic Kids Books: Under the Stars fiction imprint
NG Media	National Geographic Maps	

=== Disney Entertainment Television ===
Divisions	Sub-divisions
Disney Television Studios	20th Television: 20th Television Animation
Disney Television Studios	Walt Disney Television Alternative
Disney Platform Distribution	Disney-ABC Home Entertainment and Television Distribution
ABC Entertainment	ABC: George Stephanopoulos Productions; Rock 'n Robin Productions
ABC Entertainment	ABC Owned Television Stations: 8 owned-and-operated ABC stations; Localish
ABC Entertainment	ABC News: ABC News Live; ABC Audio; ABC News Radio; ABC News Studios
Disney Kids & Family	Disney Channel
Disney Kids & Family	Disney Jr.
Disney Kids & Family	Disney XD (United States and Poland)
Disney Kids & Family	Disney Television Animation
Disney Kids & Family	Disney Original Documentary
Disney Kids & Family	ABC Family Worldwide: Freeform; BVS Entertainment
Disney Kids & Family	It's A Laugh Productions
FX Networks	FX
FX Networks	FXX
FX Networks	FX Movie Channel
FX Networks	FX Entertainment: FX Productions
National Geographic Partners	National Geographic Global Networks: National Geographic; Nat Geo Wild; Nat Geo Mundo; National Geographic Studios
National Geographic Partners	National Geographic Documentary Films
National Geographic Partners	National Geographic Magazine
Onyx Collective

=== Disney Streaming ===
Asset	Subdivision	Notes
Disney+	Steamboat Willie Productions LLC	
Disney+	Star	Only offered in Japan as of October 8, 2025
Hulu	Hulu Documentary Films	
Hulu	HJ Holdings	Joint venture with Nippon Television Network Corporation, LY Corporation, Toho, Yomiuri Telecasting Corporation, and Chukyo TV. Broadcasting Co., Ltd.)
ESPN (72%)		Joint venture with Hearst Communications and National Football League
FuboTV (70%)	Hulu + Live TV	Undisclosed stake owned by Skydance
JioHotstar (36.84%)		Joint venture between Disney India, Viacom18, and Reliance Industries
NHL.tv		
Movies Anywhere		

=== International Content and Operations ===
Asset	Notes
International Network Brands
24Kitchen	
BabyTV	
Cinecanal	Offered in Latin America (except for Brazil)
Dlife	Offered in Japan; first incarnation shut down on March 31, 2020. Revived on March 1, 2024, a replacement for Fox.
National Geographic Global Networks	73% with National Geographic Society
Now	Offered in Turkey; formerly Fox
Star Channel	
Star Life	
FX Life	

==== The Walt Disney Company Europe, Middle East and Africa ====
The Walt Disney Company Europe, Middle East and Africa
- Trade name: The Walt Disney Company Limited
- Type: Division
- Founded: 1954; 72 years ago
- Headquarters: 3 Queen Caroline Street, Hammersmith, London W6 9PE, United Kingdom
- Area served: Europe; Middle East; Africa
- Key people: Tony Chambers (president)
- Parent: The Walt Disney Company
- Website: thewaltdisneycompany.eu

The Walt Disney Company Europe, Middle East & Africa (doing business as The Walt Disney Company Limited) is the largest international division of the Walt Disney Company, serving Europe, the Middle East and Africa (EMEA). Its headquarters are located at 3 Queen Caroline Street, Hammersmith, West London, and have most of its locations, mostly in Europe.

The Walt Disney Company Europe, Middle East and Africa	Asset	Subsidiary	Note
The Walt Disney Company Europe, Middle East and Africa	The Walt Disney Company CIS		
The Walt Disney Company Europe, Middle East and Africa	The Walt Disney Company France		
The Walt Disney Company Europe, Middle East and Africa	The Walt Disney Company (Germany; GmbH)		
The Walt Disney Company Europe, Middle East and Africa	Disney Television (Germany), Inc.		
The Walt Disney Company Europe, Middle East and Africa	The Walt Disney Company Italy		
The Walt Disney Company Europe, Middle East and Africa	The Walt Disney Company Limited (UK)		Official Website
The Walt Disney Company Europe, Middle East and Africa	The Walt Disney Company Nordic		
The Walt Disney Company Europe, Middle East and Africa	The Walt Disney Company Hungary Kft.		
The Walt Disney Company Europe, Middle East and Africa	The Walt Disney Company Türkiye	TWDC FTA Media and Business Ltd.	
The Walt Disney Company Europe, Middle East and Africa	The Walt Disney Company Iberia S.L.: Sociedad Gestora de Television NET TV SA	The Walt Disney Company Portugal	Portuguese division responsible for the operations, distribution and marketing of TV channels
The Walt Disney Company Europe, Middle East and Africa	The Walt Disney Company Iberia S.L.: Sociedad Gestora de Television NET TV SA	The Walt Disney Company Spain	Spanish division in charge of the company's business in Spain

==== The Walt Disney Company Latin America ====
Asset	Subsidiary	Subdivisions	Note
Disney Media Networks Latin America			Hispanic American division responsible for the operations, distribution and marketing of TV channels
Radio Disney Latin America	Radio Disney Latin America Stations		Radio Disney Bolivia is a joint venture with Empresa de Comunicaciones del Oriente
The Walt Disney Company Brazil			Brazilian division in charge of the company's business in Brazil
Joint ventures	Patagonik Film Group		Argentina
Joint ventures	Rede Telecine	Telecine Networks: Megapix; Telecine Action; Telecine Cult; Telecine Fun; Telecine Pipoca; Telecine Premium; Telecine Touch	Brazil — co-owned with Globosat, Paramount Pictures, Metro-Goldwyn-Mayer and Universal Studios until 2024

==== The Walt Disney Company Asia Pacific ====
The Walt Disney Company Asia Pacific
- Type: Division
- Founded: 1994; 32 years ago
- Headquarters: 138577 4 Loyang Lane, Singapore, Singapore
- Area served: Asia-Pacific
- Key people: Luke Kang (President)
- Parent: The Walt Disney Company

Asset	Subsidiary
PT Walt Disney Indonesia	
The Walt Disney Company (Japan) Ltd.	
The Walt Disney Company (Korea), LLC	
The Walt Disney Company (Malaysia) Sdn. Bhd.	
The Walt Disney Company (Philippines), Inc.	
The Walt Disney Company (Southeast Asia) Pte. Limited	
The Walt Disney Company (Vietnam)	
The Walt Disney (Thailand) Company Limited	
The Walt Disney Company India	Disney Star (37%)
Walt Disney Greater China	The Walt Disney Company (China) Limited
Walt Disney Greater China	The Walt Disney Company (Taiwan) Limited

== Disney Experiences ==
=== Disney retail ===
Asset	Subsidiary	Note
Disney Store Worldwide, Inc.	Disney Store North America	
Disney Store Worldwide, Inc.	Disney Store Europe	
Disney Store Worldwide, Inc.	Disney Store Japan	
Disney Store Worldwide, Inc.	Disney Shopping, Inc.	Formerly Disney Direct Marketing Services, Inc. Catalog and direct marketing channels
Disney Direct Response Publishing, Inc.		
Integrated Retail		Consolidates all other North American retail channels
Disney Gift Card Services, Inc.		The issuer of the Disney Gift Card

=== Parks and resorts ===
Asset	Subsidiary	Note
Disney parks merchandising	World of Disney	Retail stores
Disney parks merchandising	Magic of Disney	Orlando airport store
Walt Disney Imagineering Research & Development, Inc.	Disney Live Entertainment	
Walt Disney Imagineering Research & Development, Inc.	Disney Research China	
Walt Disney Imagineering Research & Development, Inc.	The Muppets Studio	
Disney Destinations, LLC	disneytravelagents.com	
Disney Sports Enterprises	ESPN Wide World of Sports Complex	
Disney Sports Enterprises	runDisney	
Disney's Fairy Tale Weddings & Honeymoons		
Disney's Yellow Shoes Creative Group		Internal advertising agency for Disney Experiences.
Partners Federal Credit Union		Federally chartered credit union. The not-for-profit financial cooperative offers membership to employees and cast members of The Walt Disney Company and their family members.

==== Disneyland Resort ====
Anaheim, California, United States

Disneyland Resort (Disneyland, Inc.)	Asset type	Asset	Note
Disneyland Resort (Disneyland, Inc.)	Theme parks	Disneyland	1955
Disneyland Resort (Disneyland, Inc.)	Theme parks	Disney California Adventure	2001
Disneyland Resort (Disneyland, Inc.)	Shopping complex	Downtown Disney	2001; 2021 retheme
Disneyland Resort (Disneyland, Inc.)	Resorts	Disneyland Hotel (WCO Hotels, Inc.)	1955
Disneyland Resort (Disneyland, Inc.)	Resorts	Disney's Grand Californian Hotel & Spa	
Disneyland Resort (Disneyland, Inc.)	Resorts	Pixar Place Hotel	2024 retheme

==== Walt Disney World Resort ====
Lake Buena Vista, Florida, United States

Walt Disney World Resort (Walt Disney World Company)	Asset type / District	Asset	Subsidiary	Note
Walt Disney World Resort (Walt Disney World Company)	Theme parks	Magic Kingdom		1971
Walt Disney World Resort (Walt Disney World Company)	Theme parks	Epcot		1982
Walt Disney World Resort (Walt Disney World Company)	Theme parks	Disney's Hollywood Studios		1989
Walt Disney World Resort (Walt Disney World Company)	Theme parks	Disney's Animal Kingdom		1998
Walt Disney World Resort (Walt Disney World Company)	Water parks	Disney's Blizzard Beach		1995
Walt Disney World Resort (Walt Disney World Company)	Water parks	Disney's Typhoon Lagoon		1989
Walt Disney World Resort (Walt Disney World Company)	Landholding companies	Compass Rose Corporation		
Walt Disney World Resort (Walt Disney World Company)	Landholding companies	Walt Disney Travel Company		
Walt Disney World Resort (Walt Disney World Company)	Landholding companies	Walt Disney World Hospitality and Recreation Corporation		
Walt Disney World Resort (Walt Disney World Company)	Central Florida Tourism Oversight District (formerly Reedy Creek Improvement District)	Reedy Creek Energy Services		
Walt Disney World Resort (Walt Disney World Company)	Central Florida Tourism Oversight District (formerly Reedy Creek Improvement District)	Bay Lake, Florida		
Walt Disney World Resort (Walt Disney World Company)	Central Florida Tourism Oversight District (formerly Reedy Creek Improvement District)	Lake Buena Vista, Florida		
Walt Disney World Resort (Walt Disney World Company)	Other attractions/features	Disney's BoardWalk		1996
Walt Disney World Resort (Walt Disney World Company)	Other attractions/features	Disney Springs		1975; 2015 retheme
Walt Disney World Resort (Walt Disney World Company)	Other attractions/features	Seven Seas Lagoon		
Walt Disney World Resort (Walt Disney World Company)	Other attractions/features	Bay Lake		
Walt Disney World Resort (Walt Disney World Company)	Other attractions/features	Transportation and Ticket Center		
Walt Disney World Resort (Walt Disney World Company)	Other attractions/features	Disney Transport	Disney Skyliner	2019
Walt Disney World Resort (Walt Disney World Company)	Other attractions/features	Disney Transport	Walt Disney World Monorail System	
Walt Disney World Resort (Walt Disney World Company)	Resorts	Disney's Animal Kingdom Lodge	Disney's Animal Kingdom Villas	
Walt Disney World Resort (Walt Disney World Company)	Resorts	Disney's Beach Club Resort	Disney's Beach Club Villas	
Walt Disney World Resort (Walt Disney World Company)	Resorts	Disney's BoardWalk Inn	Disney's BoardWalk Villas	
Walt Disney World Resort (Walt Disney World Company)	Resorts	Disney's Contemporary Resort	Bay Lake Tower at Disney's Contemporary Resort	
Walt Disney World Resort (Walt Disney World Company)	Resorts	Disney's Grand Floridian Resort & Spa	The Villas at Disney's Grand Floridian Resort & Spa	
Walt Disney World Resort (Walt Disney World Company)	Resorts	Disney's Grand Floridian Resort & Spa	Disney's Wedding Pavilion	
Walt Disney World Resort (Walt Disney World Company)	Resorts	Disney's Polynesian Village Resort	Disney's Polynesian Villas & Bungalows	
Walt Disney World Resort (Walt Disney World Company)	Resorts	Disney's Wilderness Lodge	Boulder Ridge Villas at Disney's Wilderness Lodge	
Walt Disney World Resort (Walt Disney World Company)	Resorts	Disney's Wilderness Lodge	Copper Creek Villas & Cabins at Disney's Wilderness Lodge	
Walt Disney World Resort (Walt Disney World Company)	Resorts	Disney's Yacht Club Resort		
Walt Disney World Resort (Walt Disney World Company)	Resorts	Disney's Caribbean Beach Resort		
Walt Disney World Resort (Walt Disney World Company)	Resorts	Disney's Coronado Springs Resort		
Walt Disney World Resort (Walt Disney World Company)	Resorts	Disney's Port Orleans Resort - French Quarter		
Walt Disney World Resort (Walt Disney World Company)	Resorts	Disney's Port Orleans Resort - Riverside		
Walt Disney World Resort (Walt Disney World Company)	Resorts	Disney's All-Star Movies Resort		
Walt Disney World Resort (Walt Disney World Company)	Resorts	Disney's All-Star Music Resort		
Walt Disney World Resort (Walt Disney World Company)	Resorts	Disney's All-Star Sports Resort		
Walt Disney World Resort (Walt Disney World Company)	Resorts	Disney's Art of Animation Resort		
Walt Disney World Resort (Walt Disney World Company)	Resorts	Disney's Pop Century Resort		
Walt Disney World Resort (Walt Disney World Company)	Resorts	Disney's Old Key West Resort		
Walt Disney World Resort (Walt Disney World Company)	Resorts	Disney's Saratoga Springs Resort & Spa		
Walt Disney World Resort (Walt Disney World Company)	Resorts	Disney's Fort Wilderness Resort & Campground		

==== Disney Parks International ====
Disneyland International, oversees Disney's interest in Tokyo Disney Resort. The WDC has taken full ownership of Euro Disneyland, opened on April 12, 1992, as the Euro Disney Resort, located in Marne-la-Vallée, near Paris, France. Disney owns 48% of Hong Kong International Theme Parks, while the Government of Hong Kong owns 52% of the shares.

Disneyland Paris
Euro Disney Investments, Inc.	Asset	Subsidiary	Subdivision	Note
Euro Disney Investments, Inc.	Euro Disney S.A.S.	Euro Disney S.C.A.		100% Disney owned
Euro Disney Investments, Inc.	Euro Disney S.A.S.	Euro Disney Associés		100% Disney owned
Euro Disney Investments, Inc.	Euro Disney S.A.S.	EDL Hotels SCA		100% Disney owned
Euro Disney Investments, Inc.	Euro Disney Investment SAS			Owning 9%, and general partner of Euro Disney Associés
Euro Disney Investments, Inc.	Centre de Congrès Newport S.A.S	Newport Bay Club Convention Centre		Convention Centre leased to EDL Hôtels S.C.A.
Euro Disney Investments, Inc.	EDL Holding Co. (99.9% owned by Disney)	Euro Disney S.C.A.	Euro Disney Commandité SAS.: Euro Disney Associés SCA; EDL Hôtels SCA; EDL Services SAS; Disneyland Hotel; Disney Hotel New York — The Art of Marvel; Disney Newport Bay Club; Disney Sequoia Lodge; Disney Hotel Cheyenne; Disney Hotel Santa Fe; Disney Davy Crockett Ranch; Disney Village; Golf Disneyland	Euro Disney S.C.A.: used to have 2% owned by public shareholders, directly owns 82% of Euro Disney Associés before 13 June 2017, since then it is a wholly owned subsidiary Euro Disney Associés S.C.A.: operating company of Disney Paris. EDL Hôtels S.C.A.: owns the Phase IB land and operates the hotels Euro Disney Commandité S.A.S.: a general partner of Euro Disney Associés; EDL Services SAS: manages Phase IB Financing Companies, owners of the various hotels and Disney Village
Euro Disneyland Participations S.A.S.	Euro Disneyland Park S.N.C. (17%)	Disneyland Park (Paris)		Opened as Euro Disneyland, 1992
Euro Disneyland Participations S.A.S.	Euro Disneyland Park S.N.C. (17%)	Disney Adventure World		2002

Hongkong International Theme Parks (HKITP)
Asset	Subsidiary	Note
Hong Kong Disneyland Resort (Penny's Bay, Lantau Island, Hong Kong)	Hong Kong Disneyland	2005
Hong Kong Disneyland Resort (Penny's Bay, Lantau Island, Hong Kong)	Inspiration Lake	Government owned but managed by the HKITP
Hong Kong Disneyland Hotel		
Disney's Hollywood Hotel		
Disney Explorers Lodge		2017
Hong Kong Disneyland Management Limited		Owned 100% by Disney and manages the park

Shanghai Disney Resort
Asset	Subsidiary	Notes
Shanghai International Theme Park Company Limited	Shanghai Disneyland	Shanghai International: 43% by Disney, 57% by Shanghai Shendi Group, who own the theme parks within the resort.
Shanghai International Theme Park Associated Facilities Company Limited		43% by Disney, 57% by Shanghai Shendi Group, who own the associated facilities within the resort
Shanghai International Theme Park and Resort Management Company Limited		70% by Disney, 30% by Shanghai Shendi Group, who manages the resort as a whole as well as the project to develop it.

==== Disney Signature Experiences ====
Asset	Subsidiary	Notes
Adventures by Disney		
National Geographic Expeditions		
Disney Cruise Line	Disney Magic (1997)	Ships
Disney Cruise Line	Disney Wonder (1998)	Ships
Disney Cruise Line	Disney Dream (2010)	Ships
Disney Cruise Line	Disney Fantasy (2012)	Ships
Disney Cruise Line	Disney Wish (2022)	Ships
Disney Cruise Line	Disney Treasure (2024)	Ships
Disney Cruise Line	Disney Adventure (2025)	Ships
Disney Cruise Line	Disney Destiny (2025)	Ships
Disney Cruise Line	Disney Believe (2027)	Ships
Disney Cruise Line	Castaway Cay (1998)	Ports
Disney Cruise Line	Lookout Cay at Lighthouse Point (2024)	Ports
Disney Cruise Line	Port Canaveral, Florida	Ports
Disney Cruise Line	Port Everglades, Florida	Ports
Disney Vacation Club Management Corp.	Disney's Vero Beach Resort	Resort located in Vero Beach, Florida
Disney Vacation Club Management Corp.	Disney's Hilton Head Island Resort	Resort located in Hilton Head Island, South Carolina
Disney Vacation Club Management Corp.	Aulani: A Disney Resort and Spa (2011)	Resort located in Kapolei, Hawaii
Disney Vacation Club Management Corp.	Hotels at the major resorts are involved and are listed under their respective resorts, see Disney Vacation Club article	
Golden Oak Realty	Golden Oak at Walt Disney World Resort	
Storyliving by Disney	Disney Living Development, Inc. (previously Disney Vacation Development, Inc.)	Cotino, in Rancho Mirage, California, is the first planned Storyliving by Disney development.

== ESPN, LLC ==
72% equity holding; 18% owned by Hearst Corporation and 10% owned by National Football League

- CTV Specialty Television (with Bell Media, who owns 20%)
  - CTV Nature Channel (jointly owned with Bell Media, 20%; formerly Discovery Science)
  - CTV Speed Channel (jointly owned with Bell Media, 20%; formerly Discovery Velocity)
  - CTV Wild Channel (jointly owned with BBC Studios, 10% and Bell Media, 10%; formerly Animal Planet)
  - Réseau des sports (RDS) (20%)
    - RDS2
    - RDS Info
  - The Sports Network (TSN) (20%)
    - TSN1
    - TSN2
    - TSN3
    - TSN4
    - TSN5
- ESPN
- ESPN (ESPN's DTC streaming service)
- ESPN2
- ESPN+ (rebranded as the ESPN Select)
- ESPN.com
- ESPNews
- ESPN Books
- ESPN Deportes
- ESPN Digital Center
- ESPN Events
- ESPN FC
- Cricinfo
- ESPN Films
- ESPN Home Entertainment
- ESPN International
- ESPN Now
- ESPN on ABC
- ESPN Outdoors
- ESPN PPV
- ESPN Radio
- ESPNU
- ESPY Award
- ACC Network
- Andscape
- J Sports (3%)
- SEC Network
- SECN+
- NFL Media
  - NFL Fantasy
  - NFL Network
  - NFL RedZone

== Shared services ==
These are services shared between Disney Entertainment and ESPN segments

- Product and Technology
- Disney Platform Distribution
- Disney Advertising Sales
  - Disney CreativeWorks
  - Disney XP
  - Project Elevate

== Others ==
- BVCC, Inc. (Buena Vista Construction Company) Disney World general contractor
- Cover Concepts, Inc.
- Disney Accelerator
- Disney Character Voices International
- Disney Institute, the professional development and external training arm
- Disney Rewards, Disney Credit Card service by Chase Bank
  - Disney Credit Card Services, Inc.
- Disney Programs
  - Disney College Program
  - Disney International Programs
  - Disney Alumni Association
- Disney Legends
  - Golden Pass
- Disney University
- Disney Worldwide Outreach Program
- Marvel Characters, Inc.
- Marvel New Media
- Marvel Entertainment International Limited (United Kingdom)
- Marvel Internet Productions LLC (Delaware)
- Marvel Property, Inc. (Delaware)
- Marvel International Character Holdings LLC (Delaware)
- MRV, Inc. (Delaware)
- Marvel Toys Limited (Hong Kong)
- MVL International C.V. (The Netherlands)
- Marvel Characters B.V. (The Netherlands)
- Marvel Universe
  - Marvel Toys Limited (Hong Kong)
- National Geographic Partners (73% majority holding; 27% owned by the National Geographic Society)
- Pixar RenderMan
- Presto
- Silver Creek Pictures, Inc.
- Webtoon Entertainment (2%)

=== Property holding companies ===
- Carousel Holdings EAT LLC, Carousel Inn & Suites, Anaheim, California
- Axman Realty Corp.
- Boss Realty, Inc.
- Commercial Apartment Properties, Inc.
- The Celebration Co.
- Disney Keystone Properties, Inc.
- Disney Realty, Inc.
- Dutchman Realty, Inc.
- The Dolphin Hotel, Inc.
- Homestead Homes, Inc.
- The Little Lake Bryan Co.
- Maple Leaf Commercial Properties, Inc.
- The Swan Hotel, Inc.
- Walt Disney Properties Corp.
- Buena Vista Street, Burbank CA
  - Pine Woods Properties, Inc.
  - Holmes Houses, Inc.
  - Key Bridge Properties, Inc.
- Florida properties
  - Lake Bryan, Inc.
  - Madeira Land Co., Inc.
  - Magnolia Creek Development Co.

=== Financial ===
- Arvida Disney Financial Services Inc.
  - Arvida Real Estate Capital Inc., a commercial real estate investment banking subsidiary to arrange financing for commercial, industrial and retail projects

=== Venture capital ===
Steamboat Ventures: ownership positions not revealed

- Baynote
- Chukong Technologies
- EdgeCast
- Elemental Technologies
- EMN8
- Fanzter, Inc.
- Fastclick
- FreeWheel
- GameSalad
- GoPro
- Greystripe
- Kapow Software
- MediaBank
- MerchantCircle
- Passenger
- Photobucket
- RazorGator
- Vobile
- VoodooVox
- Zettics

==== Chinese holdings ====
- 51Fanli
- Bokecc
- Cocoa China
- Gridsum Technology
- Netmovie
- Shangpin
- Troodon
- UUSee
- Yoyi Media
- YY

=== Unsorted ===
- 2139 Empire Avenue Corp.
- Alameda Payroll, Inc.
- Andes Productions, Inc.
- Animation Collectors, Inc.
- BVHV Services
- Before & After Productions, Inc.
- Berl Holding Co.
- Billy B. Productions, Inc.
- Blue Note Management Corp.
- Buena Vista Catalog Co.
- Buena Vista Laboratories, Inc.
- Buena Vista Trading Co.
- C.A. Productions, Inc.
- DCSR, Inc.
- Devonson Corp.
- Disney Art Editions, Inc.
- Disney Computer Magazine Group, Inc.
- Disney Interfinance Corp.
- Disney Media Ventures, Inc.
- Disney Research
- Disney Special Programs, Inc.
- Disney, Inc.
- ERS Investment Ltd.
- Entertainment Development, Inc.
- Film Brothers Property Corp.
- From Time to Time Inc.
- Hardware Distribution, Inc.
- Heavy Weight, Inc.
- Hodi Investments, Inc.
- Hughes Flying Boat Corp.
- IJR, Inc.(inactive)
- Indian Warrior Productions, Inc.
- J.B. Productions, Inc.
- Kelly Management, Inc.
- LBV Services, Inc.
- Merriweather Productions, Inc. (inactive)
- Montrose Corp.
- One For All Productions, Inc.
- Palm Hospitality Co.
- Plymouth Productions
- PNLH Payroll Inc.
- RCE Services, Inc.
- Stakeout Two Productions, Inc.
- Supercomm International, Inc.
- Swing Kids Productions, Inc.
- The Inn Corp.
- The Quiz Show Co.
- Theme Park Productions, Inc.
- Toon Town, Inc.
- Voice Quality Coordination, Inc.
- WCO Leisure, Inc.
- WCO Parent Corp.
- WCO Port Management Corp.
- WCO Port Properties, Ltd.
- WCO Vacationland, Inc.
- WDT Services, Inc.
- WDW Services, Inc.
- Wanderlust Productions, Inc.

=== Partial assets ===
- Inspector Gadget – Disney formerly owned the franchise as a whole during their limited partnership of DIC Entertainment from 1996 until 2000, before they sold DIC back to Andy Heyward. Disney also held international distribution to the original series outside North America through BVS Entertainment/Jetix Europe after their acquisition of Fox Family Worldwide in 2001, before selling it with 20 other DIC-owned programmes back to DIC in March 2006. Disney continues to hold the live-action film rights to the franchise through Walt Disney Pictures.
- Talking Friends – Franchise holder Outfit7 Entertainment signed an exclusive deal with Disney in 2012 that allowed the company to produce and distribute certain media for the franchise. Among the media created as part of the limited license included a web-series from Disney Interactive, two songs from Walt Disney Records, a Disney Create - Photo Mashup game that was available on Disney.go.com/create, as well as a concert event featuring Radio Disney DJs to promote the Talking Friends Superstars toyline. The deal, however, did not include the original apps, characters, nor merchandising rights.

== Former assets ==
=== Dormant or shuttered ===
The following companies or units are subsidiaries of Disney that are either no longer active or have been absorbed into another part of the company.

- 20th Century Home Entertainment – dissolved in early 2020.
- 20th Century Fox Home Entertainment Latin America – absorbed by Walt Disney Studios Home Entertainment in 2019, later dissolved in early 2020.
- 20th Century Fox Japan – Japanese distributor and catalog absorbed into Walt Disney Japan in 2019.
- 20th Digital Studio – dissolved on April 26, 2023.
- ABC (App) – FAST app for content from ABC. Discontinued on September 23, 2024, and merged with Disney+ and Hulu.
- ABC Kids – Replaced by Litton's Weekend Adventure.
- ABC Signature – Dissolved; operations folded into 20th Television.
- A&E (joint-brand): Dissolved due to Disney selling its 50% stake of A+E Global Media to Hearst Communications in 2026.
- Americast – Telephone digital TV joint venture.
- Anaheim Sports, Inc. - Formerly Disney Sports Enterprises, Inc.
- Angry Birds Star Wars – Crossover video game with Lucasfilm and Rovio Entertainment discontinued in 2019.
  - Angry Birds Star Wars II – Crossover video game Lucasfilm and Rovio Entertainment discontinued in 2020.
- Asianet Star Communications
- Babble
- Buena Vista Original Productions – Renamed to Star Original Productions on May 19, 2021.
- Bindass – Closed on March 15, 2025.
- Bindass Play – Closed in 2017.
- Black Rock Studio – formerly known as Climax Racing; acquired by Disney Interactive Studios (formerly Buena Vista Games) on September 28, 2006; closed on June 30, 2011.
- Blip Networks, Inc. – Acquired by Maker Studios (Now Disney Digital Network) in August 2013. Shut down in August 2015.
- Blue Sky Studios – acquired within 21st Century Fox purchase. Closure announced on February 9, 2021, closed on April 10, 2021.
- Bonnie View Productions, Ltd. – Production company for Crusaders, a syndicated news magazine show.
- Buena Vista Visual Effects
- Black20
- SIP Animation (formerly Saban International Paris) – Disney acquired Saban's 49.6% minority stake in 2001 and renamed the company in 2002. All remaining shares were transferred to BVS Entertainment in 2012, and SIP was shut down completely in October 2023, after being dormant since 2009. Trademark and intellectual property transactions were handled by BVS International N.V. after 2002. (Note: Currently, The Walt Disney Company France acts as a contact point for this company and its former assets.)
- Sullivan Bluth Studios – Folded into 20th Century Fox Animation in 1995, however its catalog is though not owned by Disney.
- Libra Pictures / Libra Home Entertainment – Saban's adult-oriented television/direct-to-video film production unit. The trademark rights were taken over by Disney and its operations were terminated in 2001.
- Jetix Europe, N.V. (formerly Fox Kids Europe) – 73% acquired with Fox Family Worldwide, Inc., full ownership obtained in 2009; ran 13 Jetix channels.
  - GXT – Italian channel for older teens sold in the management buyout of Jetix Italy, closed in late 2014.
  - K-2 – Syndicated Italian block also sold in the management buyout of Jetix Italy.
  - Jetix Consumer Products – Formerly Saban Consumer Products and Active Licensing Europe.
  - Jetix España S.L. – Joint venture with Sogecable S.A. to operate Jetix Spain.
  - Jetix Play – A pay TV channel broadcasting in Eastern Europe, rebranded as Playhouse Disney in 2010 and Disney Junior in 2011.
  - Jetix Poland Limited – Minority owner; a subsidiary of United Pan-Europe Communications N.V.
  - TV10 B.V. – Joint venture with SBS Broadcasting B.V. operating the Dutch Jetix channel
- Cal Publishing – Cal Publishing was a subsidiary created by Disney to acquire the assets of CrossGen. After the acquisition, both companies were folded into Disney Publishing Worldwide. Disney subsidiary Marvel Comics has since tried to revive CrossGen as an imprint.
- Canasa Trading Corp
- Caravan Pictures
- Channel [V] – Closed in 2021.
- Disney Circle 7 Animation
- Club Penguin – Closed on March 30, 2017.
- Club Penguin Island – Closed on December 20, 2018.
- Club Disney – Creation of Disney Regional Entertainment, Club Disney had 5 locations built in the U.S. All 5 locations were closed in November 1999.
- Walt Disney Feature Animation Florida, Inc.
- Das Vierte
- Disney+ Hotstar – Rebranded to Disney+ in Southeast Asia on October 9, 2025, and became JioHotstar in India on February 14, 2025.
- Disney Auctions
- Disney Cinemagic
- Disney Comics
- Disney Deluxe, streaming service which offered Disney, Marvel, Pixar, and Star Wars branded content in Japan.
- Disney Development Company: Construct arm.
- Disney Digital Network
  - Revelmode – Sub-network of Maker Studios/Disney Digital Network. Shut down after PewDiePie was dropped because of antisemitic jokes made on his channel.
- Disney English – Closed on June 22, 2020.
- Disney Interactive Studios – Closed in 2016
- DisneyLife, streaming service which offered some Disney branded content to subscriber's outside the US before Disney+.
- Disney Movie Club, a physical media distributor closed in Canada on October 15, 2023, and in the United States on May 20, 2024
- Disney Movie Insiders – Closed on September 1, 2023, in Canada and on December 6, 2024, in the United States
- Disney Networks Group Asia Pacific – Closed in 2023
- DisneyNow – FAST app for content from Disney Channel, Disney Junior, and Disney XD. Discontinued on September 23, 2024.
- Disney Regional Entertainment – Ran Disney Quest and the ESPN Zone Restaurant/entertainment chains. The division was closed in June 2010. Two ESPN Zones remain operating, but now as local franchises.
- Disney's River Country – Closed in 2001
- Disney TeleVentures, Inc. – Americast telco venture programming and technical support
- Disney Television and Telecommunications, division group (not to be confused with Walt Disney Television production division) eliminated after Disney-CC/ABC merger
- Disneytoon Studios
- Disney XD (international) – Most of the international assets closed due to the launch of Disney+ or intense competition from streaming service; Canada's closed and license failed quickly in 2025 due to financial pressure with Corus Entertainment.
- Dream Quest Images – Merged with Disney Features Animation computer group to form The Secret Lab.
- ESPN3 – closed on December 2, 2025
- ESPN Classic – closed in 2023
- ESPN The Magazine – dissolved in September 2019
- ESPN Player – shut down on August 18, 2023, in all international markets.
- Faded Denim Productions Ltd. – Defunct production company
- Fall Line Studios
- Fidelity Television, Inc. – owned KCAL-TV
  - KHJ-TV, Inc.
- Fogbank Entertainment – shut down in 2020
- Fox App – discontinued on December 31, 2020
- Fox (international) – assets either closed or dissolved into Star Channel or FX; closed in 2024
- Fox Animation Studios – closed on June 26, 2000, and folded into 20th Century Animation.
- Fox Digital Entertainment – Closed by Fox Entertainment Group in 2017, library owned by The Walt Disney Company, through Disney Consumer Products.
- Fox 2000 Pictures – dissolved on May 14, 2021
- Fox 21 Television Studios – dissolved into Touchstone Television, later Walt Disney Television
- Fox Consumer Products – folded into Disney Consumer Products in 2020
- Fox Original Productions – absorbed with Buena Vista Original Productions and renamed to Star Original Productions in 2021.
- Fox Life – Closed in 2024
- Fox Comedy – Closed in 2024
- Fox Crime – Closed in 2024
- Fox Movies – Closed in 2024
- Fox Family Movies – Closed in 2021 in Southeast Asia and in 2022 in the Middle East
- Fox Action Movies – Closed in 2021 in Southeast Asia and in 2024 in the Middle East and replaced by Star Action
- Fox Networks Group – Closed in 2024
- Fox-Paramount Home Entertainment (A Nordic joint venture with Paramount Home Entertainment) – Closed in 2019
- Fox Pathé Europa (French joint venture with Pathé and EuropaCorp)
- Fox Research Library
- Fox Sports International – assets either closed or dissolved into ESPN; closed in 2024
- Fox VFX Lab – Closed in 2019
- Fox Music – Merged with Hollywood Records in 2020
- FoxNext – Closed in 2020
- Fox+ – Closed in 2022
- Freeform (App) – FAST app for content from Freeform. Discontinued on September 23, 2024, and merged with Hulu.
- FXNOW – FAST app for content from FX Networks and 20th Century Studios. Discontinued on September 23, 2024.
- FX+ – Closed on August 21, 2019
- Harvest Groves, Inc. – Merged
- Hollywood Basic – Sub-label of Hollywood Records that released rap music (including music by DJ Shadow and Organized Konfusion). The label was discontinued in the mid-1990s.
- Hollywood Pictures – Film label of The Walt Disney Studios created in 1989 and shuttered in 2007.
- Hollywood Pictures Music – Label of Disney Music Publishing that distributed songs from Hollywood Pictures' titles.
- Hotstar – Streaming service rebranded to Disney+ Hotstar in 2020.
- Hulu – OTT streaming platform; merged with Disney+ and discontinued in 2026 within the United States
- ImageMovers Digital – Closed in 2011 after the abysmal opening of Mars Needs Moms.
- Infoseek Corporation – Acquired by Disney in 1998 and merged into Disney's GO Network. The Infoseek name is no longer in use.
- Jumbo Pictures – Acquired by Disney in 1996, Jumbo Pictures produced Doug, 101 Dalmatians: The Series, and PB&J Otter for Disney. The company was folded into Walt Disney Television Animation
- Jetix Animation Concepts – Folded into Walt Disney Television Animation in 2009.
- Junction Point Studios
- Kingdom Comics – The Kingdom Comics unit's creatives/executives moved its deal to an independent Monsterfoot Production.
- Lake Buena Vista Communities, Inc.
- LAPTV
- Lifetime Entertainment Services – 50–50 joint-venture ended with Hearst Communications in September 2026.
- Lifetime Radio for Women
- Longhorn Network – Closed on June 30, 2024, and folded into SEC Network
- Lucasfilm Animation Singapore and VFX Studio – Closed in 2023
- Lyric Street Records – Record label specializing in country music
- Malibu Comics
- Mammoth Records – Independent record label acquired by Disney in 1997
- Marvel Entertainment – Closed on March 29, 2023
- Marvel Animation (AKA Marvel Family Entertainment)
  - Marvel Animation Studios – Part of Marvel Animation from 2012 until 2020
- Marvel Toys (known as the trade name for Toy Biz, Inc.) – Closed in 2007
- Miravista – Production company for Buena Vista International in Mexico and Brazil, Dissolved in 2019.
- MovieBeam
- MLG Productions 1 – MLG Productions 8: (Marvel's joint venture with Lionsgate) operationally defunct as the agreed-upon number of DTV movies were finished.
- Nat Geo App – FAST app for content from the National Geographic Channels. Discontinued on December 31, 2019
- Nat Geo Kids Abu Dhabi – Closed on January 1, 2020
- Nat Geo Kids – Closed on April 1, 2022
- Nat Geo Music – Closed in 2017
- Nat Geo TV – FAST app for content from the National Geographic Channels. Discontinued on September 23, 2024, and merged with Disney+ and Hulu.
- NBA Experience – Closed in 2021
- OpenAI (equity stake) - Disney bought an equity stake in December 2025, exited in March 2026, due to the discontinuation of Sora.
- Pathé UK – folded into 20th Century Fox
- Pixar Canada – Opened in 2010, Closed in 2013.
- Playdom
- Propaganda Games – Shuttered in January 2011 after the development of Tron: Evolution was completed.
- Radio Disney Networks
  - Radio Disney
  - Radio Disney Country
  - Radio Disney Junior
  - Radio Disney Music Awards
- Ranch and Grove Holding Corp. – Merged
- The Secret Lab – Formed from Dream Quest Images & Walt Disney Features Animation computer group, closed in 2002
- Skellington Productions, Inc. – Production company formed between Walt Disney Feature Animation and filmmakers Tim Burton and Henry Selick
- Soapnet – DATG cable channel that closed on December 31, 2013
- Sony ESPN (50%, joint-venture with Sony) – Closed in 2020
- Sphero – In 2015, TWDC purchased a stake in the robotic toys company then approached them about building BB-8, the deal ended in 2018.
- Star Distribution – Retired and replaced by the second incarnation of Buena Vista International on January 29, 2026.
- Star Original Productions (formerly Buena Vista Original Productions (2019–2021) and Fox Producciones Originales (2015–2021)) – Absorbed to the second incarnation of Buena Vista International in 2026.
- Star (Disney+ brand) – Discontinued in international markets on October 8, 2025, and replaced by the Hulu hub, except in Japan
- Star+ – Merged with Disney+ in Latin America on June 26, 2024, discontinued on July 24, 2024
- Star Chinese Channel – Closed on December 31, 2023
- Star Chinese Movies – Closed on December 31, 2023
- Star Chinese Movies Legend – Closed on September 30, 2021
- Star Entertainment Channel – Closed on December 31, 2023
- Star Life – Closed on March 31, 2022
- Star Movies HD – Closed on December 31, 2023
- Star Movies Gold – Closed on December 31, 2023
- Star Premium – Closed on February 1, 2022, in Latin America and on March 31, 2022, in Brazil
- Star Wars: Galactic Starcruiser – Closed on September 30, 2023
- Starwave – Starwave was merged with Infoseek and acquired by Disney in 1998 to form GO Network. Starwave no longer operates as a stand-alone business. The label was recently resurrected to form Disney's Starwave Mobile which licenses content from third-party companies for cell phone content.
- Star World India – Closed on March 15, 2023
- Star World Premiere – Closed on March 15, 2023
- Star World Taiwan – Closed on December 31, 2023
- Tapulous
- Togetherville – Acquired in February 2011. Discontinued in March 2012.
- Toontown Online – Servers were closed on September 19, 2013.
- Touchstone Pictures – Closed in 2016. The label still used in-home media distribution of catalog titles.
- Touchstone Television – Folded into 20th Television in 2020.
- Toysmart.com – Controlling interest
- Take180
- UTV Software Communications – Merged with Disney Star in 2020.
  - UTV Communications (USA) LLC
  - UTV Motion Pictures – Closed in 2017
  - UTV Action – Closed on March 15, 2023
  - UTV Movies – Closed on March 15, 2023
  - UTV HD – Closed on March 15, 2023
  - IG Interactive Entertainment Ltd. – Closed in 2012
  - UTV Global Broadcasting Ltd.
  - UTV Games Ltd. – Closed in 2015
  - UTV Indiagames – Closed in 2015
  - UTV Ignition Games – Closed in 2012
  - UTV Toons
- Viajar – Closed in 2021
- Voyage – Closed in 2020
- Walt Disney Studios Home Entertainment Physical Media Distribution (Australia) – Closed in 2023
- Walt Disney Television – transferred to ABC Television Network, and later folded into Touchstone Television (then ABC Studios and later ABC Signature).
- WatchESPN – Shut down on July 1, 2019
- Walt Disney Studios Home Entertainment Latin America – Became dormant in late 2023 as Disney discontinued physical home media distribution in Latin American markets.
- Walt Disney Studios Home Entertainment (as a self distributor) – dissolved in April 2026, with Disney's library being fully distributed by Sony Pictures Home Entertainment.
- Wideload Games
- Wizzer Productions, Inc. – Production company for the 101 Dalmatians live-action movie.
- Xee – Closed in 2022
- YourTV – Closed in 2019

=== Divested ===
- 28 Days Later – Rights reverted to Alex Garland and bought by Sony Pictures Releasing in 2024 with the film 28 Years Later.
- A+E Global Media (50%) – Acquired as part of the Capital Cities/ABC acquisition in 1996, sold to Hearst Communications for $1 billion in September 2026.
  - A+E Studios
  - Philo (stake)
  - A&E
  - Crime & Investigation Network
  - FYI (formerly The Biography Channel)
  - The History Network
    - History en Español
    - Military History Channel
  - Lifetime
    - LMN (formerly Lifetime Movie Network)
    - LRW (formerly Lifetime Real Women)
- ABC Radio Networks, a radio network, along with ABC's non-radio Disney and ESPN stations sold to Citadel Broadcasting with the network renamed as Citadel Media, and later sold to Cumulus Media and renamed as Cumulus Media Networks before being merged into Westwood One.
- ABC Spark – (licensed only; owned by Corus Entertainment) – Closed on September 1, 2025
- Anaheim Ducks – Sold to the Samuelis in 2005
- Arena Football League – ESPN bought a minority share of the league in December 2006; the league ceased operations in July 2009. The AFL was revived in 2010, but is a separate legal entity from the original, with no Disney ownership.
- Avalanche Software – Closed in May 2016 and re-opened and acquired by Warner Bros. Interactive Entertainment in January 2017, now owned by Skydance Corporation.
- Baby Einstein – Acquired by The Walt Disney Company in November 2001, sold to Kids II, Inc. in October 2013.
- Bass Anglers Sportsman Society – Sold by ESPN to Don Logan, Jim Copeland, and Jerry McKinnis in late 2010.
- Childcraft Education Corp., maker of children's furniture and equipment, retail stores and sold to U.S. Office Products Co. in 1997
  - Childcraft, Inc.: catalog company
- Boom! Studios (minority stake) – Acquired as part of 21st Century purchase in March 2019, sold to Random House in 2024.
  - Archaia Entertainment
- Debmar Studios – Company held minority stake upon foundation in 1993, folded into Buena Vista Television in 1994, reestablished by company founder Mort Marcus in 2002
- DIC Entertainment – Acquired as part of CC/ABC purchase in November 1996, sold back to original owner in November 2000 and then Cookie Jar Entertainment.
  - Les Studios Tex
- Digimon (American investment and production rights) – Sold to Haim Saban, through Saban Capital Group in 2013; Disney still retains the ownership of Digimon: The Movie as part of the 21st Century Fox acquisition, while Hasbro bought a majority of assets of Saban Brands, Digimon was excluded due to corporate bottleneck pressure from its original owner Bandai.
- Disney Jr. (Canada) (licensed only; owned by Corus Entertainment) – Closed on September 1, 2025.
- Disney XD (Canada) (licensed only; owned by Corus Entertainment) – Closed on September 1, 2025.
- DraftKings (minority investment)
- DreamWorks Pictures (minority investment and partnership), despite former Disney CEO Jeffrey Katzenberg leaving Disney in 1994
  - DreamWorks II Distribution Co. LLC, film rights acquired from DreamWorks and Reliance.
  - DreamWorks Home Entertainment
  - DreamWorks Television (1994–2002) – Joint venture of CC/ABC with DreamWorks which was dissolved at the end of the seven-year agreement
  - Go Fish Pictures – indie film label, shut down in 2007.
  - DreamWorks Distribution, LLC – theatrical distribution arm of DreamWorks Pictures and DreamWorks Animation
  - DW Funding LLC – library holder of live-action DreamWorks films
- E! – part owner, 39.5% share sold back to Comcast in 2006 and continued to be independently owned by Comcast, then spun off to a new publicly traded company called Versant.
  - Style Network
- Endemol Shine Group (50%) – Acquired as part of the majority of assets led by 21st Century Fox, later closed with Apollo Global Management and assets sold to Banijay.
  - Artists Studio TV Ltd.
  - Bandit Television
  - Cut & Mustard
  - Dragonfly Film and Television Productions
  - Reshet (33%)
  - Darlow Smithson Productions Limited
  - Endemol Shine Gaming
  - Remarkable Entertainment
  - Shine TV
  - Sidney Street
  - Sharp Jack TV
  - Kudos Film and Television
  - Simon's Cat Ltd. (The animated series Simon's Cat was deemed "non-unionized" for Disney's kids and family division)
  - Metronome Sparctus AB
  - Endemol Shine Australia
  - Endemol Shine North America
    - 51 Minds Entertainment
      - Truly Original
      - Authentic Entertainment (merged in 2025)
      - Endemol Shine Latino
      - Endemol Shine Boomdog
  - Endemol France
  - Endemol Shine Italy
  - Tiger Aspect Productions
    - Tiger Aspect Kids & Family
- ESPN Bet – closed in November 2025, licensing agreement with Penn Entertainment
- ESPN UK – Sold by ESPN to the BT Group in 2013 and continued to have licensing deals until a stake was purchased out, now jointly-owned by Skydance Corporation and BT as TNT Sports 4.
- Fox Corporation – spun-off to a new public media company solidifying FCC's Dual Network Rule.
  - Fox Broadcasting Company
  - Fox Entertainment
    - Fox News
    - Fox News Radio
    - Fox Nation
  - Fox Sports
    - Fox Sports 1
    - Fox Sports 2
  - MyNetworkTV
  - Fox Studio Lot
- FoxNext Games – closed, assets sold to Scopely
  - FoxNext Games LA studio
  - Aftershock Studios
  - Cold Iron Studios
- Fox Sports Networks – sold to Sinclair Broadcast Group and Entertainment Studios given that Disney could not own any of Fox's regional sports networks
  - Arizona
  - Detroit
  - Florida/Sun
  - Midwest (subfeeds: Indiana, Kansas City)
  - North
  - Ohio/SportsTime Ohio
  - South / Fox Sports Southeast (subfeeds: Carolinas, Tennessee)
  - Southwest (subfeeds: Oklahoma, New Orleans)
  - West/Prime Ticket (subfeed: San Diego)
  - Wisconsin
  - YES Network (80% equity) - sold to Sinclair Broadcast Group, Amazon and Yankee Global Enterprises
- Fusion Media Group, LLC, Fusion cable channel joint venture with Univision Communications, sold off the remaining 50% to Univision.
  - Fusion Media Network
- GMTV – part owner; sold to ITV plc and renamed ITV Breakfast Limited in 2009.
- Hachette Books – Sold to the Hachette Book Group which was formerly owned by Disney's rival Time Warner.
- KCAL-TV – Sold to Young Broadcasting, now owned by CBS News and Stations.
- KRDC – Acquired by Radio Disney Group in 2003; sold to Calvary Chapel of Costa Mesa, Inc. in 2023 solidifying Disney's entire exit in the domestic internal radio broadcasting business sector to focus on licensing music to third-party stations.
- La Chaîne Disney (licensed only; owned by Corus Entertainment) – Closed on September 1, 2025.
- Los Angeles Angels – Sold to Arte Moreno in 2003.
- Miramax Films – Acquired by The Walt Disney Studios in 1993. Sold to Filmyard Holdings in 2010 and then beIN Media Group since 2016, co-owned with Skydance Corporation since 2020.
  - Dimension Films – Retained by Bob and Harvey Weinstein and absorbed into The Weinstein Company when they left Miramax Films. Overseas rights, including the UK, to The Brothers Grimm were transferred from Miramax to Walt Disney Pictures outside the United States since 2015.
- OpenAI (equity stake) – Disney bought an equity stake in December 2025, exited in March 2026, due to the discontinuation of Sora.
- Oxygen Media – minority stake spun off, became independent, later sold to NBCUniversal in 2007 and became a division until spun off to Versant in 2026.
- Power Rangers – Sold back to Haim Saban in 2010, Saban held the rights until selling them to Hasbro in 2018. Disney still owns the old Saban back-catalog though and retained Saban's Diabolik and Masked Rider.
- Radio Disney Group, sold off individual stations
- Rede Telecine (12.5% each with Paramount Global via Paramount Networks Americas, NBCUniversal via NBCUniversal International Networks, Amazon MGM Studios via Metro-Goldwyn-Mayer; 50% with Grupo Globo via Canais Globo) – Sold back to Grupo Globo along with the other 12.5% stakeholders in 2024.
- RTL Disney Fernsehen GmbH & Co KG (50/50 joint-venture with RTL Group) – Stake purchased out in March 2021
  - Kividoo subscription video-on-demand (SVOD) service
  - Scoyo
  - Super RTL
  - Toggolino Club
  - Toggo Plus timeshift service
  - Toggo Radio
- Saban Entertainment/International (library) – Majority of television series and films from the catalog and licenses were either bought back or reverted to the companies or individual creators, while Power Rangers (in 2010) and the Digimon license (in 2013) were sold to Saban Capital Group because it was not prior to Disney's long-term goals and were eventually replaced by Marvel Entertainment and Lucasfilm to fit Disney's boy-centric/shōnen audience.
- Studio Ghibli – Partnership ended in 2013 and Disney sold the distribution rights to their library to GKIDS that year, currently owned by the Nippon Television Network Corporation
- Tata Play (30% stake) – Stake sold to Tata Group in 2024.
- Touchwood Pacific Partner 1, Inc. (not the limited partnership itself)
- TrueX – Sold to Gimbal, Inc. in 2020.
- Venu Sports (canceled 33.33% joint venture with Fox and Warner Bros. Discovery)
- Walt Disney Studios Sony Pictures Releasing de México: Stake sold to Sony Pictures Releasing.
- Wondery (minority stake) – Sold to Amazon Music in 2020.
- WJRT-TV, sold to Lily Broadcasting with WTVG
- WTVG, sold to Lily Broadcasting with WJRT-TV
- WXYZ-TV
- TeleColombia – Sold to Paramount Networks Americas in 2021.
- THX
- Who Wants to Be a Millionaire? – American production and distribution rights for ABC sold off and reverted to Sony Pictures Television.
- X Games – ESPN sold the majority stake to MSP Sports Capital in 2022 to focus back on its major games.

=== Venture capital holdings sold ===
- 56.com: sold to Renren in September 2011
- Iridigm Display Corporation: acquired by Qualcomm, Inc., September 2004
- Kyte: acquired by KIT Digital, January 2011
- Move Networks: December 2010 acquisition of EchoStar
- PopularMedia: acquired by StrongMail, June 2009
- Pure Digital Technologies: acquired by Cisco in May 2009
- Quigo: acquired by AOL December 2007
- Rosum: sold to TruePosition in December 2010
- Scrapblog: sold to Mixbook December 2010
- Sometrics: acquired by American Express, September 2011
- Youxigu: Steamboat sold its stake to Tencent Holdings Ltd. in March 2010

== See also ==
- Lists of corporate assets
- Timeline of the Walt Disney Company
- List of Marvel Comics characters
- List of Star Wars characters
- List of acquisitions by Disney
- List of libraries owned by the Walt Disney Company
- Acquisition of 21st Century Fox by Disney
- List of assets owned by Fox Corporation
- List of assets owned by News Corp
