= List of largest hotels in Europe =

This is a list of hotels in Europe that have 1000 or more guest accommodation rooms. Since 1980, the largest hotel in Europe is the Izmailovo Hotel in Moscow, Russia with 5,000 rooms divided between four buildings.

== Largest hotels in Europe ==
Disneyland Paris hotels

#	Name	Country	City	Rooms	Photograph
1	Izmailovo Hotel	Russia	Moscow	5,000	The Izmailovo Hotel is the largest hotel in Europe.
2	Barkhatnye Sezony (Note: Built for the 2014 Winter Olympics)	Russia	Sochi	4,688	
3	Cosmos Hotel	Russia	Moscow	1,777	
4	Royal National Hotel	UK	London	1,630	
5	RIN Grand Hotel	Romania	Bucharest	1,459	
6	Hotel Gołębiewski Pobierowo	Poland	Pobierowo	1,240	
7	Cabinn Copenhagen	Denmark	Copenhagen	1,202	
8	Gothia Towers	Sweden	Gothenburg	1,200	
9	Barceló Punta Umbría Beach Resort	Spain	Punta Umbría	1,198	
10	Pribaltiyskaya Hotel	Russia	Saint Petersburg	1,184	
11	Lopesan Costa Meloneras Resort	Spain	Meloneras	1,136	
12	Estrel Hotel	Germany	Berlin	1,125	
13	Disney's Newport Bay Club	France	Coupvray	1,098	
14	Hilton London Metropole	UK	London	1,059	
15	Park Inn by Radisson Berlin Alexanderplatz	Germany	Berlin	1,028	
16	Le Méridien Etoile	France	Paris	1,025	
17	Park Plaza Westminster Bridge	UK	London	1,021	
18	Cumberland Hotel, Great Cumberland Place	UK	London	1,019	
19	Disney's Sequoia Lodge	France	Coupvray	1,011	
20	Sheraton Frankfurt Airport Hotel	Germany	Frankfurt	1,008	
21	Disney's Hotel Santa Fe	France	Coupvray	1,000	
22	Disney's Hotel Cheyenne	France	Coupvray	1,000	
23	Ripamonti Residence & Hotel	Italy	Milan	1,000	

== See also ==
- List of largest hotels
- List of tallest hotels
- List of integrated resorts
- Rossiya Hotel
