= Antoine Grumbach =

French architect and urban planner

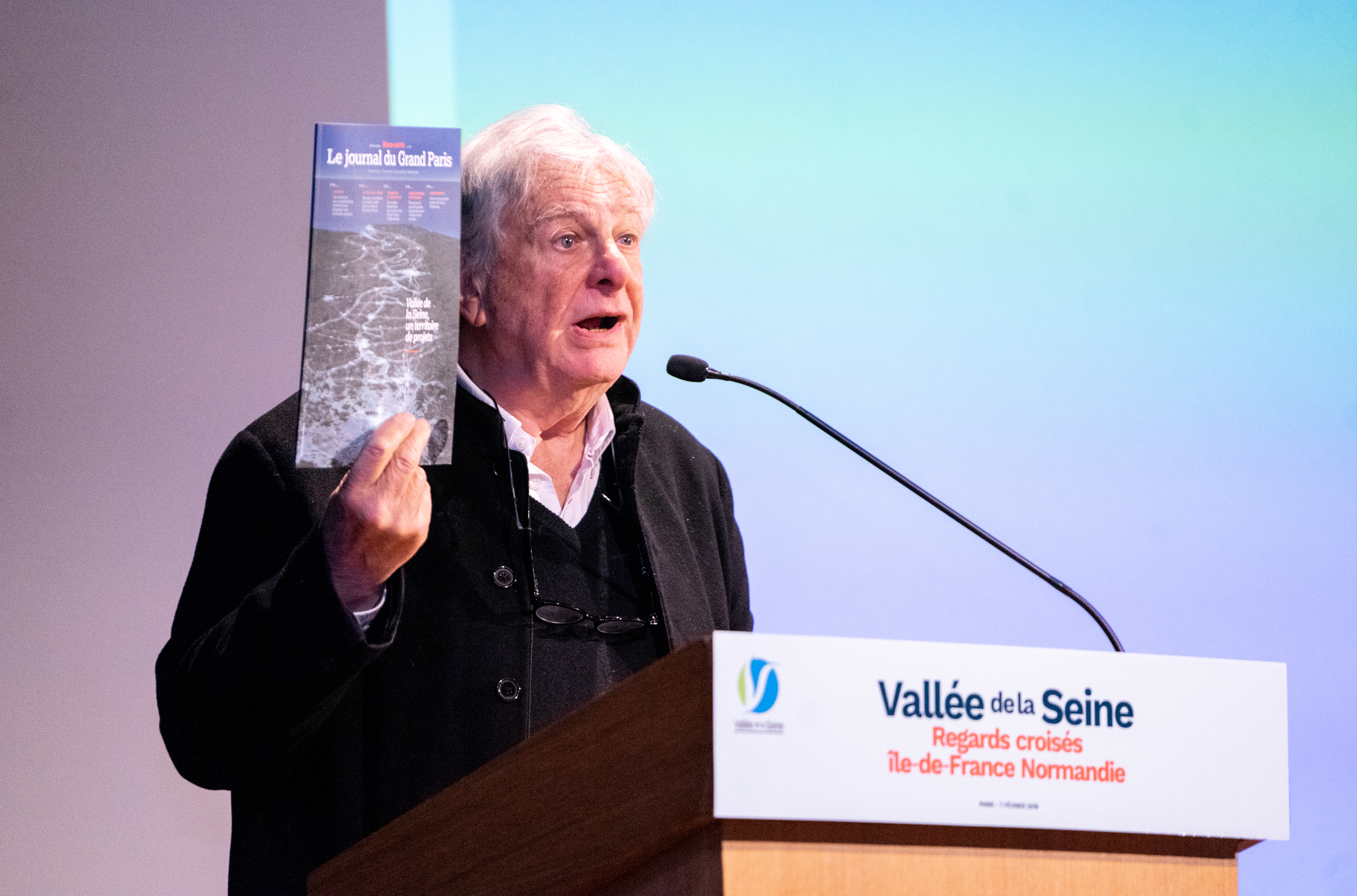
Grumbach in 2019

Antoine Grumbach is a French architect, urban planner and emeritus professor at École Nationale Supérieure d'Architecture de Paris-Belleville. Projects designed by him include Disney's Sequoia Lodge hotel at Disneyland Resort Paris, Bibliothèque François Mitterrand station on the Paris Métro, and the Les Yeux du Ciel (Eyes of the Sky) land art located close to Charles de Gaulle Airport.

Many designs by Grumbach have been conceptual or theoretical – such as a project on the future of Grand Paris.

== Biography ==
Antoine Grumbach is the son of Françoise (née Bloch), head of the anti-tuberculosis chemotherapy laboratory at the Pasteur Institute, and Jean Grumbach, a member of the Resistance who died for France in 1944. He was born in Oran while his parents were passing through the city on their way to join de Gaulle.

After studying at the Lycée Carnot in Paris, he joined the Beaudouin studio at the École des Beaux-Arts in 1960 before moving to the Georges Candilis studio in 1963. While studying at the École des Beaux-Arts, he prepared a doctoral thesis in semiology under Roland Barthes at the École pratique des hautes études (EPHE) and took courses with Henri Lefebvre, Lévi-Strauss, and Émile Benveniste.

Together with Christian de Portzamparc and Roland Castro, he edited the ENSBA’s journal Melpomène. He represented art schools at the UNEF and contributed articles on cultural issues to the journal 21/29,7. During his studies, he also served as the student representative on the commission for the reform of architectural education alongside Max Querrien and Michel Rocard. His student project for a Maison de la Culture, completed at the school, was selected by André Malraux. His 1967 thesis was one of the first to address the public space of a city (Montmorency). Following his graduation, he was involved in a DGRST research project on European cities under the direction of Professor Peletier and was commissioned by the Paris Urban Planning Agency (APUR) to conduct a study on the future role of the Les Halles district following the departure of the wholesalers.

In 1978, he co-authored the Palermo Declaration with Léon Krier, Pierluigi Nicolin, Angelo Villa, and Maurice Culot manifesto that rejected the capitalist and mechanistic logic of urban development in favor of a humanistic approach to urban spaces.

In 1980, he founded his own independent architecture firm, and in 1996, an architectural firm, Antoine Grumbach et Associés, through which he has carried out numerous urban planning projects in France (Paris, Marseille, Lyon-Venissieux, Bordeaux, Nîmes, Saint-Julien-en-Genevois, Saint-Denis, Bondy) and abroad (Berlin, Shanghai, Marrakech). He also designed large public spaces (Marne-la-Vallée, Aix-en-Provence, Nîmes, Saint-Denis, Saint-Julien-en-Genevois, Paris) and numerous public and private buildings, including residential housing (Paris, Berlin), public buildings (Poitiers, Saint-Quentin-en-Yvelines), hotels and university residences (Paris, Saint-Quentin-en-Yvelines, Eurodisney, Saint-Denis), and transportation-related complexes (Paris, Poitiers).

In 2008, as part of the consultation on Grand Paris, Antoine Grumbach presented the Seine Métropole project, in which he envisioned the development of the metropolitan area along a Le Havre–Rouen–Paris axis.

In 2015, he became a consultant through his company, AGTerritoires.
