= Golf Disneyland =

Golf course in Disneyland Paris, France

Coordinates: 48.857826°N 2.807994°E

Golf Paris Val D'Europe
- Interactive map of Golf Paris Val D'Europe

Club information
- Established: 1992
- Website: Golf Disneyland

The Golf Paris Val D'Europe (formerly known as "Golf Disneyland") is a golf complex co-operated by the Disney Experiences division, and it's located at Disneyland Paris in Marne-la-Vallée, France. The complex includes a Disney-themed golf course. Popular with adult visitors, it also has a children's section. Within the golf course is the Marriott Village. Other Disney Golf offerings include the Palm, the Magnolia, the Lake Buena Vista, and Oak Trail golf courses at the Walt Disney World Resort in Lake Buena Vista, FL.

== Presentation ==
Since its creation, the courses have been the property of Disneyland Paris, but since January 1, 2022, management was granted to Resonance Golf Collection associated with UGOLF. It was the largest golf course of any Disney property. However, this golf course remains far from the 5 golf courses at Walt Disney World Resort (Florida, United States) totaling 99 holes and two miniature golf courses.

The golf course is made up of a triple modular 9-hole course, making a total of 27 holes over an area of 91 hectares.

It also has a golf area for young people in the shape of Mickey Mouse and a 600 m^{2} driving range. The zones are named after the Disney universe:

- Hundred Acre Wood with Winnie the Pooh and his friends from the Hundred Acre Wood.
- Wonderland with Alice in Wonderland characters from Wonderland.
- Neverland with Peter Pan and the characters from Neverland.

The golf course had 18 holes when it opened in October 1992 and was expanded in August 1993 with 9 additional holes. Ronald Fream designed it.

The golf course also has a clubhouse designed by the architectural firm Gwathmey Siegel and Associates housing:

- Goofy's Pro Shop is a store for the equipment for playing golf and clothing featuring Disney characters.
- Clubhouse Grill: a restaurant.
