= Disney Hotel Cheyenne =

Disney Paris Resort Hotel

Coordinates: 48°52′27″N 2°47′32″E

- Interactive map of the Disney Hotel Cheyenne area

General information
- Type: Resort
- Location: Disneyland Paris
- Opened: April 1992
- Operator: Disneyland Paris

Other information
- Number of rooms: 1000

Website
- Disney Hotel Cheyenne

The Disney Hotel Cheyenne is a hotel located at Disneyland Paris. Designed by architect Robert A.M. Stern Architects (who also designed Disney's Newport Bay Club), it is devised to create the illusion that it is a Western town in the archetypal Hollywood style rather than a single hotel complex. This is accomplished through façades and other decor inspired by popular representations of the American Old West. The façades feature the names of such Western institutions as "Saloon", "Jail", "Billy The Kid" or "Annie Oakley". It shares an area of Disneyland Resort Paris with Disney Hotel Santa Fe, located on either side of a man-made river called the "Rio Grande". (The actual Rio Grande forms the border between Texas and Mexico.)

The hotel opened with the Euro Disney Resort in April 1992.

Around 1997, the hotel was surrounded by white "desert" sand and the streets were still largely covered in this sand, giving it the feeling of a quiet desert town. A few years later however the streets had been paved and the whole town was surrounded by pine trees. There is also a child's play area consisting of a wooden fort and three teepees within the town.

Before the pine trees were planted, Hotel Santa Fé was clearly visible from this area, because they were only separated by the Rio Grande.

Hotel Cheyenne was completely renovated from 2015 to 2017 and subsequently upgraded from 2 to 3 stars.

Cheyenne is a 10-minute walk from the resort's parks and there is a regular free shuttle bus between the hotel and the parks.

On 26 July 2020, Disney rebranded all their onsite hotels by dropping the possessive apostrophe. This meant the hotel name was changed from Disney's Hotel Cheyenne to Disney Hotel Cheyenne.

Due to the refurbishment and renovation plans at Davy Crockett ranch, Hotel Cheyenne has become the main hotel for Disneyland Paris discounts and offers, with offers in 2024 ranging between £112–£133 per person per night (based on 4 people)

== Hotel Extras ==
The Hotel Cheyenne offers guests the chance to meet Woody or Jessie each morning in the hotel lobby

Guests can also take advantage of the outdoor play areas and Pony rides during the warmer months. Pony rides are available for both adults and children

== See also ==
- List of largest hotels in Europe
