= Disney Davy Crockett Ranch =

Disney Paris Resort Hotel

Coordinates: 48°50′05″N 2°49′09″E

General information
- Type: Resort
- Location: Disneyland Paris
- Operator: Disney Experiences

Other information
- Number of rooms: 595 log cabins

Website
- Disney Davy Crockett Ranch

The Disney Davy Crockett Ranch is a campground at Disneyland Paris which consists of 595 cabins in a quiet, wooded area located outside the perimeters of the main resort.

The ranch is about a 15-minute drive from the theme parks. Cabins include a TV, double bed, a bunk bed and convertible sofa bed. It is similar to Disney's Fort Wilderness Resort & Campground at the Walt Disney World Resort in Florida.

== Cabins ==
The cabins are for self-catering stays and each cabin has private parking and a barbecue area.

1 Bedroom Cabins – a lounge with a convertible sofa, a separate bedroom with one double bed and a set of bunk beds (the bunk beds are not suitable for persons more than 70 kg (approx. 11 stone). The upper bed is not suitable for children under 6 years). All cabins have a bathroom with a bath with a shower head, self-catering facilities, telephone, television with international channels and radio. Kitchen: refrigerator, microwave, hob, crockery and utensils, kettle, dishwasher and washing up kit. Towels are provided.

2 Bedroom Cabins – a lounge with a convertible sofa, one bedroom with a double bed and one bedroom with bunk beds (the bunk beds are not suitable for persons more than 70 kg (approx. 11 stone). The upper bed is not suitable for children under 6 years). All cabins have a bathroom with a bath with a shower head, self-catering facilities, telephone, television with international channels and radio. Kitchen: refrigerator, microwave, hob, crockery and utensils, kettle, dishwasher and washing up kit. Towels are provided.

== Trails ==
The cabins are divided over a number of so-called 'trails':

- 101–197 Mocassin Trail
- 201–284 Wagon Wheel Trail
- 1001–1062 Timber Trail
- 1101–1176 Bobcat Trail
- 1201–1282 Big Bear Trail
- 1301–1360 Cherokee Trail
- 1401–1479 Tomahawk Trail
- 1501–1555 Coyote Trail

Each trail has its own "chalet" where breakfast can be picked up in the morning.

== Village ==
- Crockett's Tavern (restaurant)
- Blue Springs Pool (swimming pool)
- Alamo Trading Post (boutique)
- Saloon (bar)
- Tennis Court
- Davy's Farm
- Amphitheater
- Lucky Raccoon (video arcade)
- Bowie's Bike Barn
- Jogging Track
- Tree Top Trail Adventure

== History ==
The very first employees of the Euro Disney were housed in Disney's Davy Crockett Ranch (then known as Camp Davy Crockett). The Ranch was operational by September 1991, before the other hotels. Crockett's Tavern was the first restaurant to open on 2 February 1992 at the Ranch.

Disney Davy Crockett Ranch officially opened with the Euro Disney Resort in April 1992.

On 26 July 2020, Disney rebranded all their onsite hotels by dropping the possessive apostrophe. This meant the name was changed from Disney's Davy Crockett Ranch to Disney Davy Crockett Ranch.

On 12 April 2024, Disneyland Paris announced that Disney Davy Crockett Ranch would be refurbished, introducing a new theme around Junior Woodchuck characters.

On the 16th August 2022, Disney Davy Crockett Ranch received a brand new logo.

== Activities ==
There are many activities residents can participate in.

- Swimming
- Climbing
- Riding
- Safari
- Archery
- Basketball
- Pony rides

== Important event ==
=== Storm Lothar (26 December 1999) ===
The Davy Crockett Ranch suffered significant damage during Storm Lothar, leading to an extended hotel closure. According to testimonies, residents of the hotel were surprised in the middle of the morning by the violence of the wind and had to flee their accommodation in their pajamas to take refuge in the store (Alamo Trading Post) and at the reception at the entrance to the hotel. The Cast Members distributed warm clothes and socks to them. By midday, the 2,550 residents were relocated to other hotels at Disneyland Paris (Euro Disney Resort at the time), including the New York Hotel (now Disney Hotel New York – The Art of Marvel) and the Disney Newport Bay Club Hotel.

The storm also damaged the Disney Sequoia Lodge hotel.
