= Disneyland Hotel (Paris) =

Disney owned hotel in France

Coordinates: 48°52′13″N 2°46′47″E

General information
- Type: Resort
- Location: Disneyland Paris
- Opened: April 1992
- Operator: Disneyland Paris

Other information
- Number of rooms: 496

The Disneyland Hotel is located in Disneyland Paris, between Main Street, U.S.A. and Fantasia Gardens. The hotel is situated above the entrance gates and ticket booths for Disneyland Park, providing easy access to the park.

== Description ==
=== History ===

The Disneyland Paris Hotel opened alongside the Euro Disney Resort in April 1992. The luxury hotel is located within the Disneyland Paris resort in Marne-la-Vallée, France. It offers a range of room types, including standard rooms, suites, and family rooms, and provides amenities such as on-site dining options, a fitness center, and an indoor pool. The hotel is conveniently located right at the entrance to Disneyland Paris theme park.

=== Design ===
The Imagineers who designed the park's Main Street partnered with architecture firm, Wimberly Allison Tong & Goo on the project. The architecture of the hotel references Victorian American hotels such as the Hotel del Coronado.

=== Refurbishment ===
The hotel closed in March 2020 with the rest of the resort due to the COVID-19 pandemic. Instead of reopening, it underwent a major refurbishment, announced in April 2021. The refurbished hotel reopened on 25 January 2024.

=== Hotel Extras ===
Guests staying at the Disneyland Hotel can book special meet and greets with Disney Princess via the DLP App, and can see princesses throughout the hotel with the Royal Troupe

Guests can also take advantage of the exclusive Royal Kids club, Royal Dream makeover and much more. However the hotel's spa, fitness centre and indoor pool are available to all (including guests not staying at the hotel).

== Rooms ==
The Disneyland Hotel offers three levels of rooms along with suites:

=== Superior ===
There are 346 'entry-level superior' rooms located throughout the hotel.

=== Deluxe ===
The 82 deluxe rooms come with a dedicated check-in area and access to an executive lounge area.

=== Castle Club ===
The Castle Club consists of 41 rooms on the top two floors of the central wing, creating a "hotel within a hotel." Guests in these rooms receive daily complimentary breakfast with appearances by Disney princesses, access to a lounge with a view of the park, free soft drinks, and a dedicated elevator that takes them directly to Disneyland Park.

=== Suites ===
The "signature suites" offer a choice of themes:

- Tangled
- Frozen
- Sleeping Beauty
- Beauty and the Beast
- Cinderella

There are also two larger suites: the "Princely Suite," which is themed after Beauty and the Beast, and the "Royal Suite," inspired by Frozen.

== Restaurants and Cuisine ==
The Disneyland Hotel features two restaurants and a bar.

=== Restaurants ===
The Royal Banquet restaurant offers a buffet service, while La Table de Lumiere provides a table-service menu. Both restaurants include visits from Disney characters who interact with guests as they dine. The Fleur de Lys Bar serves lighter dishes, snacks, drinks, and an afternoon tea service.

==== Historic Restaurants ====
Before its refurbishment, the hotel was home to the following restaurants and bar, which have since been replaced:

- California Grill was an haute cuisine restaurant run by chef Philippe Geneletti. It was redesigned into the new Table de Lumiere restaurant.
- Inventions was a buffet-style character dining restaurant inspired by Jules Verne & Leonardo da Vinci. It was known for its weekly Sunday brunch with a changing theme. It was transformed into the Royal Banquet restaurant.
- Café Fantasia was a piano bar themed around Disney's Fantasia. It offered cocktails, coffee, and light dining options throughout the day. It was reimagined as the Fleur de Lys Bar.
