= Disney Sequoia Lodge =

Disney Paris Resort Hotel

Coordinates: 48°52′7″N 2°47′26″E

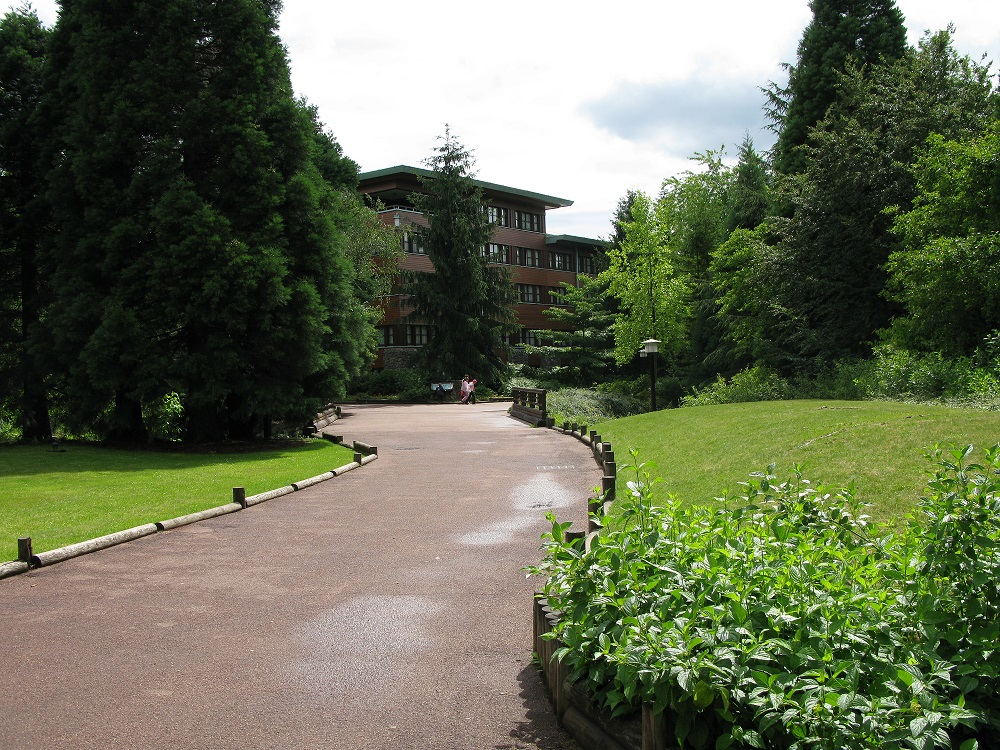
- Disney's Sequoia Lodge Gardens
- Interactive map of the Disney Sequoia Lodge area

General information
- Type: Resort
- Location: Disneyland Paris
- Opened: April 1992
- Operator: Disneyland Paris

Other information
- Number of rooms: 1011

Website
- Disney Sequoia Lodge

The Disney Sequoia Lodge is a hotel situated at Disneyland Paris. It was designed by French architect Antoine Grumbach to evoke the atmosphere of the American National Park lodges built around the beginning of the 20th century, such as the Old Faithful Inn (1904) in Yellowstone National Park and others in Yosemite and other Western National Parks.

The main lodge faces across Lake Disney towards the Disney Village and is home to many of the 1011 guest rooms as well as two restaurants (one of which specializes in grilled meat) and a hotel bar. Behind the main lodge are six smaller lodges, five of which contain the remainder of the rooms while the sixth lodge contains the hotel's swimming pool and leisure facilities. Surrounding the hotel are thousands of trees which were imported from the West Coasts of the United States and Canada, among with hundreds of Sequoias.

The hotel opened with the Euro Disney Resort in April 1992. On 8 September 1996, dozens of rooms were damaged by a fire.

- On 10 January 2015, a guest allegedly opened a window and shouted that she was Hayat Boumeddiene, who is wanted in connection with the Charlie Hebdo shooting that took place just three days earlier. The hotel guests were told to stay in their rooms, while other parts of the resort were evacuated and armed police called in. The woman issued a threat; however, it turned out to be a false alarm. She was taken into custody, and the resort resumed normal operations.

On 26 July 2020, Disney rebranded all their onsite hotels by dropping the possessive apostrophe. This meant the name was changed from Disney's Sequoia Lodge to Disney Sequoia Lodge.

== Hotel Extras ==
The Sequoia Lodge features special character meet and greets, where Goofy, Max or Donald Duck will meet guests in front of a season backdrop. The hotel also offers a swimming pool with a short slide, suitable for both children and adults.

== List Of Amusement arcades ==
- Marvel vs. Capcom: Clash of Super Heroes (1998) (Disney's Sequoia Lodge (2001))

== See also ==
- List of largest hotels in Europe
