= Disney Hotel New York – The Art of Marvel =

Hotel in France

Coordinates: 48°52′12″N 2°47′16″E

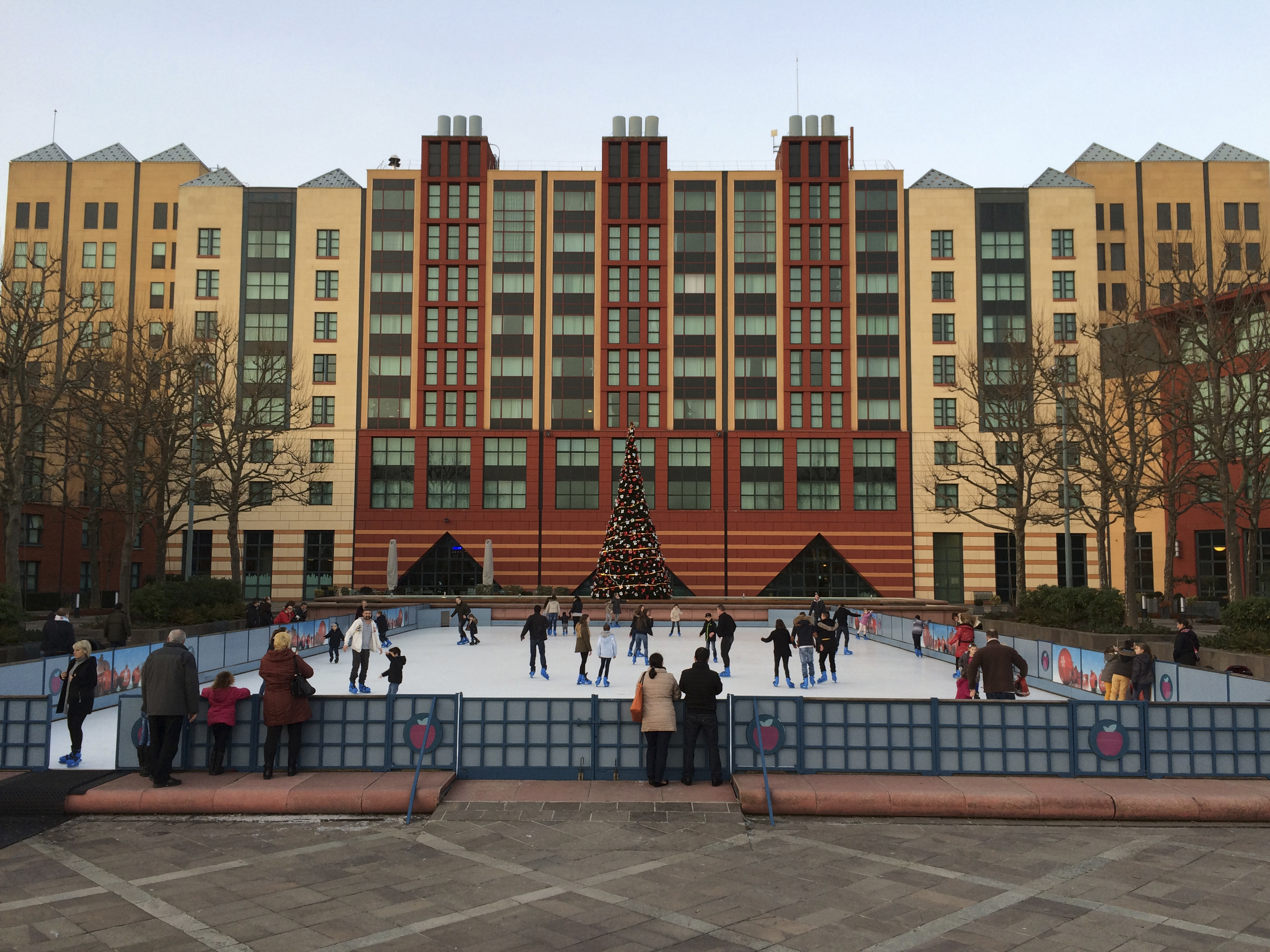
- The exterior of the hotel
- Interactive map of the Disney Hotel New York – The Art of Marvel area

General information
- Type: Resort
- Location: Disneyland Paris
- Operator: Disney Experiences

Other information
- Number of rooms: 561
- Number of suites: 25

Website
- Disney Hotel New York – The Art of Marvel

Disney Hotel New York – The Art of Marvel is a hotel situated next to Disneyland Paris. Originally called Disney's Hotel New York, the original hotel was designed by the 2011 Driehaus Prize winner and postmodern architect Michael Graves. Citing early 20th century Art Deco it was designed to echo the essence and feel of New York City. The exterior of the hotel itself is a stylized skyscraper-filled skyline. The hotel opened in 1992.

During the 2017 edition of D23, Bob Chapek, chairman of Disney Experiences, announced that the hotel would be reimagined by Walt Disney Imagineering to Disney's Hotel New York – The Art of Marvel. The reimagined hotel eventually opened in June 2021. A subsequent rebrand that saw the possessive apostrophe dropped took place in July 2022. This meant the name became Disney Hotel New York – The Art of Marvel.

== Retheming into The Art of Marvel ==
During the D23 expo of August 2019, it was announced that one of the suites of the hotel would be fully themed into Spider-Man, while the more standard rooms are more Iron-Man inspired. The hotel now houses the world's largest collection of Marvel art and features odes to Captain America, Spider-Man, Doctor Strange, the Incredible Hulk and other Marvel superheroes.

== Activities and dining ==
The hotel features two restaurants, the Manhattan Restaurant originally based on Manhattan's Cotton Club; now features many elements of the MCU including an Asgardian chandelier. Also, the Downtown Restaurant is an art-deco style buffet restaurant with Marvel comics adorning its walls. The Skyline Bar and Bleecker Street Lounge serve drinks and light snacks. Outside features Bryant Park; an event space based on the park of the same name in Manhattan.

A small gift shop, the New York Boutique, sells themed clothing, souvenirs, photographs taken with characters or on rides, the hotel's signature scent, bottled beverages, as well as a small selection of travel essentials.

Super Hero Station is a character meet opportunity for guests of the hotel, also featuring backdrops displaying scenes from Marvel Cinematic Universe films. An indoor/outdoor pool with a jacuzzi and pool toys is available. The Empire State Club once held Character breakfasts. A Disney character used to appear every morning next to the hotel lobby.

== Location ==
Disney Hotel New York – The Art of Marvel is the nearest to Panoramagique and Disney Village.
