= Disney Hotel Santa Fe =

Hotel in Paris, France

Coordinates: 48°52′21″N 2°47′41″E

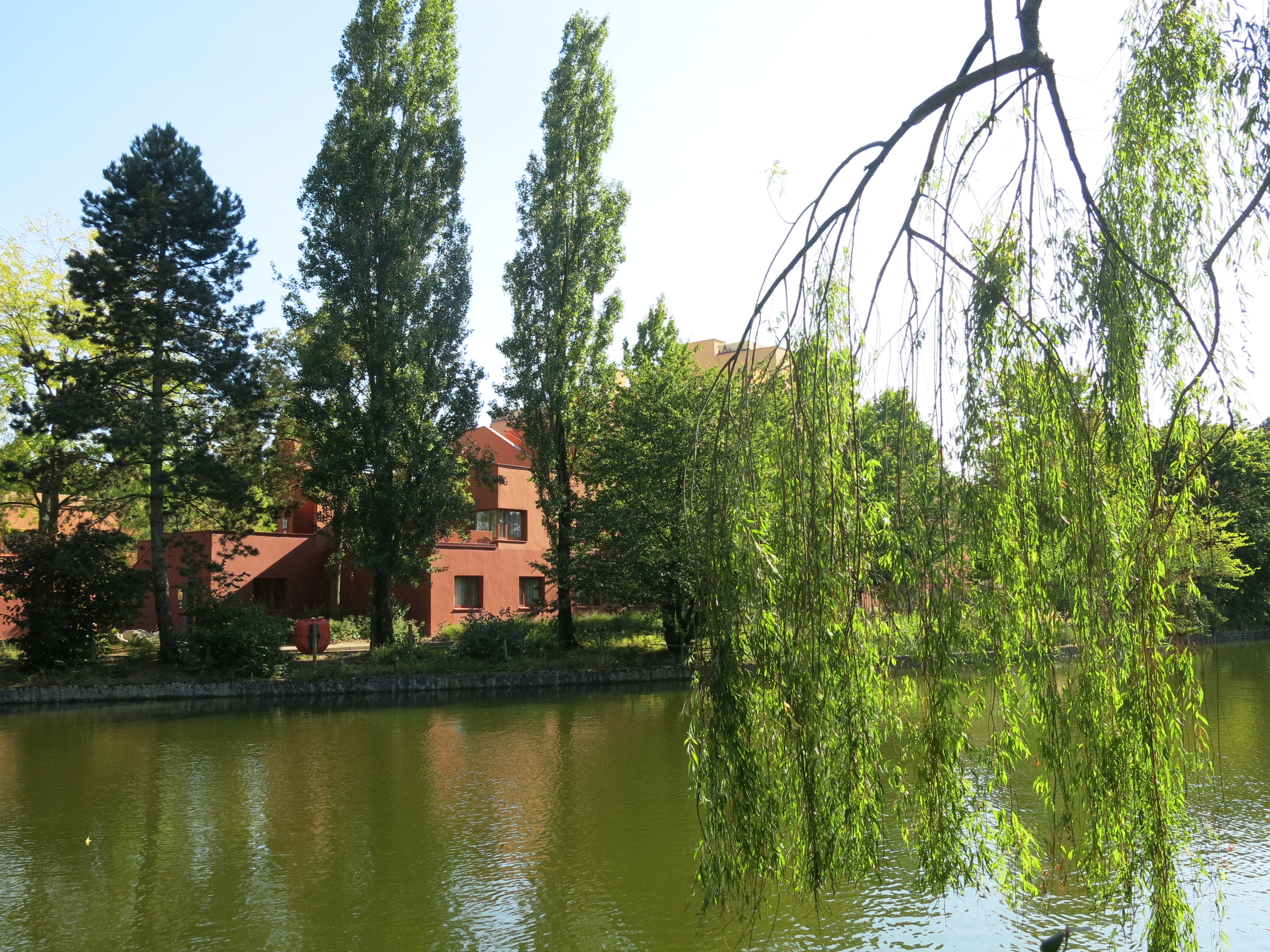

General information
- Type: Resort
- Location: Disneyland Paris
- Opened: April 1992
- Operator: Disneyland Paris

Other information
- Number of rooms: 1000

Website
- Disney Hotel Santa Fe

The Disney Hotel Santa Fe is a hotel at Disneyland Paris. It is designed by Albuquerque-based architect Antoine Predock, whose other work stands mainly in the American Southwest, to evoke the atmosphere of a motel in Santa Fe, New Mexico with its typical Pueblo Revival architecture. Surrounding the buildings is a desert-like environment in which cacti and decorative neon have been placed to further emphasise the American Southwestern theme. A drive-in theater screen is permanently displaying characters from the Cars franchise, and an intentionally derelict neon sign stands at the entrance. It shares an area of Disneyland Paris with Disney Hotel Cheyenne, located on either side of a man-made river called the Rio Grande.

The hotel opened with the Euro Disney Resort in April 1992.

On 26 July 2022, Disney rebranded all their onsite hotels by dropping the possessive apostrophe. This meant the name was changed from Disney's Hotel Santa Fe to Disney Hotel Santa Fe.

== Hotel Extras ==
The Hotel Santa Fe offers guests the chance to meet Mickey, Minnie, Goofy or Pluto each day in the hotel lobby, each wearing a unique outfit only seen within the hotel

Outside of the hotel guests can admire the Worlds Smallest volcano and indoor play areas

== Trails ==
The rooms are divided over several buildings (pueblos) in a number of so-called 'trails':
10–18 Trail of Artifacts
20–33 Trail of Water
40–49 Trail of Monuments
50–58 Trail of Legends

Since the grand renovation of the hotel and with the addition of the Disney-Pixar Cars theme the trails are called Luigi, Mater, McQueen and Sally respectively.

== Trivia ==
- Another example of recreated Southwestern pueblo architecture can also be found in the Disneyland Park: the Fuente del Oro restaurant in Frontierland displays massive adobe-style walls with protruding wooden beams and deeply inset windows.
