= Disney Newport Bay Club =

Disney Paris Resort Hotel

Coordinates: 48°51′56″N 2°47′21″E

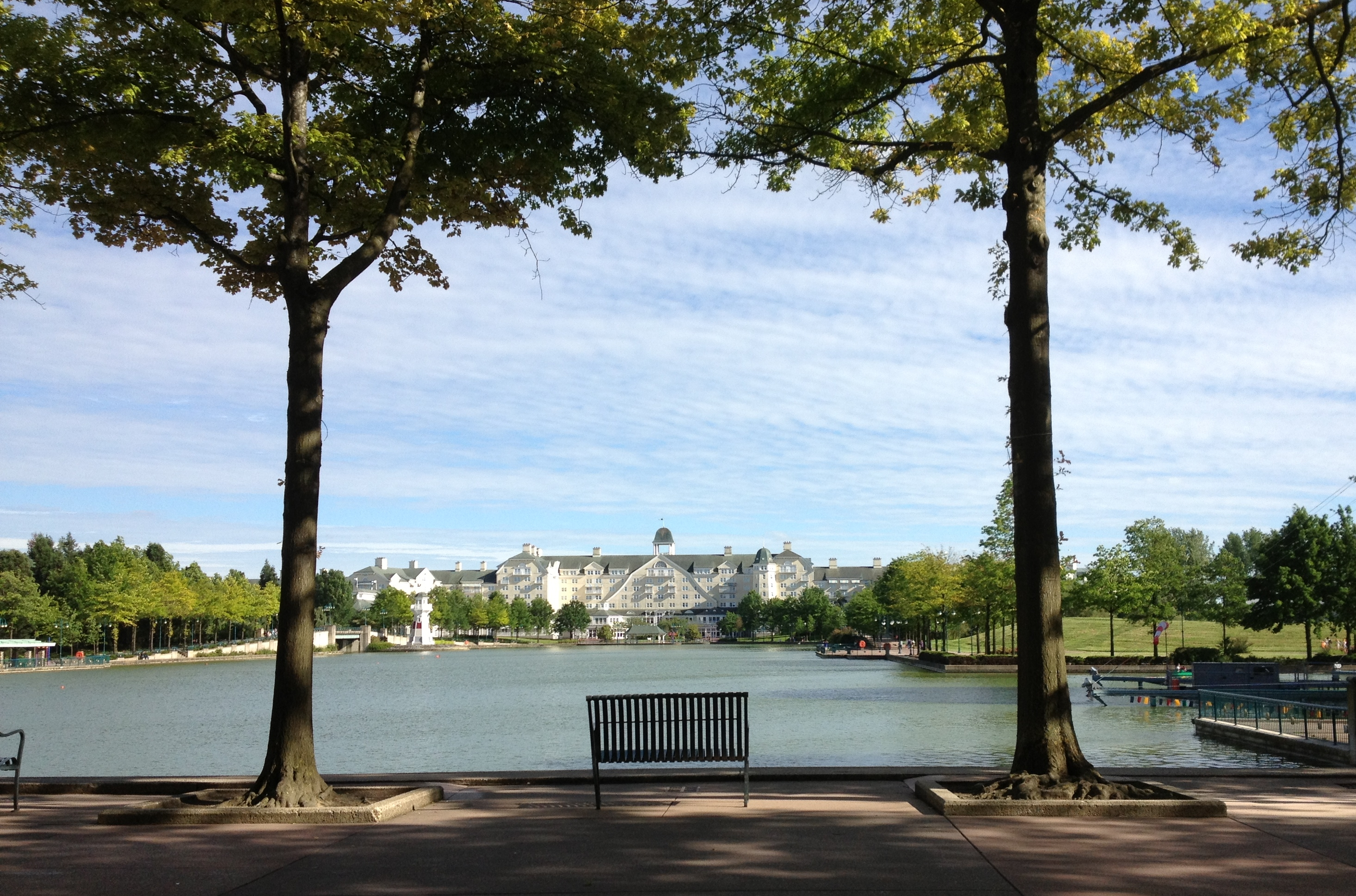
- View of Lake Disney and Newport Bay Club Hotel
- Interactive map of the Disney Newport Bay Club area

General information
- Type: Resort
- Location: Disneyland Paris
- Opened: 12 April 1992
- Operator: Disneyland Paris

Other information
- Number of rooms: 1093

Website
- Disney's Newport Bay Club

The Disney Newport Bay Club is a hotel situated at Disneyland Paris. It was designed by Robert A.M. Stern Architects and styled after archetypal New England architecture with its white clapboard exterior, porches, woodwork and nautical memorabilia. Its name was derived from the town of Newport, Rhode Island. Restaurants feature seafood and the hotel itself is built in a crescent shape around one extreme (or the "bay") of Lake Disney, which itself features a small lighthouse. It is the largest hotel on property and at the time of its opening held more rooms (1093) than any other hotel in Western Europe.

== History ==
Robert A.M. Stern Architects had previously designed two similar hotels which opened two years prior to the Newport Bay Club, in 1990: Disney's Beach Club Resort and its adjacent Disney's Yacht Club Resort share the late 19th century New England nautical theme at the Walt Disney World Resort.

The hotel opened with the Euro Disney Resort in April 1992. In this same year, the hotel was temporarily closed during the winter due to the low occupancy the resort hotels suffered during their early years. The hotel had not ceased operation since, until the COVID-19 pandemic in 2020.

On 26 July 2020, Disney rebranded all their onsite hotels by dropping the possessive apostrophe. This meant the name was changed from Disney's Newport Bay Club to Disney Newport Bay Club.

== Amenities ==
The hotel allows guests to meet Disney characters in their nautical outfits. The hotel also has a heated indoor/outdoor Nantucket Pool, the Little Captains’ Corner (an indoor children’s play area), and a range of adult-only leisure facilities like the sauna and steam room.
