= Disneyland Paris =

Entertainment resort in Marne-la-Vallée, France

Coordinates: 48°52′07″N 02°46′54″E

- Two icons of Disneyland Paris: Sleeping Beauty Castle at Disneyland Park and the Earffel Tower at Disney Adventure World.
- Formerly: Euro Disney Resort (1992–1994); Euro Disneyland Paris (1994); Disneyland Resort Paris (2002–2009)
- Industry: Amusement parks and resorts
- Founded: 12 April 1992; 34 years ago
- Headquarters: Marne-la-Vallée, France
- Key people: Christophe Murphy (president)
- Owner: Disney Experiences
- Website: Official website

Disneyland Paris is an entertainment resort in Marne-la-Vallée, France, located about 32 kilometres (20 miles) east of the city centre of Paris. It encompasses two theme parks, seven Disney-owned hotels, two convention centers, a golf course, an arena, and a shopping, dining and entertainment complex. Opened on 12 April 1992, the resort is operated by Disney Experiences, a division of the Walt Disney Company.

It is the second Disney park outside the United States, after the Tokyo Disney Resort, which opened in 1983. Disneyland Paris is the only Disney resort outside of the United States to be completely owned by the company. Disneyland Park, opened in 1992, is the original theme park of the complex. A second theme park, Disney Adventure World (then known as Walt Disney Studios Park), opened in 2002.

The resort is located on approximately 2,100 hectares (5,200 acres) of land which is being developed under a master agreement with French governmental authorities. About half of the land has been developed, including a planned community, Val d'Europe.

Disneyland Paris is Europe's most-visited theme park, and the largest single-site employer in France with 17,000 employees. It generated $343 million in profit for Disney in 2023. By 2022, 375 million people had visited the park.

== Ownership ==
The Walt Disney Company announced a €1 billion plan (equivalent to US$1.25 billion at the time) to rescue the financially struggling Disneyland Paris resort, the Financial Times reported on 6 October 2014. The park was burdened by its debt, which at the time was calculated at about €1.75 billion (US$2.2 billion), roughly 15 times its gross average earnings.

Up to that point, Disney only held a minority ownership stake in the resort. In early 2017, the company purchased 9% of Euro Disney S.C.A., buying 9% from Kingdom Holding and issued a tender offer of €2 per share for the remaining stock. This brought The Walt Disney Company's total ownership to 85.7%. The Walt Disney company also invested an additional €1.5 billion to strengthen and develop Disneyland Paris. In June 2017, Disney completed its tender offer and at the time owned over 97% of Euro Disney. It then implemented a full buyout of the shares they did not already own. In 2018, after taking full control of Disneyland Paris, Walt Disney reported its plans to invest €2 billion (US$2.47 billion) into the Disneyland Paris resort.

== History ==
=== Seeking a location for a European resort ===
Following the success of Disneyland in California, plans to build a similar theme park in Europe emerged in 1966 with sites in Frankfurt, Paris, London or Milan under consideration. Under the leadership of E. Cardon Walker, Tokyo Disneyland opened in 1983 in Japan with instant success, forming a catalyst for international expansion. In late 1984 the heads of Disney's theme park division, Dick Nunis and Jim Cora, presented a list of approximately 1,200 possible European locations for the park. The United Kingdom, France, Italy, and Spain were all considered. However, the United Kingdom and Italy were dropped from the list due to both lacking a suitable expanse of flat land. By March 1985, the number of possible locations for the park had been reduced to four; two in France and two in Spain. Both nations saw the potential economic advantages of a Disney theme park and offered competing financing deals to Disney.

Both Spanish sites were located near the Mediterranean and offered a subtropical climate similar to Disney's parks in California and Florida. Disney had asked each site to provide average temperatures for every month for the previous 40 years, which proved a complicated endeavour as none of the records were computerised. The site in Pego, Alicante became the front-runner, but the location was controversial as it would have meant the destruction of Marjal de Pego-Oliva marshlands, a site of natural beauty and one of the last homes of the almost extinct Samaruc or Valencia Toothcarp, so there was some local outcry among environmentalists. Disney had also shown interest in a site near Toulon in southern France, not far from Marseille. The pleasing landscape of that region, as well as its climate, made the location a top competitor for what would be called Euro Disneyland. However, shallow bedrock was encountered beneath the site, which would have rendered construction too difficult. Finally, a site in the rural town of Marne-la-Vallée was chosen because of its proximity to Paris and its central location in Western Europe. This location was estimated to be no more than a four-hour drive for 68 million people and no more than a two-hour flight for a further 300 million.

Michael Eisner signed the first letter of agreement with the French government for the 20-square-kilometre (4,940-acre) site on 18 December 1985, and the first financial contracts were drawn up during the following spring. The final contract was signed by the leaders of the Walt Disney Company and the French government and territorial collectivities on 24 March 1987. Construction began in August 1988, and in December 1990, an information centre named "Espace Euro Disney" was opened to show the public what was being constructed at the time. Plans for a theme park next to Euro Disneyland based on the entertainment industry, Disney-MGM Studios Europe, quickly went into development, scheduled to open in 1995 with a construction budget of US$2.3 billion. The construction manager was Bovis.

=== Design and construction ===
'Disneyland Hotel'. Through the hotel is the entrance ticket hall to the Park.

To provide lodging to patrons, it was decided that 5,200 Disney-owned hotel rooms would be built within the complex. In March 1988, Disney and a council of architects (Frank Gehry, Michael Graves, Robert A.M. Stern, Stanley Tigerman, and Robert Venturi) decided on an exclusively American theme in which each hotel would depict a region of the United States. At the time of the opening in April 1992, seven hotels collectively housing 5,800 rooms had been built.

An entertainment, shopping, and dining complex based on Walt Disney World's Downtown Disney was designed by Frank Gehry.

With its towers of oxidised silver and bronze-coloured stainless steel under a canopy of lights, it opened as Festival Disney. For a projected daily attendance of 55,000, Euro Disney planned to serve an estimated 14,000 people per hour inside the Euro Disneyland park. To accomplish this, 29 restaurants were built inside the park (with a further 11 restaurants built at the Euro Disney resort hotels and five at Festival Disney). Menus and prices were varied with an American flavor predominant and Disney's precedent of not serving alcoholic beverages was continued in the park.

2,300 patio seats (30% of park seating) were installed to satisfy Europeans' expected preference of eating outdoors in good weather. In test kitchens at Walt Disney World, recipes were adapted for European tastes. Walter Meyer, executive chef for menu development at Euro Disney and executive chef of food projects development at Walt Disney World noted, "A few things we did need to change, but most of the time people kept telling us, 'Do your own thing. Do what's American'."

=== Recruitment/employment ===
Unlike Disney's American theme parks, Euro Disney aimed for permanent employees (an estimated requirement of 12,000 for the theme park itself), as opposed to seasonal and temporary part-time employees. Casting centres were set up in Paris, London, and Amsterdam. However, it was understood by the French government and Disney that "a concentrated effort would be made to tap into the local French labour market". Disney sought workers with sufficient communication skills, who spoke two European languages (French and one other), and were socially outgoing. Following precedent, Euro Disney set up its own Disney University to train workers. 24,000 people had applied by November 1991.

In 2011, the park provided 55,643 direct and indirect jobs in France. According to Damien Audric, Director of Development and the Environment, Disneyland Paris would generate 63,000 jobs by 2022. Overall, in 2022, Disneyland Paris was still Seine-et-Marne's largest employer.

=== Opening day and early years ===
Euro Disney opened for employee preview and testing in March 1992. During this time, visitors were mostly park employees and their family members, who tested facilities and operations. The press was able to visit the day before the park's opening day, 12 April 1992.

On 12 April 1992, Euro Disney Resort and its theme park, Euro Disneyland, officially opened. Visitors were warned of chaos on the roads. A government survey indicated that half a million people carried by 90,000 cars might attempt to enter the complex. French radio warned traffic to avoid the area. By midday, the car park was approximately half full, suggesting an attendance level below 25,000. Explanations of the lower-than-expected turnout included speculation that people heeded the advice to stay away and that the one-day strike that cut the direct RER railway connection to Euro Disney from the centre of Paris made the park inaccessible. Due to the European recession that August, the park faced financial difficulties as there were a lack of things to do and an overabundance of hotels, leading to underperformance. The failure of Euro Disney caused the cancellation of several projects like WestCOT, Disney's America, Tomorrowland 2055 at Disneyland and Beastly Kingdom at Disney's Animal Kingdom.

A new Indiana Jones roller coaster ride was opened at Euro Disney in 1993. A few weeks after the ride opened, there were problems with the emergency brakes which resulted in guest injuries.

In 1994, the company was still having financial difficulties. There were rumours that Euro Disney was getting close to having to file for bankruptcy. The banks and the backers had meetings to work out some of the financial problems facing Euro Disney. In March 1994, Team Disney went into negotiations with the banks so that they could get some help for their debt. As a last resort, the Walt Disney Company threatened to close the Euro Disney theme park, leaving the banks with the land.

=== Financial, attendance and employment struggles ===
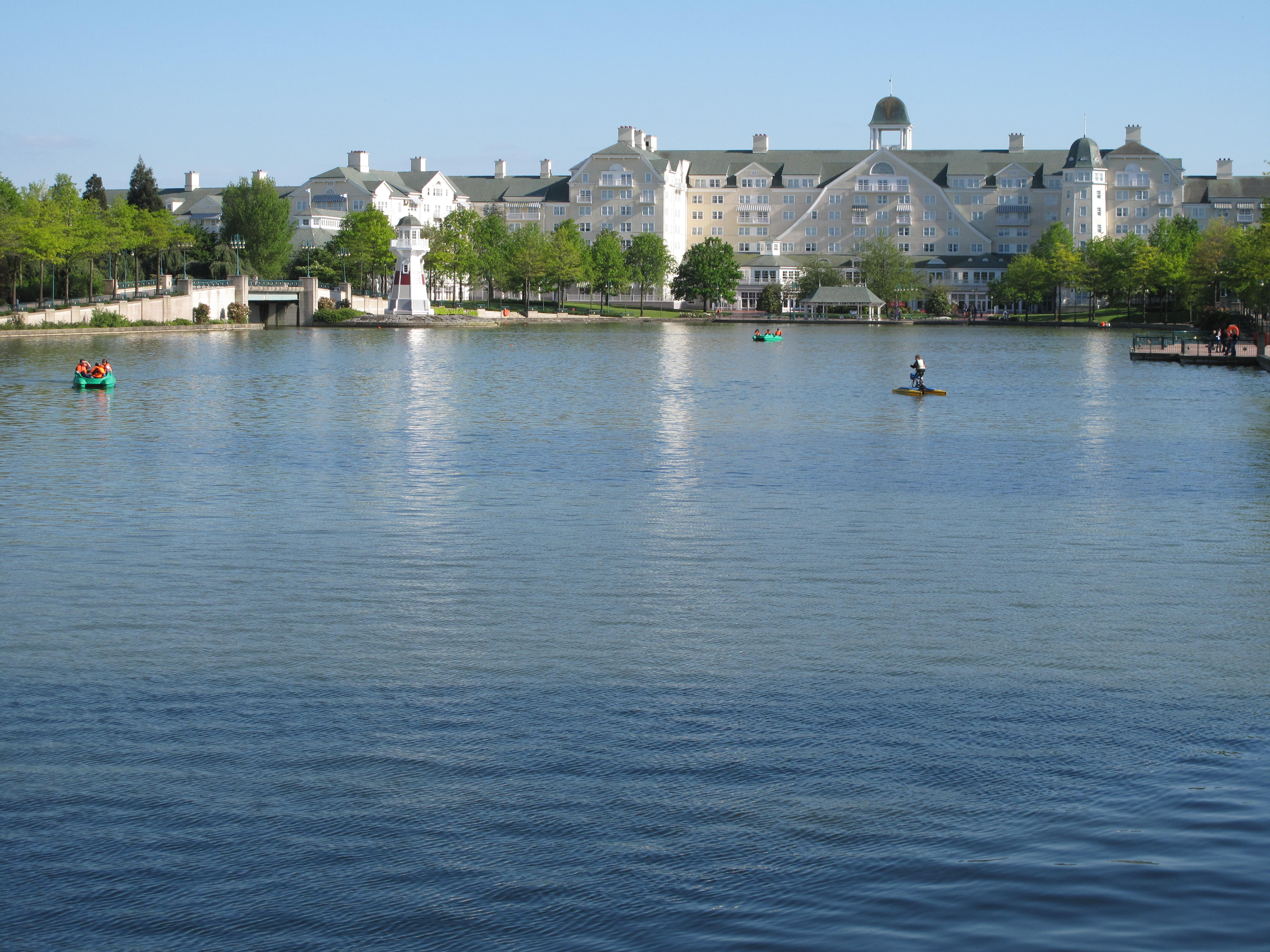
Disney Newport Bay Club

In May 1992, entertainment magazine The Hollywood Reporter reported that about 25% of Euro Disney's workforce, approximately 3,000 people, had resigned from their jobs because of unacceptable working conditions. It also reported that the park's attendance was far behind expectations. The disappointing attendance can be at least partly explained by the recession and increased unemployment, which was affecting France and most of the rest of the developed world at this time; when construction of the resort began, the economy was still on an upswing.

Euro Disney S.C.A. responded in an interview with The Wall Street Journal, in which Robert Fitzpatrick claimed only 1,000 people had left their jobs. In response to the financial situation, Fitzpatrick ordered that the Disney-MGM Studios Europe project would be put on halt until a further decision could be made. Prices at the hotels were reduced.

Despite these efforts in May 1992, park attendance was around 25,000 (some reports give a figure of 30,000) instead of the predicted 60,000. The Euro Disney Company stock price spiraled downward and on 23 July 1992, Euro Disney announced an expected net loss in its first year of operation of approximately 300 million French francs. During Euro Disney's first winter, hotel occupancy was so low that it was decided to close the Newport Bay Club hotel during the season.

Initial hopes were that each visitor would spend around US$33 per day, but near the end of 1992, analysts found spending to be around 12% lower. Efforts to improve attendance included serving alcoholic beverages with meals inside the Euro Disneyland park, in response to a presumed European demand, which began 12 June 1993.

A 1993 guidebook for those wishing to live and work in Paris, gave the following advice about the resort:

Euro Disneyland opened on 12 April 1992 & has staff of 12,000 including managers, secretaries, receptionists, hosts, waiters/waitresses etc, etc, filling in fact 1,200 different roles. 4,000 work in the theme park itself, 3,000 others work in the restaurants while another 1,600 organise entertainment in the hotels and other centres. Around 1,000 maintain hotel rooms and 414 furnished bungalows. Staff turnover is predicted to be sizeable. 11 million visitors were expected during the first year. Most of the staff will be given special training.

By the summer of 1994, Euro Disney was burdened with $3 billion worth of debt. Disney CFO Richard Nanula and Wall Street financier Steve Norris worked with Alwaleed's business advisor Mustafa Al Hejailan to rescue the overleveraged company. In that deal, Disney's 49 percent stake was reduced to 39 percent, the banks agreed to forego interest payments until 1997, Disney wrote off royalties and fees until 1999, and Alwaleed agreed to pay $345 million for a 24 percent stake in Euro Disney.

=== 1995 turnaround ===
On 1 October 1994, Euro Disney changed its name to Disneyland Paris. On 31 May 1995, a new attraction opened at the theme park. Space Mountain: De la Terre à la Lune had been planned since the inception of Disneyland Paris under the name Discovery Mountain, but was reserved for a revival of public interest. With a redesign of the attraction (which had premiered as Space Mountain at the Walt Disney World's Magic Kingdom in 1975) including a "cannon launch" system, inversions, and an on-ride soundtrack, the US$100 million attraction was dedicated in a ceremony attended by celebrities such as Elton John, Claudia Schiffer, and Buzz Aldrin.

On 25 July 1995, Disneyland Paris reported its first quarterly profit of US$35.3 million. On 15 November 1995, the results for the fiscal year ending 30 September 1995 were released; in one year the theme park's attendance had climbed from 8.8 million to 10.7 million, an increase of 21%. Hotel occupancy had also climbed from 60 to 68.5%. After debt payments, Disneyland Paris ended the year with a net profit of US$22.8 million.

=== 2000–2017 ===
In March 2002, Disneyland Paris underwent a second name change to Disneyland Resort Paris. That same month on 16 March, Walt Disney Studios Park opened to the public, coinciding with the 10th anniversary of the resort. In 2002, Euro Disney S.C.A. and the Walt Disney Company announced another annual profit for Disneyland Paris. However, it then incurred a net loss in the three years following. By March 2004, the Walt Disney Company had agreed to write off all debt that Euro Disney S.C.A. owed to the Walt Disney Company. On 1 December 2003, Euro Disney S.C.A launched the 'Need Magic?' campaign, which lasted until March 2006 to bring new, first-time European visitors to the resort.

In March 2006, Disneyland Resort Paris launched the advertising campaign "believe in your dreams" and paired with the TGV East European Line to encourage European family attendance to the resort. Shortly after announcing a 12% increase in revenues for the fiscal year of 2007, Euro Disney S.C.A. implemented a "reverse split" consolidation of shares of 100 to 1. August 2008 brought the resort's 200 millionth visitor, and made for the third consecutive year of growth in revenues for the resort as well as a record 15.3 million visitors in attendance.

In 2009, the resort started to recruit new employees, especially for the Christmas and summer seasons, which continued in 2010 and 2011 when 2,000 and 3,000 employment contracts being offered, respectively. The 2009 fiscal year saw a decrease in revenues by 7% and a net loss of €63 million followed by stable revenues at €1.2 billion in fiscal year 2010. Euro Disney S.C.A. refinanced their debt to Walt Disney Company again for €1.3 billion in September 2012.

A study done by the Inter-ministerial Delegation reviewing Disneyland Paris' contribution to the French economy was released in time for the Resort's 20th anniversary in March 2012. It found that despite the resort's financial hardships, it had generated "37 billion euros in tourism-related revenues over twenty years", supports on average 55,000 jobs in France annually, and that one job at Disneyland Paris generates nearly three jobs elsewhere in France.

For the first time in the resort's history, both the Disneyland Park and Walt Disney Studios Park closed from 14 to 17 November 2015, as part of France's period of national mourning following the terrorist attacks that took place that month in Paris.

In 2015, Euro Disney announced major renovations for 2015, 2016 and 2017 in preparation for the complex's 25th anniversary.

The Themed Entertainment Association considers Disneyland Paris to be the leading European resort in 2016 with a total of 13.37 million visitors. With two amusement parks and 5,800 rooms, it is followed by the Europa-Park resort with 5.6 million visitors and 953 rooms. The Spanish complex PortAventura World completes the rank top three in Europe. It features three themed-parks as well as 2,100 rooms.

=== 2017–present: Expansions ===
Disneyland Paris

On 19 June 2017, the resort's operating company, Euro Disney S.C.A, was acquired by The Walt Disney Company, giving them full control of the resort. In December 2018, Natacha Rafalski took over as CEO. On 1 September 2017 the resort's second nature resort opened as Les Villages Nature Paris.

On 26 March 2017, the opening of Star Tours: The Adventures Continue – a new version of Star Tours – marked the start of Disneyland Paris' 25th anniversary. On 31 March 2017, forums announced plans for Marvel attractions at Disney Adventure World as well as renovations to the Disneyland Hotel and Disney's Hotel New York in the next ten years. On 14 May 2017, to celebrate Disneyland Paris' 25th anniversary, the park welcomed actors from Pirates of the Caribbean: Dead Men Tell No Tales, for the film's European premiere.

On 27 February 2018, Walt Disney Company CEO Bob Iger announced that the company would invest €2 billion into the Disneyland Paris resort. The Disney Adventure World will be expanded with three new areas between 2021 and 2025, based upon Marvel, Frozen and Star Wars.

In March 2018, a Disney Parks West regional division was formed with Disneyland Resort in California, Walt Disney World in Florida, and Disneyland Paris under Catherine Powell, outgoing Disneyland Paris president. This mirrors the Disney Parks East regional division consisting of Shanghai Disney Resort, Hong Kong Disneyland and Walt Disney Attractions Japan and headed by Michael Colglazier. In September 2019, Powell exited her post as president of the Parks West division, with the division dissolving, and Disneyland Paris transferred to Disney Parks International.

On 1 June 2019, Disneyland Paris sponsored the Magical Pride Party, an LGBTQ celebration. Previous similar events have taken place at the park since 2014, but were not officially sponsored by Disney.

Natacha Rafalski was promoted from chief financial officer to president for Disneyland Paris in December 2018. On 15 March 2020, in line with other Disney parks and resorts, Disneyland Paris was shut down due to the worldwide COVID-19 pandemic. Disneyland Park and Walt Disney Studios Park reopened to the public on 15 July with the rest of the resort. On 29 October 2020, the resort closed again due to a second nationwide lockdown. Disneyland Paris reopened on 17 June 2021.

In 2022, Disney's shares in Villages Nature Paris were sold.

In 2022, Disneyland Paris celebrated its 30th anniversary. In March 2022, in celebration of its 30th anniversary, Disneyland Paris marked its 30 years with a nightly drone show entitled 'Disney D-Light' that was realized with the use of 200 drones and won the Park World Excellence Awards' title of the 'Best Live Entertainment of the Year' in 2022.

In the summer of 2022, to mark the park's anniversary in France, Disneyland Paris inaugurated the Marvel Avengers Campus, an area dedicated to the superheroes of the Marvel Universe, with the presence of the actress Brie Larson.

At the Expo of the International Association of Amusement Parks and Attractions (IAAPA), Disneyland Paris' 30th Anniversary Celebration was elected for the 'Most Creative Property-Wide Event, Amusement Parks and Attractions, Including Water Parks, Annual Attendance More than 1 million'.

In 2024, Disneyland Paris continued its multi-year transformation, including the Avengers campus and ongoing renovations at Walt Disney Studios Park. The resort reported record attendance of 16.1 million visitors for fiscal year 2023, narrowly surpassing previous highs, amid post-COVID recovery.

Walt Disney Studios Park was renamed Disney Adventure World on 29 March 2026, coinciding with the public opening of the World of Frozen land. This transformation is part of a two-billion-euro expansion plan announced in 2018, enticing a fresh creative vision for the park, from the behind the scenes of movie making to a complete immersion in fully detailed worlds inspired by the most famous Disney stories.

The World of Frozen land is a full-scale recreation of the Kingdom of Arendelle, featuring a 36-meter-high mountain, the Frozen Ever After boat ride, and a daytime show on the fjord. The area offers a royal encounter with Queens Anna and Elsa in their castle, and the debut of a next-generation robotic Olaf character that will make special appearances in the land.

The park's transformation also includes Adventure Way, a new main avenue, and Adventure Bay, a 3 hectares lake. New facilities opening along World of Frozen include the Raiponce Tangled Spin spinning ride (a carousel of swirling gondolas) and the Regal View Restaurant & Lounge, a table-service venue with an adjacent lounge. The lake hosts the Disney Cascade of Lights nighttime spectacular, featuring fountains, lasers, and a fleet of 379 synchronized aerial and aquatic drones. The show's score was recorded by a 90-piece orchestra.

An Up-inspired attraction is planned for a later phase in the Adventure Way gardens, while a dedicated The Lion King themed area, featuring a flume ride with next-generation audio-animatronics, is confirmed, with construction already started in autumn 2025. The expansion entails the creation of approximately 1,000 new jobs.

== Entertainment shows ==
=== Electroland Festival ===
On 8 July 2017, Disneyland hosted its first-ever EDM festival entitled Electroland, in celebration of Disneyland Paris' 25th anniversary. The second edition of the festival was held on 29 and 30 June 2018. The third edition, whose theme was based upon Disney's movie The Lion King, was held over a span of 3 days from 5 July through to 7 July in 2019. Disneyland also announced the fourth edition of the 3-day festival in 2020 starting from 4 July, which was cancelled due to the Coronavirus.

=== Disney Junior Dream Factory ===
In July 2021, Disneyland Paris launched a new show, Disney Junior Dream Factory, which lasts 20 minutes and whose theme is 'dare to believe in your dreams and they will come true'. A French sign language version of the show is presented every weekend.

=== Together ===
In July 2023, Disneyland Paris introduced its new show 'Together' which includes Dory, Coco, Buzz Lightyear and all the characters from Pixar films. It is a cine-concert that features a live orchestra with actors on stage, music extracted from the movies and original compositions.

== Other events ==
=== Minecon 2012 ===
From 24 to 25 November 2012, Disneyland Paris' Events Arena, the New York Convention Centre, and the Times Square Exhibitor's Hall hosted the 2012 edition of the official Minecraft convention Minecon which was attended by 4,500 people. During the convention, Mojang announced Minecraft's Redstone Update. The convention featured several Minecraft YouTubers as guests along with developers from Mojang.

== Regional impact ==
Disneyland Paris is the driving force behind the urban and economic development of the Val-d’Europe conurbation due to tourism brought in by the park.

Disneyland is also one of Europe's leading private tourist destinations with nearly 15 million visitors every year. After 25 years of its opening, Disneyland Paris recorded 320 million visits in 2017. The same year, it was reported that Disneyland Paris benefited the French economy by €66 billion in added value since its opening in 1992. It was also noted that Disneyland Paris contributed to the French economy through producing 56,000 direct and indirect jobs in 2017.

Disneyland Paris significantly contributes to the sector of tourism in France. Tourists visiting Disneyland Paris generate 6% of tourism revenue in France and 17% of sales in the Ile-de-France region. In 2023, it was reported that more than 375 million visitors have been to Disneyland Paris with an average of 50% French and 50% foreign.

== Environmental sustainability ==
Since 2019, plastic straws and bags have been replaced by paper equivalents and bags made from 80% recycled plastic. This is not the site's first eco-responsible initiative. In 2013, it launched a program to optimize water management. Since 2013, the park has had its own wastewater treatment plant, enabling it to produce 2,100 m^{3} of water a day from its wastewater. On-site treatment enables ecological and economical management. Being the only theme park in Europe to have this kind of installation, Disneyland Paris has saved over 2 million m^{3} of drinking water since launching the system.

In 2022, Disneyland Paris announced that a total of 82,000 solar panels would be installed, generating 36 GWh of electricity per year. Once complete, it will be Europe's largest solar canopy plant over its guest parking lot. The system will cover 17% of the tourist park's electricity needs and already includes 46,000 photovoltaic panels. The project is expected to help reduce greenhouse gas emissions by approximately 890 tonnes of CO_{2} yearly.

In September 2023, Disneyland Paris renewed its involvement in World-Clean-Up Day, the world's largest environmental clean-up campaign. Accordingly, Disneyland Paris encouraged its team and Disney VoluntEARS to take part of the initiative.

== Sponsorships and commitments ==
Ever since the opening of the park in 1992, Disneyland Paris has been a partner of the Pièces Jaunes operation. Indeed, the park also organizes visits for hospitalized children. On 18 May 2022, 500 hospitalized children and adolescents were invited along with their families to spend a day at Disneyland Paris.

== Awards ==
In 2020, Disneyland Paris was named 'Europe's Best Family Park' at the European Star Awards. The same year and at the same award show, Disneyland Paris managed to win other categories such as 'Best Dark Ride or Media Based Experience', 'Best Large Park' and 'Best Live Entertainment'.

In 2022, Disneyland Paris won the World Travel Awards' title of 'Europe's Leading Theme Park Resort'. Disneyland Paris already won the same award in 2016, 2017, 2020 and 2021. Also in 2022, Disneyland Paris won the title of the best 'European Amusement Park of the Year' during the Parksmania Awards. Spider-Man W.E.B Adventure was awarded the 'European Top New Attractions' by the Parksmania Awards as well. Designed specifically for the 30th Anniversary of Disneyland Paris, Disney D-Light was honored with the title of Best Live Entertainment 2022 at the Park World Excellence Awards held in London on 14 September.

== Name changes ==
Disneyland Paris and its properties have been subject to a number of name changes, initially an effort to overcome the negative publicity that followed the inception of the Euro Disney Resort.

1. 12 April 1992 – 31 May 1994: Euro Disney Resort
2. 1 June – 30 September 1994: Euro Disneyland Paris
3. 1 October 1994 – 15 March 2002: Disneyland Paris
4. 16 March 2002 – 3 April 2009: Disneyland Resort Paris
5. 4 April 2009 – Present: Disneyland Paris

== Theme years ==
1. 1st anniversary (12 April 1993 – 1994)
2. 5th anniversary (12 April 1997 – 1998)
3. 10th anniversary (12 April 2002 – 2003)
4. 15th anniversary (following premieres: 31 March 2007, The events officially began: 1 April 2007, 12 April 2007 – March 2009)
5. 20th anniversary (12 April 2012 – 2014)
6. 25th anniversary (12 April 2017 – 2018)
7. 30th anniversary (6 March 2022, 12 April 2022 – 30 September 2023)
8. 35th Anniversary (March 2027 – 2028)

=== Non-anniversary ===
1. Happiest Homecoming on Earth (5 May 2005 – September 2006)
2. Mickey's Magical Party (4 April 2009 – March 2010)
3. New Generation Festival (1 April 2010 – 2011)
4. Disney Symphony of Colours (8 January – 30 September 2024)
5. Disney Music Festival (19 April – 7 September 2025)

== The complex ==
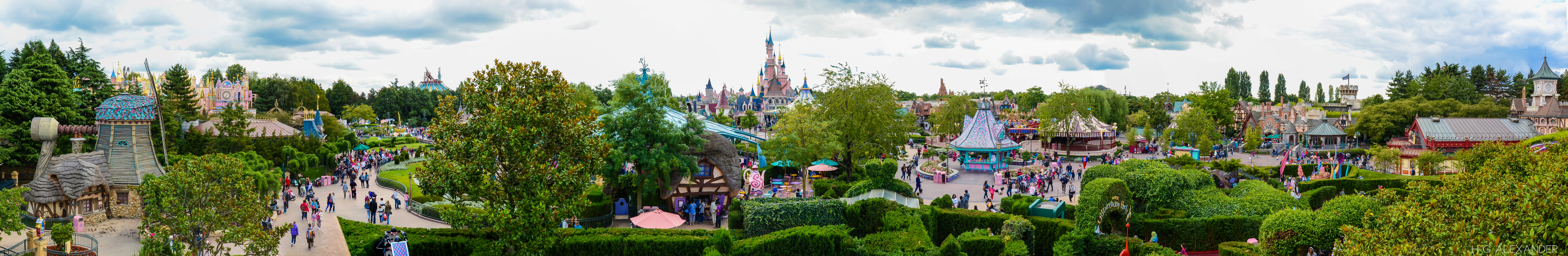
A panorama shot of the park from the top of the Queen of Hearts' castle

Disneyland Paris contains two themed-parks, an entertainment center, a commercial area and leisure activities with stores, restaurants and entertainment, as well as eight Disney hotels and partner hotels of the complex.

Disneyland Park (blue), Disney Adventure World (red) and Disney Village (yellow) inside the Disneyland Paris resort

=== Parks ===
- Disneyland Park opened with the resort on 12 April 1992 and is based on a larger scale of the original Disneyland in California and the Magic Kingdom in Florida.
- Disney Adventure World opened on 16 March 2002, celebrating show business, and immersive areas from Disney, Pixar and Marvel films.

=== Shopping, dining, and entertainment ===
- Disney Village, an entertainment district containing a variety of restaurants, entertainment venues, and shops.
- Val d'Europe, a shopping centre with a variety of outlet shops and large department stores.
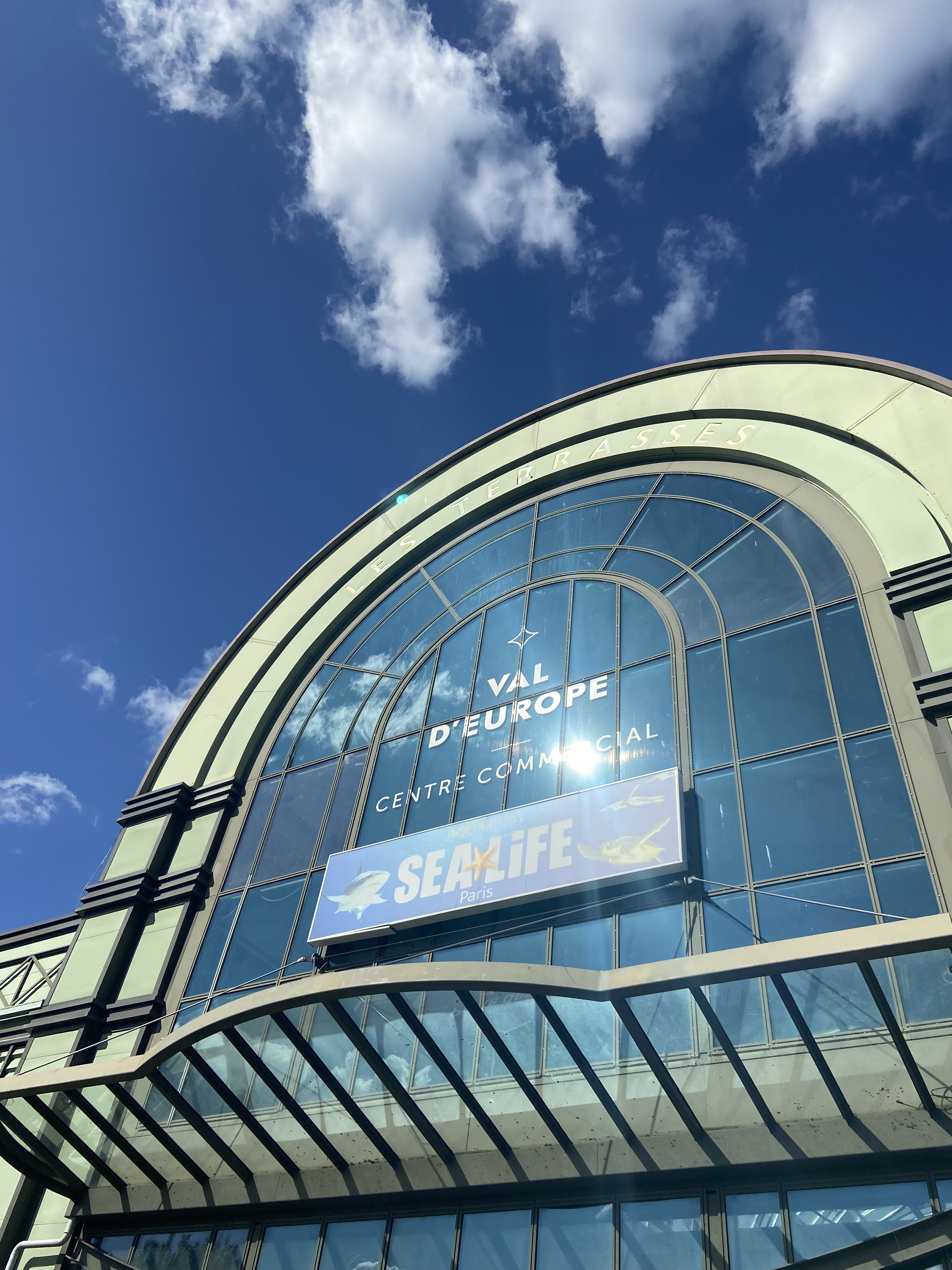
  Outside of Val d’Europe shopping centre

=== Attractions ===
According to the Disneyland Paris website the theme park's top five attractions in Disneyland Park are It's a Small World, Star Wars Hyperspace Mountain (formerly known as Space Mountain: Mission 2), Big Thunder Mountain, Pirates of the Caribbean, and Buzz Lightyear's Laser Blast. It's a Small World, located in Fantasyland, takes visitors on a musical tour of world attractions; Star Tours and Hyperspace Mountain (which is a roller coaster) are situated in the Discoveryland district; Big Thunder Mountain is a mine train roller coaster within Frontierland; Pirates of the Caribbean is located in Adventureland; and Buzz Lightyear's Laser Blast, also located in Discoveryland, was inspired by the Disney/Pixar film Toy Story 2 and features people attempting to successfully shoot lasers at seemingly moving targets to earn as many points as possible.

The park is approximately 4,800 acres (1,942 ha), and is divided into two main parks, the fairytale-themed Disneyland Park and Disney's Adventure World, each holds its separate attraction areas within them. While the first park opened in 1992 and included attractions inspired by 'classic Disney characters', the second one opened in 2002 and included 'cinema-themed rides'.

The park receives around fifteen million visitors a year, accordingly, it is considered to be one of the most famous amusement parks in Europe.

In 2018, The Walt Disney Company announced a multi-year expansion project. It had been expected to be completed by 2024 in time for the 2024 Summer Olympics in Paris, but as of June 21st, 2024, it has yet to be completed.

In July 2022, the park opened a new area for its Marvel superheroes which includes a new roller coaster named 'Avengers Assemble: Flight Force' and the 'interactive Spider-Man W.E.B Adventure'. Besides these two attractions, the Marvel Avengers Campus also offers a store, three restaurants, several food trucks and a meeting place for Marvel superheroes.

==== Roller coasters ====
Name	Manufacturer	Speed	Height	Length	Park (Section)	Opened
Big Thunder Mountain Railroad	Vekoma	65 km/h (40 mph)	22 m (72 ft)	1,500 m (4,900 ft)	Disneyland Park, Frontierland	1992
Casey Jr. Circus Train	Vekoma	45 km/h (28 mph)	3 m (9.8 ft)	unknown	Disneyland Park, Fantasyland	1994
Hyperspace Mountain	Vekoma	71 km/h (44 mph)	32 m (105 ft)	1,000 m (3,300 ft)	Disneyland Park, Discoveryland	1995
Indiana Jones and the Temple of Peril	Intamin	58 km/h (36 mph)	18 m (59 ft)	600 m (2,000 ft)	Disneyland Park, Adventureland	1993
Avengers Assemble: Flight Force	Vekoma	92 km/h (57 mph)	24 m (79 ft)	1,037 m (3,402 ft)	Disney Adventure World, Avengers Campus	2002 (as Rock 'n' Roller Coaster avec Aerosmith), 2022
Crush's Coaster	Maurer Söhne	60.7 km/h (37.7 mph)	16 m (52 ft)	545 m (1,788 ft)	Disney Adventure World, Worlds of Pixar	2007
RC Racer	Intamin	80 km/h (50 mph)	25 m (82 ft)	82 m (269 ft)	Disney Adventure World, Worlds of Pixar	2010

==== Rides ====
Name	Manufacturer	Type	Length	Park (Section)	Opened
Buzz Lightyear Laser Blast	Sansei Technologies, Inc.	Dark ride	164 m (538 ft)	Disneyland Park, Discoveryland	2006
It's a Small World	WED Enterprises & Walt Disney Imagineering	Old Mill	unknown	Disneyland Park, Fantasyland	1992
Peter Pan's Flight	Zamperla & Bertala	Dark ride	unknown	Disneyland Park, Fantasyland	1992
Phantom Manor	Vekoma	Dark ride	239 m (784 ft)	Disneyland Park, Frontierland	1992
Pirates of the Caribbean	Intamin	Dark ride	unknown	Disneyland Park, Adventureland	1992
Star Tours: L'Aventure Continue	Thales Training & Simulation	3-D Motion Simulator	unknown	Disneyland Park, Discoveryland	2017
Ratatouille: L'Aventure Totalement Toquée de Rémy	Walt Disney Imagineering	Dark ride	unknown	Disney Adventure World, Worlds of Pixar	2014
Spider-Man W.E.B. Adventure	Walt Disney Imagineering	Shooting dark ride	unknown	Disney Adventure World, Avengers Campus	2022
The Twilight Zone Tower of Terror – A New Dimension of Chills	Walt Disney Imagineering	Drop tower dark ride	unknown	Disney Adventure World, World Premiere Plaza	2007
Frozen Ever After	Walt Disney Imagineering	Boat dark ride	unknown	Disney Adventure World, World of Frozen	2026

=== Hotels ===
The complex features six Disneyland Paris hotels. The Disneyland Hotel is located over the entrance of the Disneyland Park and is marketed as the most prestigious hotel on the property. A body of water known as Lake Disney is surrounded by Disney Hotel New York – The Art of Marvel, Disney Newport Bay Club, and Disney Sequoia Lodge. Disney Hotel Cheyenne and Disney Hotel Santa Fe are located near Lake Disney; Disney Davy Crockett Ranch is located in a woodland area outside the resort perimeter.

Name	Theme	Architect	Number of Rooms	Opening Date	Price	Rating
Disneyland Hotel	Disney Princess; Victorian	Walt Disney Imagineering & Wimberly, Allison, Tong & Goo	496	12 April 1992	€€€	5*
Disney Hotel New York – The Art of Marvel	Marvel Cinematic Universe; Art Deco	Michael Graves	565	21 June 2021	€€€	4*
Disney Newport Bay Club	Mickey Mouse; New England	Robert A.M. Stern Architects	1,098	12 April 1992	€€	4*
Disney Sequoia Lodge	Bambi; National Park Service rustic	Antoine Grumbach	1,011	12 April 1992	€€	3*
Disney Hotel Cheyenne	Toy Story; American frontier	Robert A.M. Stern Architects	1,000	12 April 1992	€	3*
Disney Hotel Santa Fe	Cars; American Southwest	Antoine Predock	1,000	12 April 1992	€	2*

The Disneyland Hotel Paris

Disneyland Paris includes six on-site partner hotels that are not managed by The Walt Disney Company but provide free shuttle buses to the parks: B&B Hotel, Algonquin's Explorers Hotel and Campanile Val de France. There are also two associated hotels located in Val d'Europe: Adagio Marne-la-Vallée Val d'Europe and Hôtel l'Élysée Val d'Europe.

=== Resorts ===
Located set back from the parks, these resorts specialize in adventurous and aquatic activities.

Name	Theme	Design	Number of rooms	Opening date	Price	Rating
Disney Davy Crockett Ranch	Wilderness and adventure	Set back from the parks, the ranch is located in the midst of a large forest. Guests stay in cozy log cabins with access to swimming pools and other sports facilities. There is a restaurant and a bar.	595	12 April 1992	€	2*

=== Transport ===
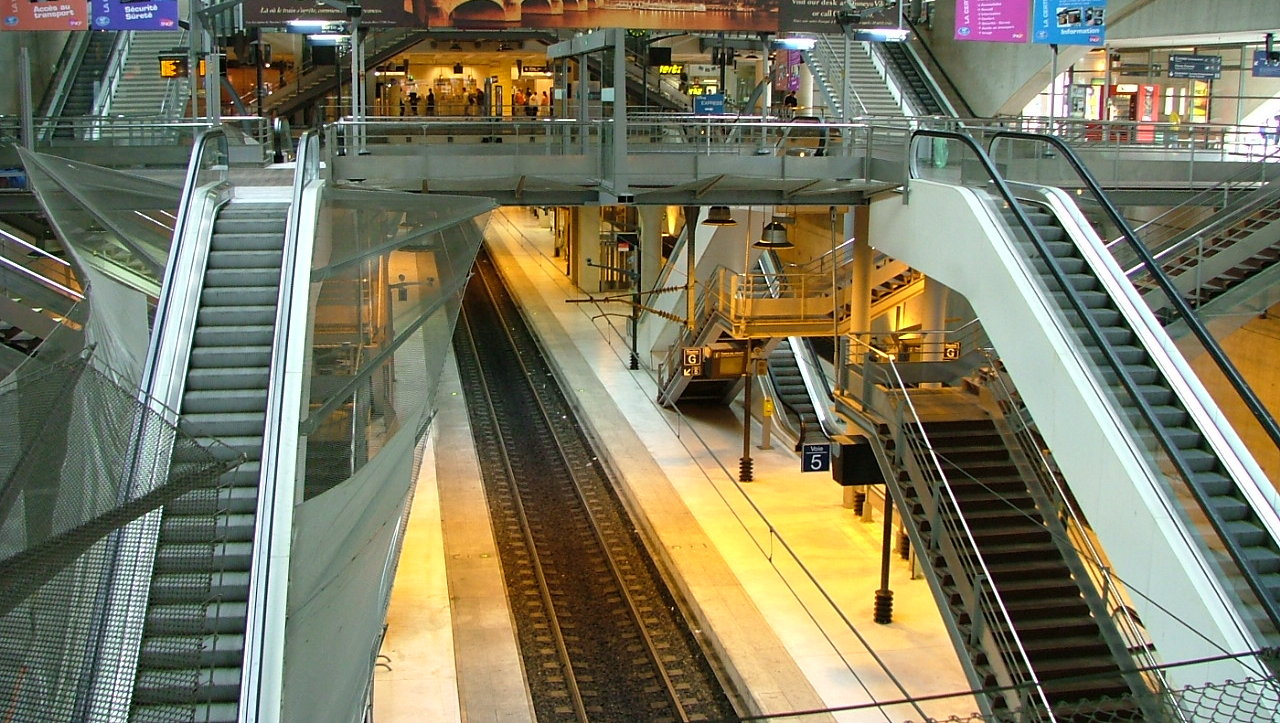
Marne-la-Vallée – Chessy station, view to the platform area

A large railway station, Marne-la-Vallée–Chessy, is located between the theme parks and Disney Village. It opened on 1 April 1992 and is notably served by regional express line RER A which provides a direct connection with the centre of Paris and for further connections, direct to Paris-Gare-de-Lyon.

The railway station is also served by long-distance high-speed TGV and Ouigo trains offering direct services to many cities across France. There are also Eurostar (formerly: Thalys) services to both Brussels and Amsterdam.

Eurostar services were introduced between Disneyland Paris and London St Pancras International in 1996. These were suspended on 7 June 2023, though Eurostar announced they may be reinstated the following year. Customers can still travel from St Pancras to the resort by changing trains at Lille Europe. The suspension follows a re-prioritisation of Eurostar routes following the COVID-19 pandemic, and further complications with post-Brexit border controls. As of 2025, Virgin Trains' plans for cross-channel services in the 2030s included stops at Disneyland Paris.

Free Disney shuttle buses provide transport to all Disney hotels and Les Villages Nature Paris (except Disney Davy Crockett Ranch) and Associated Hotels. They are accessed from the Disneyland bus station.

=== Backstage ===
Disneyland Paris has strict rules designed to prevent guests from seeing backstage areas of the park. Photography and filming are strictly forbidden in all backstage areas. The edges of the parks are lined with ride buildings and foliage to hide areas that are not for the public to see. Numerous area gates allow entrance into the park for cast members, parade floats, etc. When area gates around the park are open, anything that can be seen through them is considered to be on-stage and part of the "Disney Magic". Therefore, from the moment the gates are open, all of the cast must be in character and place to 'perform'. As the complex is so big, shuttle buses take cast members to different parts of the parks via service roads located around the perimeter of the parks.

Many attractions are housed in large, soundstage-like buildings called "show buildings", some of which are partially or completely disguised by external theming. Most show buildings have off-white flat roofs that support HVAC units and footpaths for maintenance cast members. Housed inside the show buildings are the actual attractions, which include hidden walkways, service areas, control rooms, and other backstage operations.

=== Accessibility and Inclusivity ===
Disneyland Paris provides various accommodations for guests with disabilities, including the Priority Access Card, which allows expedited entry to attractions via dedicated entrances for those with disabilities or long-term illnesses. More than 200,000 access cards were issued in 2023.

=== Attendance ===
Annual attendance
Year	Disneyland	Walt Disney Studios	Total
1992	10,000,000	—	10,000,000
1993	9,800,000	—	9,800,000
1994	8,800,000	—	8,800,000
1995	10,700,000	—	10,700,000
1996	11,700,000	—	11,700,000
1997	12,600,000	—	12,600,000
1998	12,500,000	—	12,500,000
1999	12,500,000	—	12,500,000
2000	12,000,000	—	12,000,000
2001	12,200,000	—	12,200,000
2002	10,300,000	2,800,000	13,100,000
2003	10,200,000	2,200,000	12,400,000
2004	10,200,000	2,200,000	12,400,000
2005	10,200,000	2,100,000	12,300,000
2006	10,600,000	2,200,000	12,800,000
2007	12,000,000	2,500,000	14,500,000
2008	12,688,000	2,612,000	15,300,000
2009	12,740,000	2,655,000	15,395,000
2010	10,500,000	4,500,000	15,000,000
2011	10,990,000	4,710,000	15,700,000
2012	11,200,000	4,800,000	16,000,000
2013	10,430,000	4,470,000	14,900,000
2014	9,940,000	4,260,000	14,200,000
2015	10,360,000	4,440,000	14,800,000
2016	8,400,000	4,970,000	13,370,000
2017	9,660,000	5,200,000	14,860,000
2018	9,843,000	5,298,000	15,141,000
2019	9,745,000	5,245,000	14,990,000
2020	2,620,000	1,410,000	4,030,000
2021	3,500,000	1,880,000	5,380,000
2022	9,930,000	5,340,000	15,270,000
2023	10,400,000	5,700,000	16,100,000
2024	10,200,000	5,600,000	15,800,000

=== Top 4 amusement parks in Europe by annual attendance (in millions) ===
Disneyland Paris (Parc Disneyland)
Europa-Park
Efteling
Disney Adventure World (Walt Disney Studios Park)

== Notable incidents ==
Notable incidents that have taken place at Disneyland Paris in France. The term incidents refers to major accidents, injuries, deaths, and significant crimes. While these incidents are required to be reported to regulatory authorities for investigation, attraction-related incidents usually fall into one of the following categories:

- Caused by negligence on the guest's part. This can be refusal to follow specific ride safety instructions, or deliberate intent to break park rules.
- The result of a guest's known, or unknown, health issues.
- Negligence on the park's part, either by the ride operator or maintenance.
- Act of Nature or a generic accident (e.g. slipping and falling) that is not a direct result of an action on anybody's part.

== See also ==
- Large amusement railways
- Rail transport in Walt Disney Parks and Resorts
- The Walt Disney Company
- List of tourist attractions in Paris
