= Celebration in the Air =

Previous event at Hong Kong Disneyland

Celebration in the Air (Chinese: 飛躍奇妙) is a year-long event celebrating Hong Kong Disneyland's 5th Anniversary, which has been held in Hong Kong Disneyland Resort, Penny's Bay, Lantau Island, Hong Kong.

Although the official day of the park's 5th anniversary was 12 September 2010, the event officially begins on 21 January 2011, which was also a day for press events and premieres.

== Theme song ==
The theme song for the event is called "Celebration in the Air", which is composed by Rony Fortich, the music director of Hong Kong Disneyland. The lyrics of Cantonese version is written by Albert Leung. The song's premiere was performed in live by Kelly Chen and Hacken Lee during the launch ceremony on 21 January 2011. Part of the song is composed in the show music of Tinker Bell Castle Illumination. The song's instrumental version is then played after the show as the exit music.

== Event entertainment ==
=== Attractions ===
- Pixie Hollow
- "The Magic Continues" Preview Gallery

=== Entertainment ===
- Flights of Fantasy Parade
- Tinker Bell Castle Illumination

=== Theming projects ===
- Toy Story Land

=== Shops ===
- Center Street Boutique

=== Seasonal events ===
- Year of Rabbit Celebration (21 January – 13 February 2011)
- Star Guest Program (11 March – 22 May 2011)
- Rev Up Your Summer Fun! (10 June – 31 August 2011)
- Disney's Haunted Halloween (22 September – 31 October 2011)
- A Sparkling Christmas – Toy To The World (18 November 2011 – 2 January 2012)
