= Magic Music Days =

Magic Music Days was a program put on by Disney resorts globally, except for Tokyo, Paris, and Shanghai. Its intent bring in school and community groups to perform in the parks and/or take part in workshops or clinics. This program was replaced by Disney Imagination Campus which includes all performing groups and field trip ticket-only youth groups. Sometimes, this program is broadcast live during the Disney Parks Christmas Day Parade on ABC. Types of groups included:

- Instrumental Groups
- Vocal Groups
- Dance Groups

== Performance Requirements ==
Disneyland: Groups wishing to perform would send in a video of the group and pass an audition. Groups that do not pass may not perform in the park but may participate in a workshop.
Walt Disney World: Groups wishing to perform would send in a video audition and picture with their application. All groups would purchase tickets through Disney Magic Music Days. They may perform in the parks or participate in a workshop. Groups that do not pass may not perform in the park but may participate in the workshop.
Hong Kong Disneyland: Groups would send in a video, picture and proposed song list with their application. All groups would purchase tickets through Disney Magic Music Days.

== Performance Areas ==
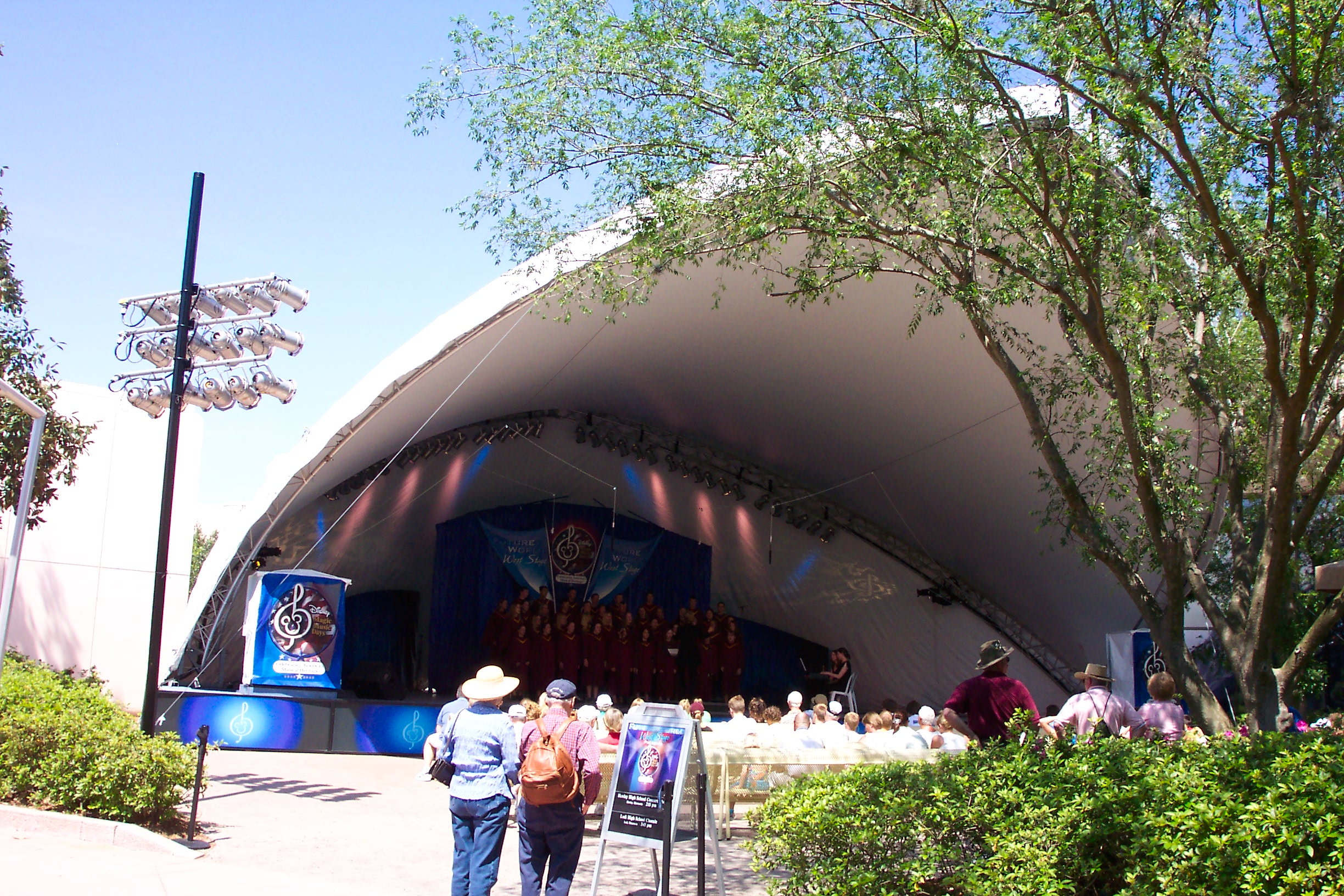
Located on the west side of Epcot, this stage is used primarily by vocal and instrumental groups participating in the Disney's Magic Music Days program.

Disneyland: Dance and Instrumental groups may perform at the Carnation Plaza Gardens stage located to the west of Sleeping Beauty Castle or at the Hollywood Backlot stage in Disney's California Adventure (DCA). On rare occasions the Small World mall area has been used for performances. Bands march down Disneyland's parade route as a pre-parade, a show directly before the parade. Bands might also march down DCA's performance corridor as a pre-parade or as a pre-show to the High School Musical Pep Rally (prior to Sunshine Plaza's closure).

Walt Disney World: Orchestras may play on an outdoor stage at the marketplace, an outdoor shopping center. At Epcot, groups may also perform on a stage that is encased by a temporary "shell", this is located next to Innoventions West. The stage faces a small seating area with a control booth at the rear of the area. Magic Kingdom: Groups performing in the Magic Kingdom may have the opportunity to perform Cosmic Ray's Starlight Cafe in Tomorrowland. Groups may also perform at the Disney Springs stage in front of World of Disney. For those groups that are marching, the bands perform a march down the parade route at various times but may or may not coincide with one of Disney's actual parades. They may also march at Epcot around the World Showcase or Future World.

Hong Kong Disneyland: Vocal and dance groups may perform at the Hong Kong Disneyland Railroad Main Street station inside the park. March bands may march down Main Street, U.S.A. starting from the first-aid station. Orchestras may play on the castle forecourt in front of Sleeping Beauty Castle/Castle of Magical Dreams. During Christmastime, groups may also perform in the front lobby of Hong Kong Disneyland Hotel and Disney's Hollywood Hotel.

== Workshops/Clinics ==
Disneyland: Disneyland workshops are run by current and former Disneyland Cast Members who work professionally outside of Disneyland in the industry of the workshop they are running. Instrumental clinicians often conduct, arrange, direct, or perform music for major television and movie studios. Workshops are 90 minutes long and are designed to give students a taste of what professional studio musicians, singers, or dancers go through. Dance workshops are run like an audition. Instrumental workshops and Choral workshops cover multiple song segments from Disney animated and live action movies and are dubbed onto the film using a click track. Groups participating in a Workshop often receive a DVD of their work.
Walt Disney World: WDW clinics are run by Disney World Cast Members. Some of these clinicians also work professionally in their field outside of Walt Disney World. Instrumental clinics are three hours long, cover one Disney medley piece, played back with Disney animation clips, much like a movie trailer. A Disney character, usually Mickey or Goofy, makes an appearance at the end of the workshop to thank the students for their work. Groups participating in a Workshop receive a DVD of their work.

== Souvenirs ==
Disneyland: Directors receive any signs displayed in Disneyland or Disney's California Adventure which displayed their group's name, a plaque thanking the group for its efforts in arts, and a gift bag courtesy of the Yamaha corporation. Each participant receives a Disneyland specific Magic Music Days shirt.
Walt Disney World: For the groups that perform in the Magic Music Days program, the participants might receive a couple souvenirs from Disney. Past items include a commemorative pin from the Magic Music Days (this pin is exclusively reserved for just the participants) and a shirt with the Magic Music Days logo on the front. The director/organization receive a banner indicating their groups performance for the "World", a plaque that they can display, or a small statue of Mickey Mouse all dressed up as a director.

== Backstage ==
Groups participating in the program are taken through backstage areas of the parks that guests normally cannot see. (Photography and videography are prohibited in these areas.) The group may have their picture taken by Disney and then either perform, take part in a workshop, or experience both.
Disneyland: Participants enter backstage via access roads along the north side of the park, using changing rooms and the four-room rehearsal hall near the backside of Toontown. They can also catch glimpses of various warehouses and the adjacent Circle D Ranch where Disneyland's livestock are kept. During this time, they can purchase drinks or snacks through vending machines.
Epcot: A Magic Music Days building is located behind the Italian pavilion. There, groups may change into their costumes/gowns, warm up, have rehearsals, or anything else the group may need to perform prior to appearing onstage. The groups may enter the park in two locations, one being located next to Italy, and the other between Imagination! and The Land Pavilions.
Magic Kingdom: Students performing in the Magic Kingdom are escorted through a cast-members-only entrance next to Pirates of the Caribbean. From there, they make their way to changing locations to prepare for their performance.

== Famous Performers ==
- The Idlers - yearly since 1988 (Epcot: World Showcase stage/American Adventure pavilion; Magic Kingdom: various venues)

== Sponsorship ==
Ludwig/Musser Percussion and Glaesel String Instruments from Conn-Selmer, Inc. are the Official Instrument providers of Disney Magic Music Days at the Walt Disney World Resort. The town of Kissimmee, FL is also a major sponsor for the entire Magic Music Days program at the Disney World Resort complex. Yamaha is the Official Music provider of the Disneyland Resort and Hong Kong Disneyland Resort.
