= Disneyland Resort Pier =

Pier in Hong Kong

Coordinates: 22°18′25″N 114°02′44″E

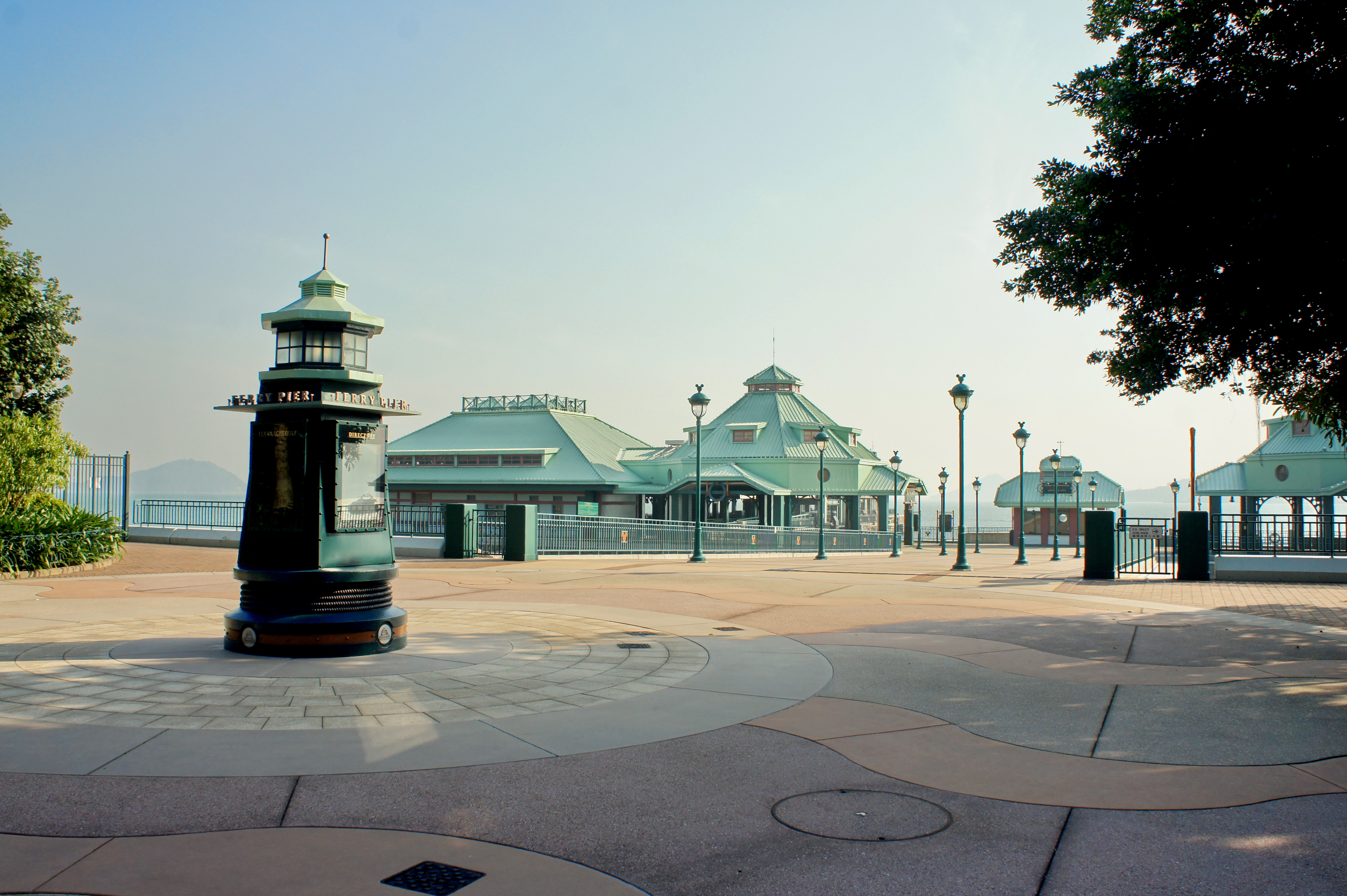
Disneyland Resort Pier

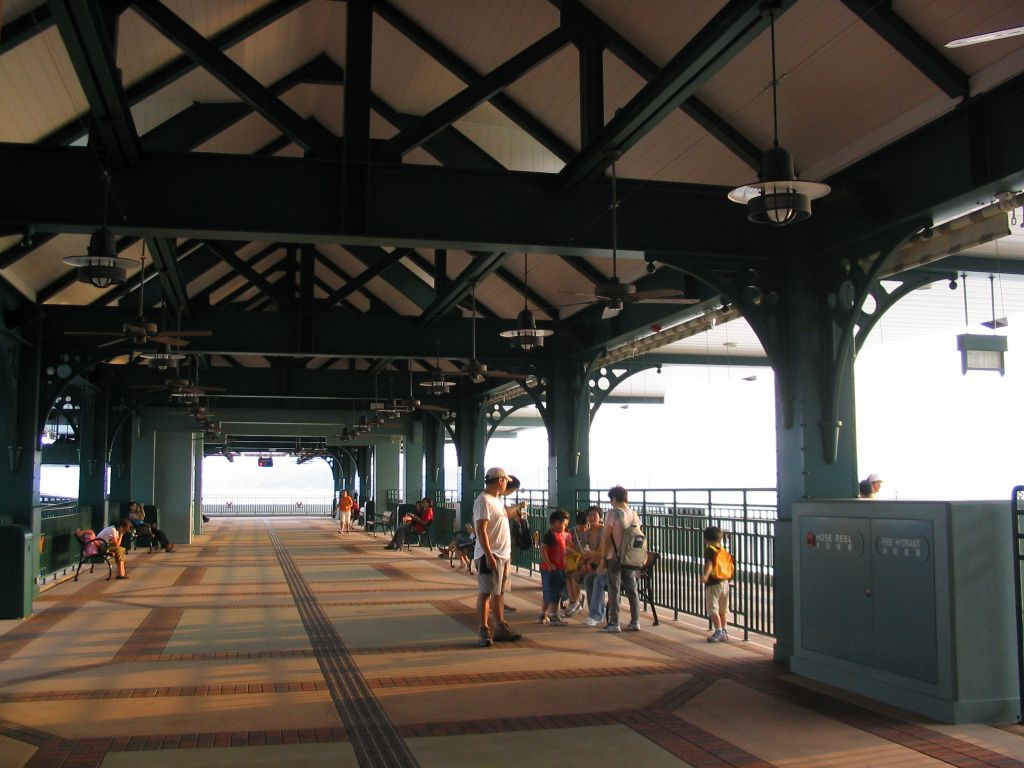
Pier interior

Disneyland Resort Pier (Chinese: 迪士尼碼頭) is located at the south of the Hong Kong Disneyland Resort, Penny's Bay, Lantau Island, Hong Kong, with about 15-minute walking distance from Disneyland Resort station. It is a public pier for use by private vessels, yachts as well as tour vessels 24-hour free-of-charge.

It was planned to provide a ferry service between Central Piers and Disneyland Resort Pier. However, no ferry operators tendered for the service.

On 15 November 2016, Star Ferry announced that it has recently transformed a 27-year-old ferry "World Star" into an environmentally friendly tour boat, it will sail between Tsim Sha Tsui and Disneyland. The company hopes to attract more tourists to explore Hong Kong on the water. The company expects to break even in six years' time. The final day of operations for this service was on February 23rd 2020.

A new ferry service, operated by Sun Ferry, connects Central Ferry Pier No.6 and Disneyland Resort Pier, between April 30 2026 and June 30 2026.

== External websites ==
- Star Ferry Water Tour
