= Penny's Bay Community Isolation Facility =

Quarantine facility in Hong Kong

Penny's Bay Community Isolation Facility, formerly Penny's Bay Quarantine Centre, is a designated quarantine facility in Penny's Bay, Hong Kong. It was used during the COVID-19 pandemic, and has been reopened in preparation for any suspected cases of Ebola from the Ebola epidemic in Central Africa. The facility is run by the Hong Kong Government. Throughout the pandemic, the isolation facility served more than 270,000 people, before eventually being closed on 1 March 2023.

== History ==
Originally, the site was part of the Hong Kong Disneyland Resort, where a second theme park would have been constructed. However, following the outbreak of COVID-19 in Hong Kong, the quarantine centre was built on the site.

Construction began in February 2020 with the centre being built by China State Construction International Holdings, and Phase 1A was completed, on 17 April 2020. On 16 July 2020, the facility opened to house close contacts of those infected with COVID-19.

In September 2021, the facility used 800 units to help house around 4000 domestic helpers.

In February 2022, the facility was renamed "Penny's Bay Community Isolation Facility".

On 1 March 2023, the facility was closed as COVID-19 restrictions were loosened.

On 17 May 2026, the facility was prepared for the possible isolation of suspected imported cases for the Central Africa Ebola epidemic.

== Controversies ==
=== Tainted food ===
In 2021, Danny Catering Service, a caterer for Penny's Bay Community Isolation Facility, was found to have been storing food at unsuitable temperatures after an inspection by the Food and Environmental Hygiene Department. In the same inspection, a tested food sample was found to be contaminated with Bacillus cereus.

=== Poor logistics ===
Penny's Bay Community Isolation Facility was accused of poor logistical planning, leading to reports of low-quality food, lack of medicine to treat COVID-19, and lack of Wi-Fi, instead offering limited data sim cards. It was also reported that at times the facility's help hotline was out of service for long periods of time.

=== Suicide attempts ===
In 2022, it was reported that there were three attempted suicides at the facility within 27 hours of each other.
