= Inspiration Lake =

Artificial lake in Penny's Bay, Lantau Island, Hong Kong

- Chinese: 迪欣湖
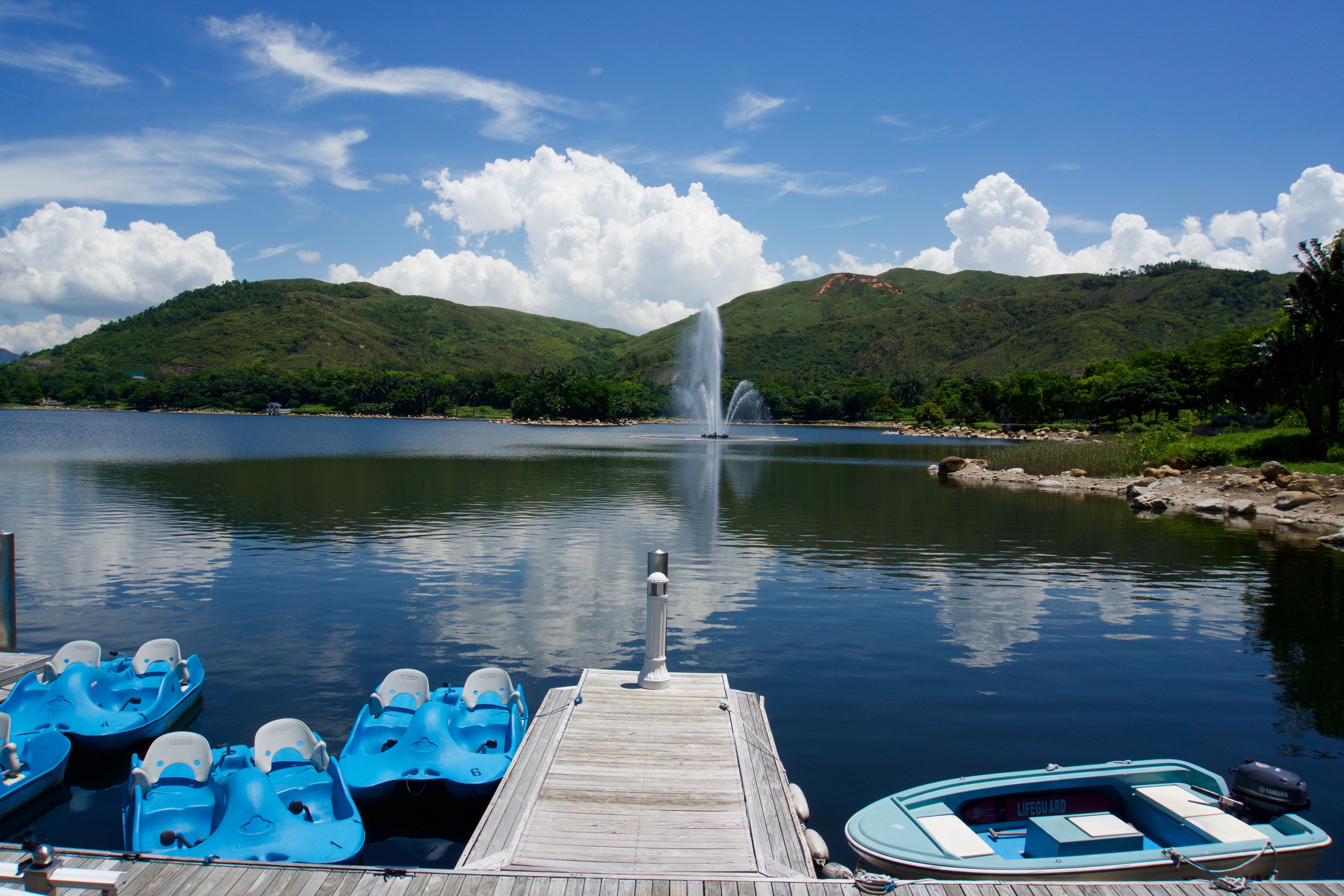
- Lake and fountain

- Location within Hong Kong
- Interactive map of Inspiration Lake
- Location: Penny's Bay, Lantau Island, New Territories, Hong Kong
- Coordinates: 22°19′19″N 114°02′15″E
- Type: Artificial lake
- Basin countries: China
- Managing agency: Hong Kong International Theme Parks
- Construction engineer: Government of Hong Kong
- Surface area: 12 ha (30 acres)
- Max. depth: 6.5 and 7.5 m (21 and 25 ft)

Inspiration Lake (Chinese: 迪欣湖), officially known as Inspiration Lake Recreation Centre (Chinese: 迪欣湖活動中心), is a 12 ha (30 acres) artificial lake located in Penny's Bay, Lantau Island, New Territories, Hong Kong. The lake, opened on 16 August 2005, was created as part of the development of adjacent Hong Kong Disneyland Resort as a dual-purpose project for recreation and an irrigation reservoir.

Inspiration Lake was built by the Hong Kong Government and managed by the Hong Kong International Theme Parks. It opens daily from 09:00 - 19:00; entrance is free.

== Facilities ==
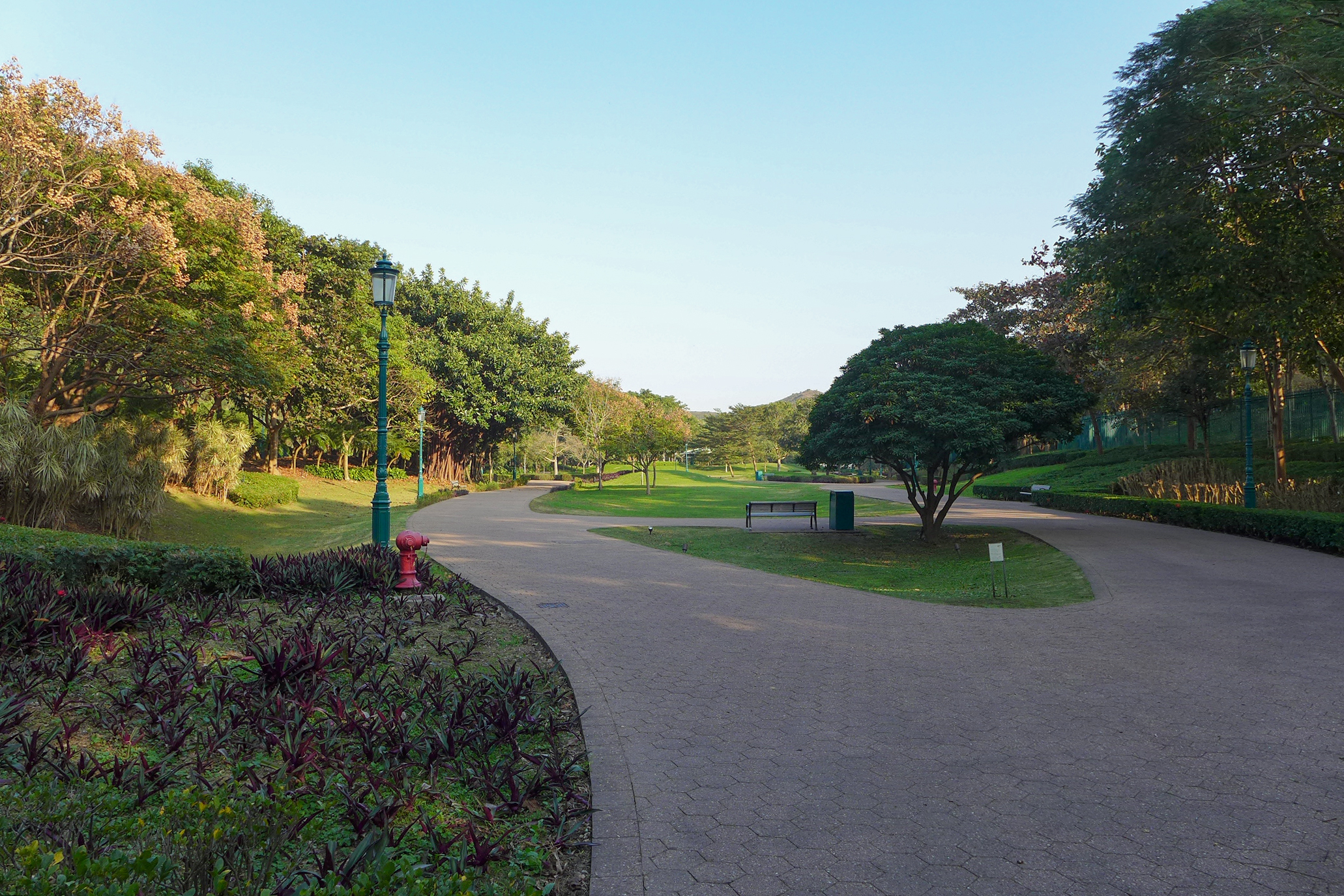
Arboretum

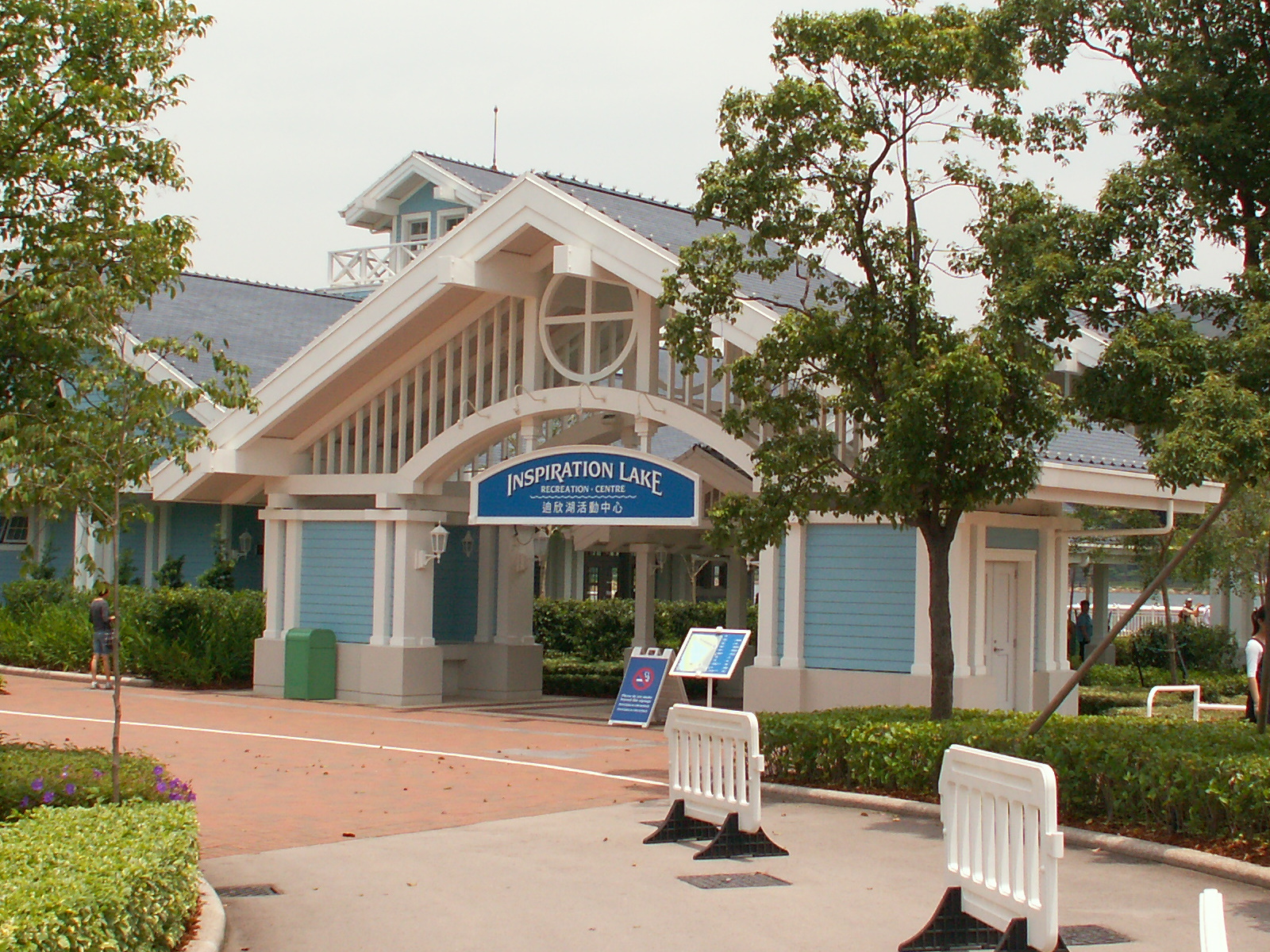
Main entrance of Inspiration Lake.

The entire Recreation Centre has a total area of about 30 ha (74 acres), and consists of the 12 ha (30 acres) — the largest artificial lake in Hong Kong, a boat centre, arboretum, 1,500 m (4,900 ft) jogging trail with exercise areas and a children's playground. The lake has a depth of between 6.5 and 7.5 m (21 and 25 ft), and features aquatic plants, waterfall cascades and water fountains/jets capable of shooting up to 18 m (59 ft) in height; and decorated with natural and man-made boulders plus some 4,800 trees and 430,000 shrubs. Facilities on site include changing rooms, toilets, seating areas, and a convenience store which also serves as a paddle boat and surrey bike renting center. There is also a children's play area near the boat and bike renting center. Apart from its recreational purpose, the lake water is a source of irrigation for the entire Penny's Bay.

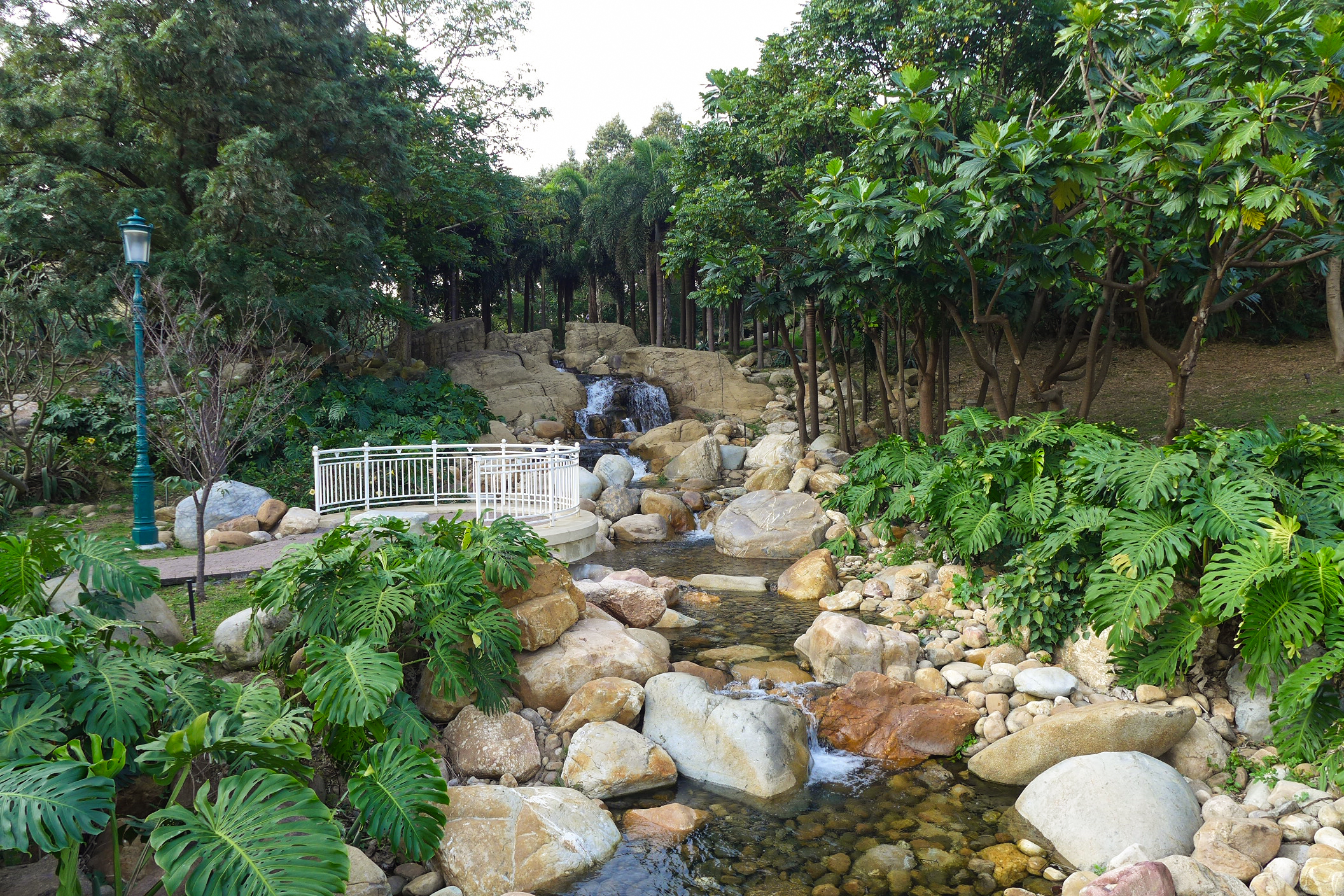
Arboretum waterfall

Along a 1,500 m (4,900 ft) jogging trail emanating from the boat renting center and extending around the lake, there are fitness stations, gazebos and a bridge overlooking a small, picturesque waterfall. The only Eucalyptus deglupta tree in Hong Kong is planted in this centre.

== Transport ==
The lake is approximately 15 minutes walking distance from Disneyland Resort MTR station and the Disneyland Resort Public Transport Interchange. It is served by the following franchised bus route, jointly operated by Citybus and Long Win Bus Company:

- R8 Disneyland - Lantau Link Toll Plaza (via Inspiration Lake) (from 09:00 to 19:00 daily)

Parking is available at HK$50 per hour for private cars. (as of Apr 2022)
