= Disney's Hollywood Hotel =

Hollywood-themed hotel of Hong Kong Disneyland Resort

Coordinates: 22°18′33″N 114°02′13″E

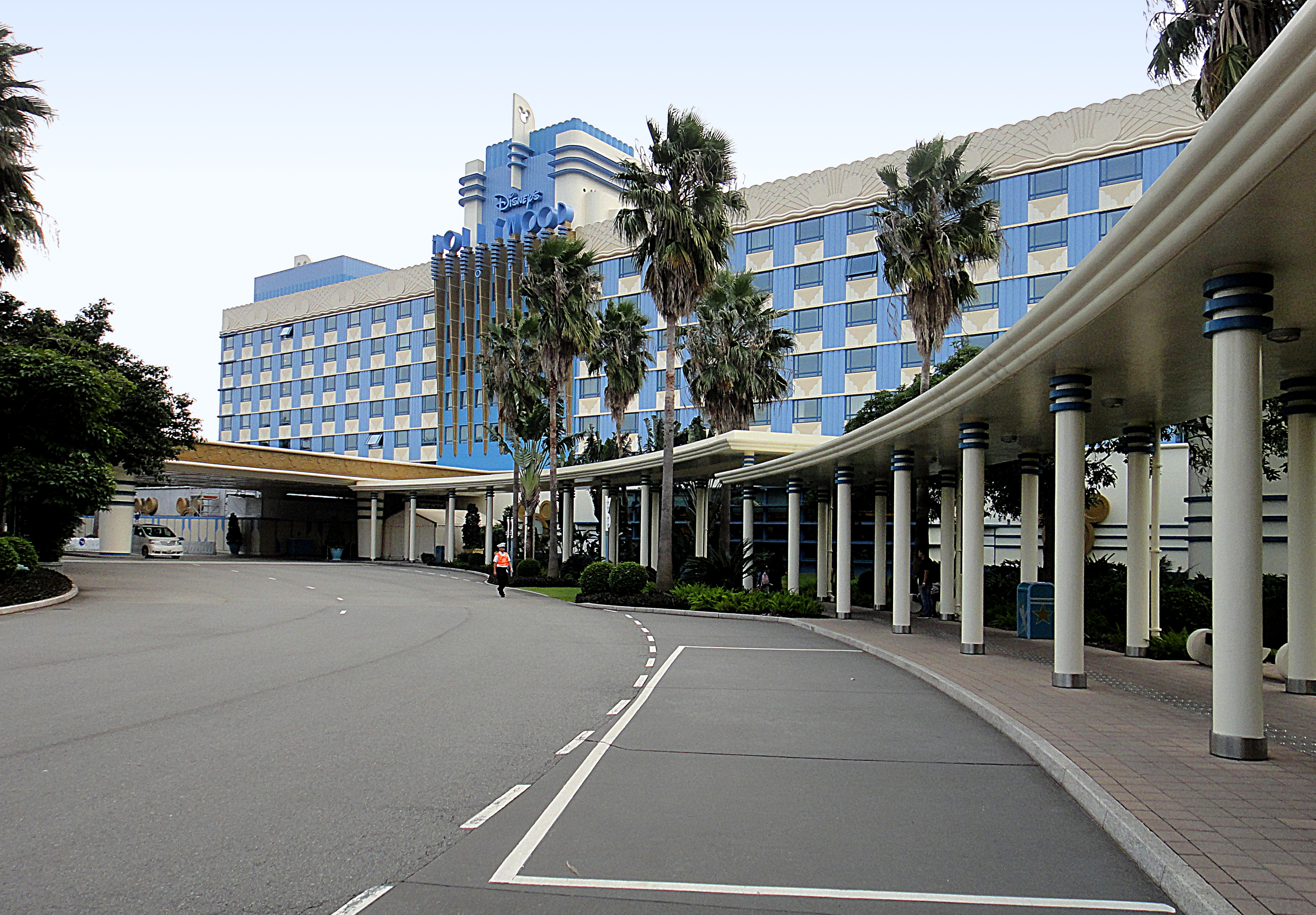
- Interactive map of the Disney's Hollywood Hotel area

General information
- Type: Resort
- Location: Hong Kong Disneyland Resort
- Opened: 12 September 2005; 20 years ago
- Operator: Hong Kong International Theme Parks

Other information
- Number of rooms: 600

Website
- Official website

Disney's Hollywood Hotel
- Traditional Chinese: 迪士尼好萊塢酒店
- Simplified Chinese: 迪士尼好莱坞酒店
Transcriptions

Disney's Hollywood Hotel is one of three hotels at Hong Kong Disneyland Resort in Penny's Bay, Lantau Island, Hong Kong. It officially opened with the resort on Monday, 12 September, 2005. It has a Hollywood Art Deco theme and contains over 600 guest rooms. The rooms contain three options: standard rooms, deluxe rooms, and sea-view rooms. All room types have two themes that could be chosen from, including Mickey and Friends, and Marvel. Rooms also have the option of being wheelchair accessible.

It is in the Islands District.

== Theme ==
The garden of the hotel is decorated with a Hollywood theme. Decorations include classic cars from the 1930s, a pavement decorated as a strip of film, names of roads and highways, and a sign similar to the Hollywood Sign in California. The hotel itself has an Art Deco style, and is themed to the 1930 golden age of movies. The hotel is vaguely U-shaped, with Hidden Mickeys that are hidden throughout the site for guests to find.

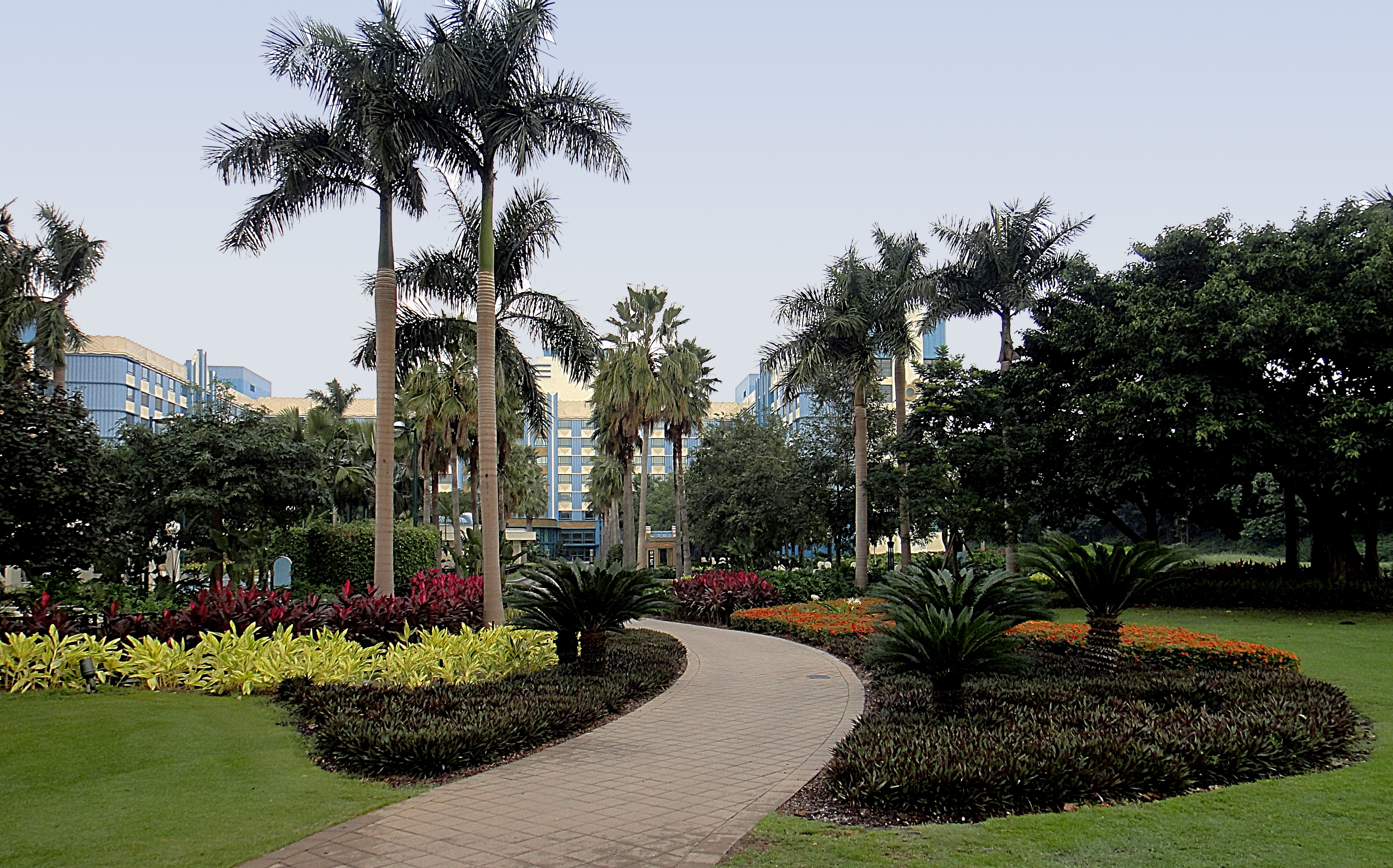
Outdoor garden

== Facilities ==
The hotel features a complementary children's arcade called Malibu Games, featuring air hockey and other activities, and an outdoor children's playground. There is also a Piano Pool, which includes a waterslide.

Hollywood & Dine, a previous restaurant, is the location for most of the hotel's indoor activities, such as arts and crafts and movie knights.

Celebrity Gifts, the gift shop within the hotel, sells plush, toys, pins, and other Hong Kong Disneyland exclusive merchandise.

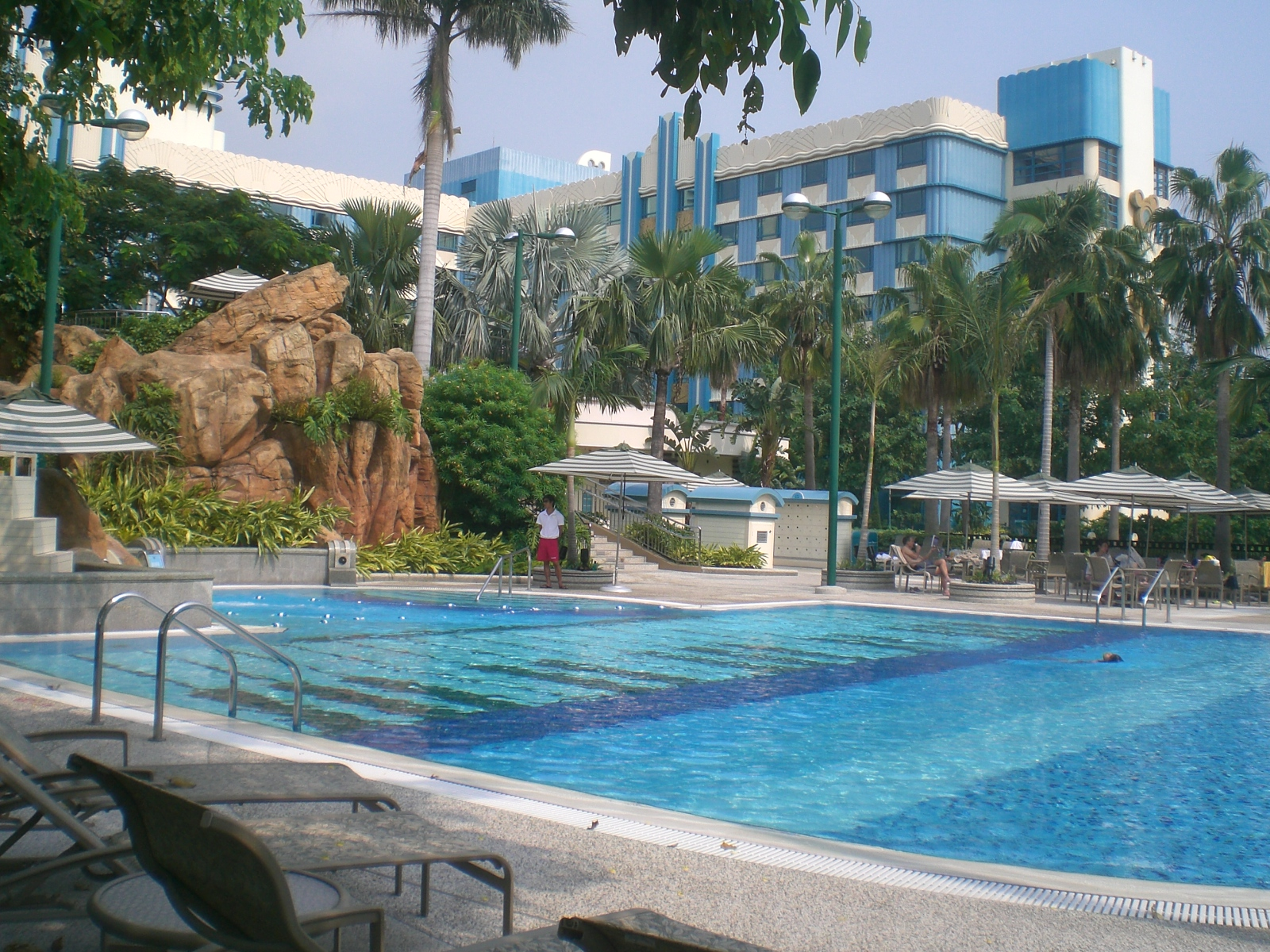
Piano Pool

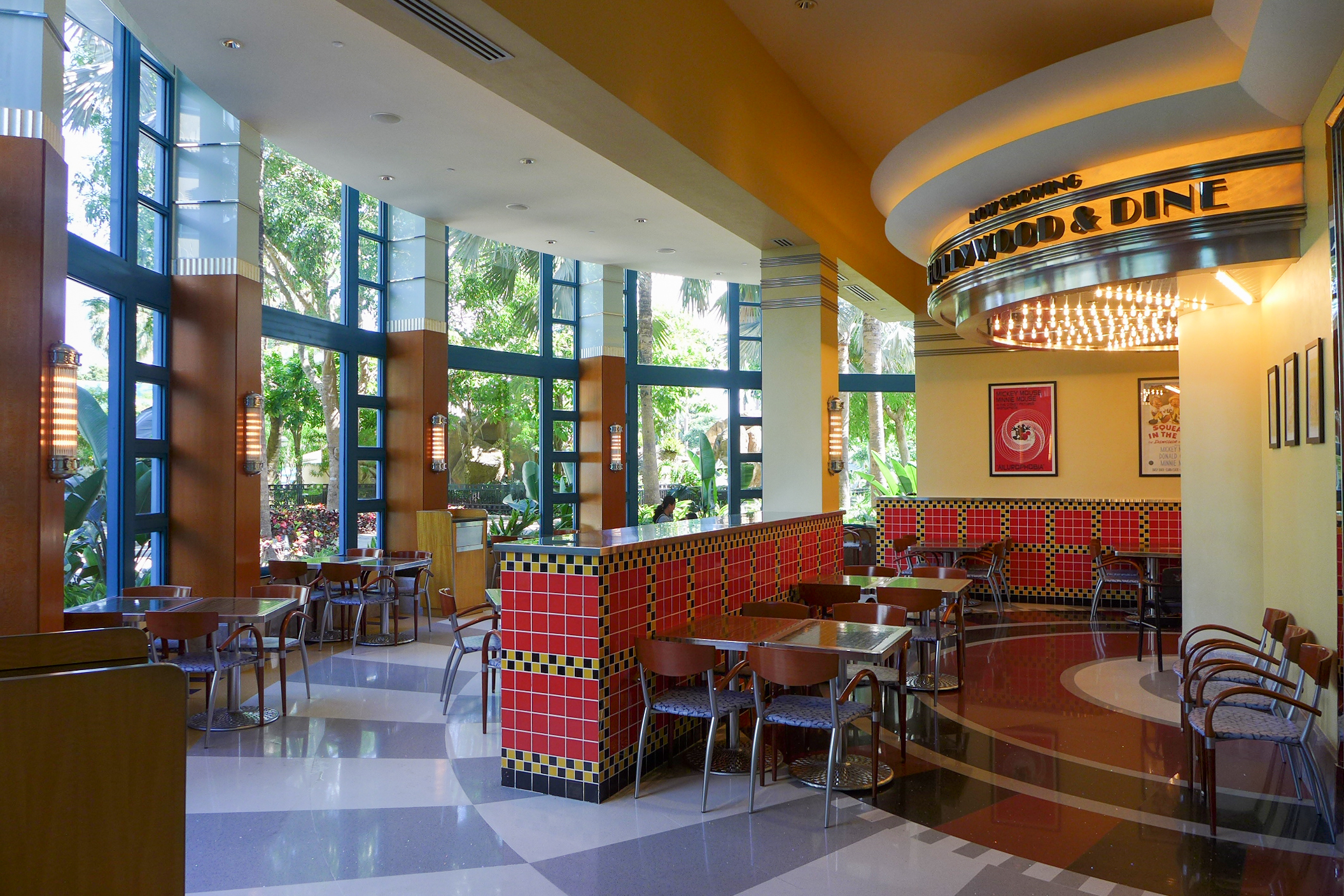
Hollywood & Dine

== Restaurants ==
There are two restaurants in the hotel. Ink and Plate, a buffet style restaurant, and The Archivist, a full-service bar with specialty drinks, snacks, and food.

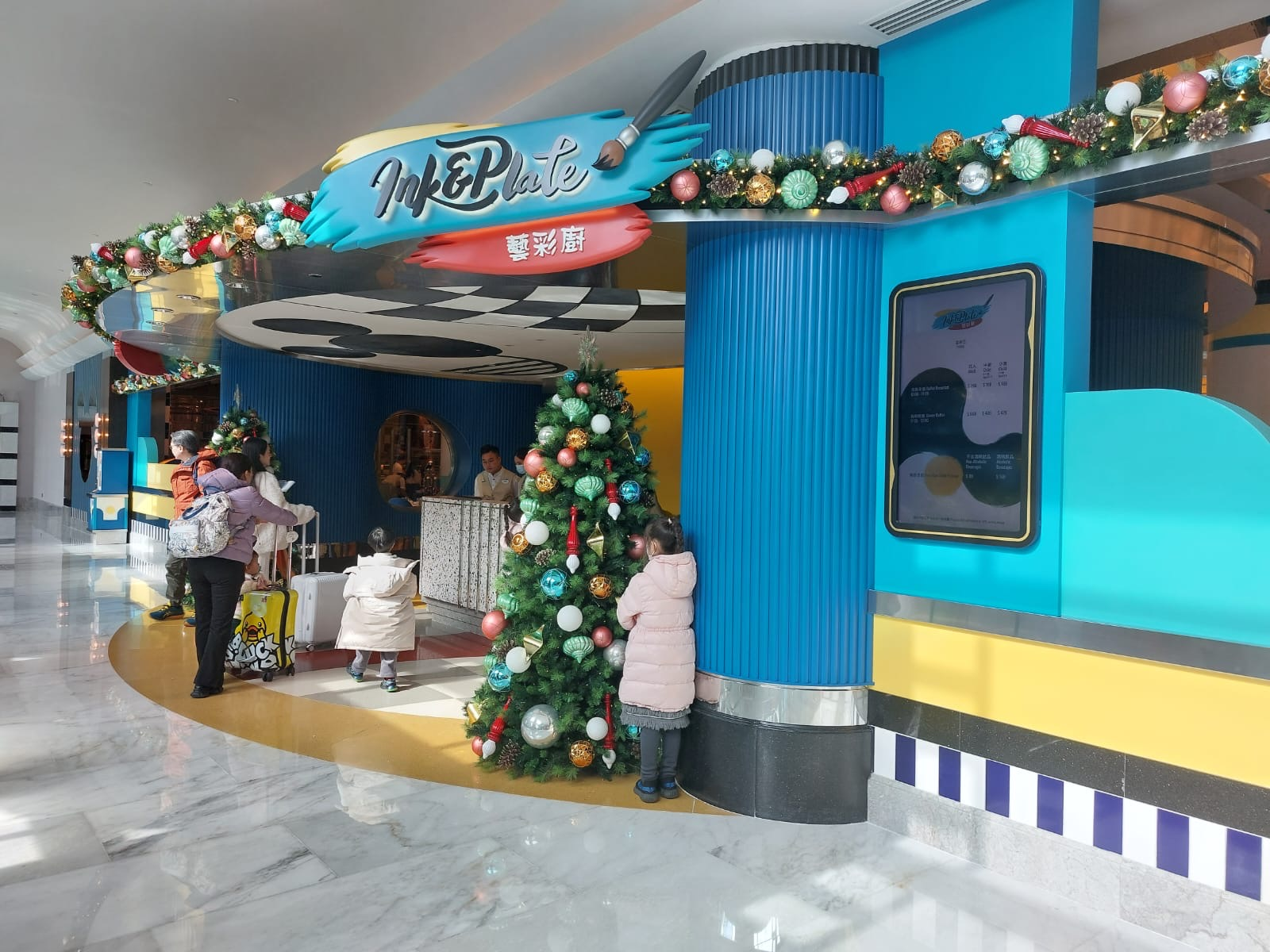
Ink & Plate

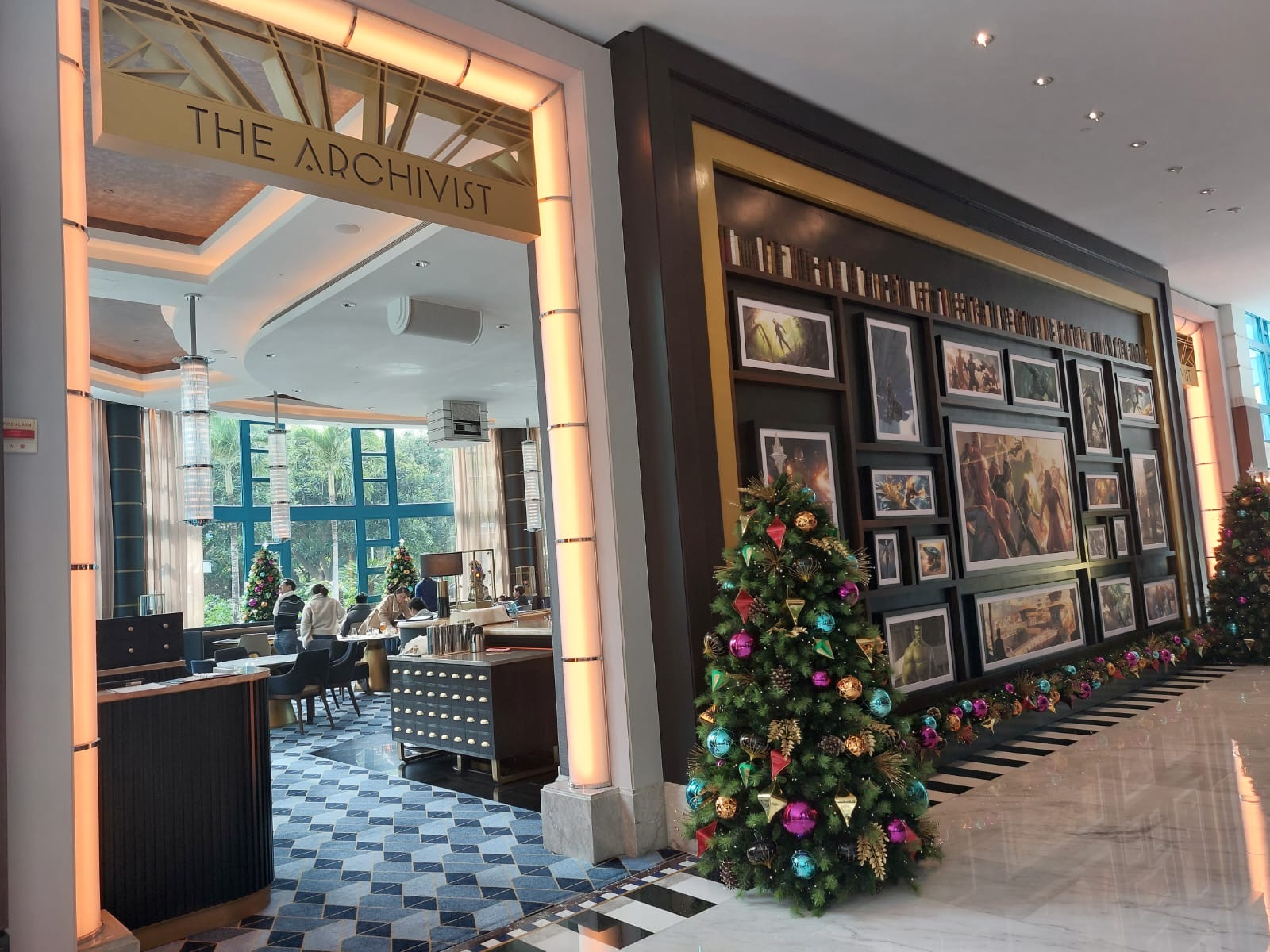
The Archivist

== See also ==
- Hong Kong Disneyland
- Hong Kong Disneyland Hotel
- Disney's Hotel New York, Disneyland Resort Paris, Paris
- Disney's Ambassador Hotel, Tokyo Disney Resort, Chiba
