= Hong Kong Disneyland Hotel =

Second Disney Hotel of Hong Kong Disneyland Resort

Coordinates: 22°18′28.65″N 114°02′38.19″E

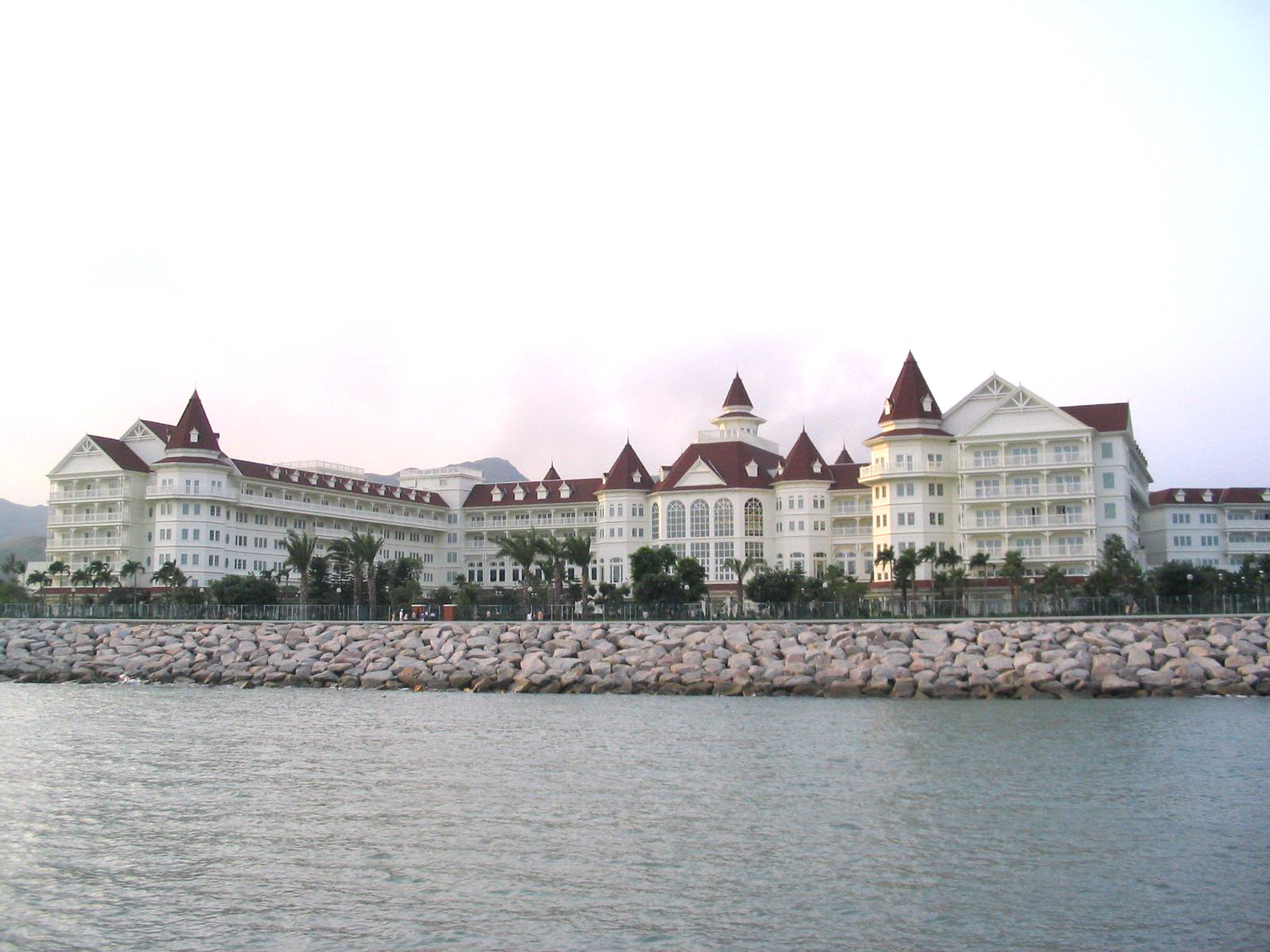
- Interactive map of the Hong Kong Disneyland Hotel area

General information
- Type: Resort
- Location: Hong Kong Disneyland Resort
- Opened: 12 September 2005; 20 years ago
- Operator: Hong Kong International Theme Parks (Disney Parks, Experiences and Products)

Other information
- Number of rooms: 400

Website
- Hong Kong Disneyland Hotel Website

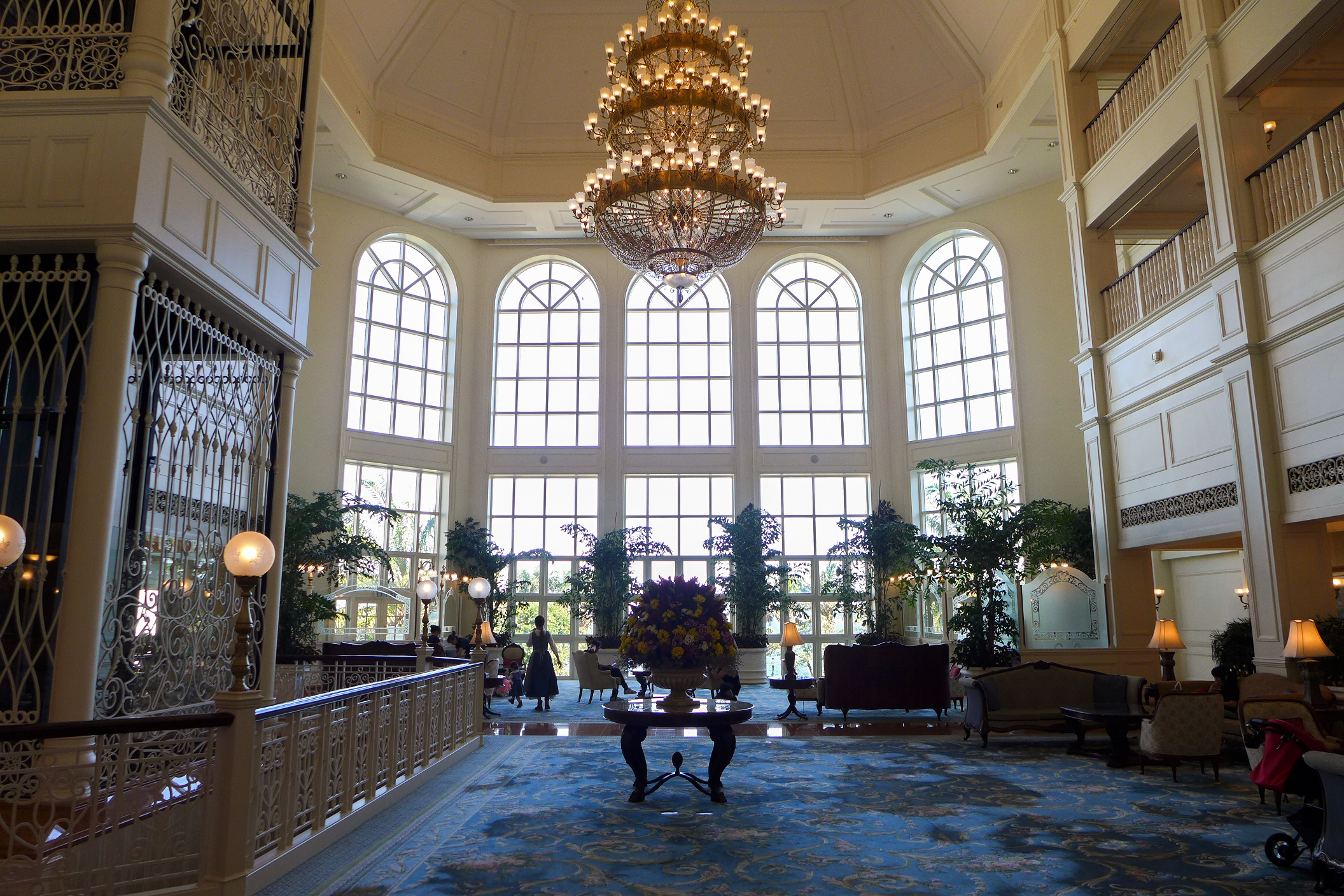
Hotel Lobby

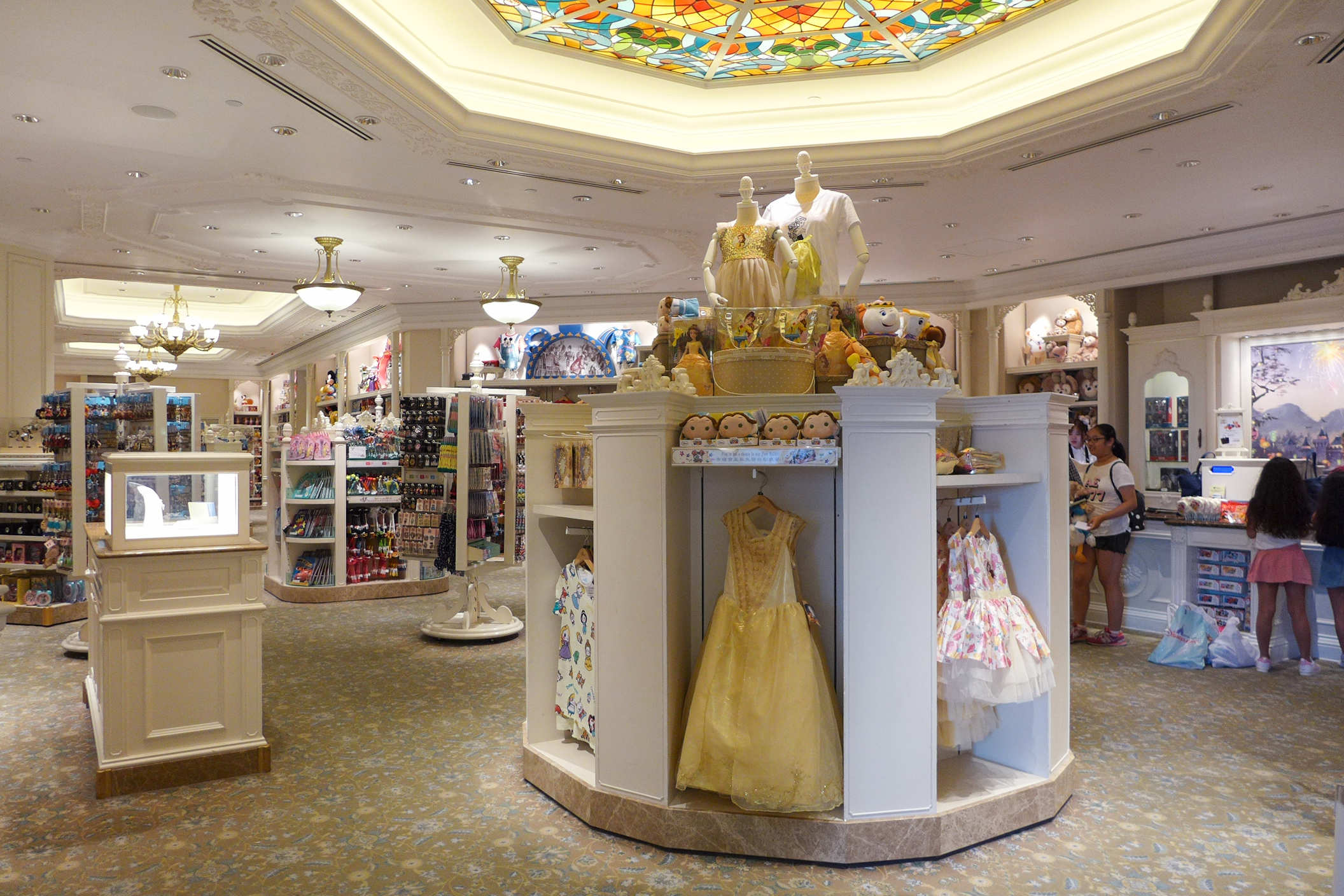
Kingdom Gifts

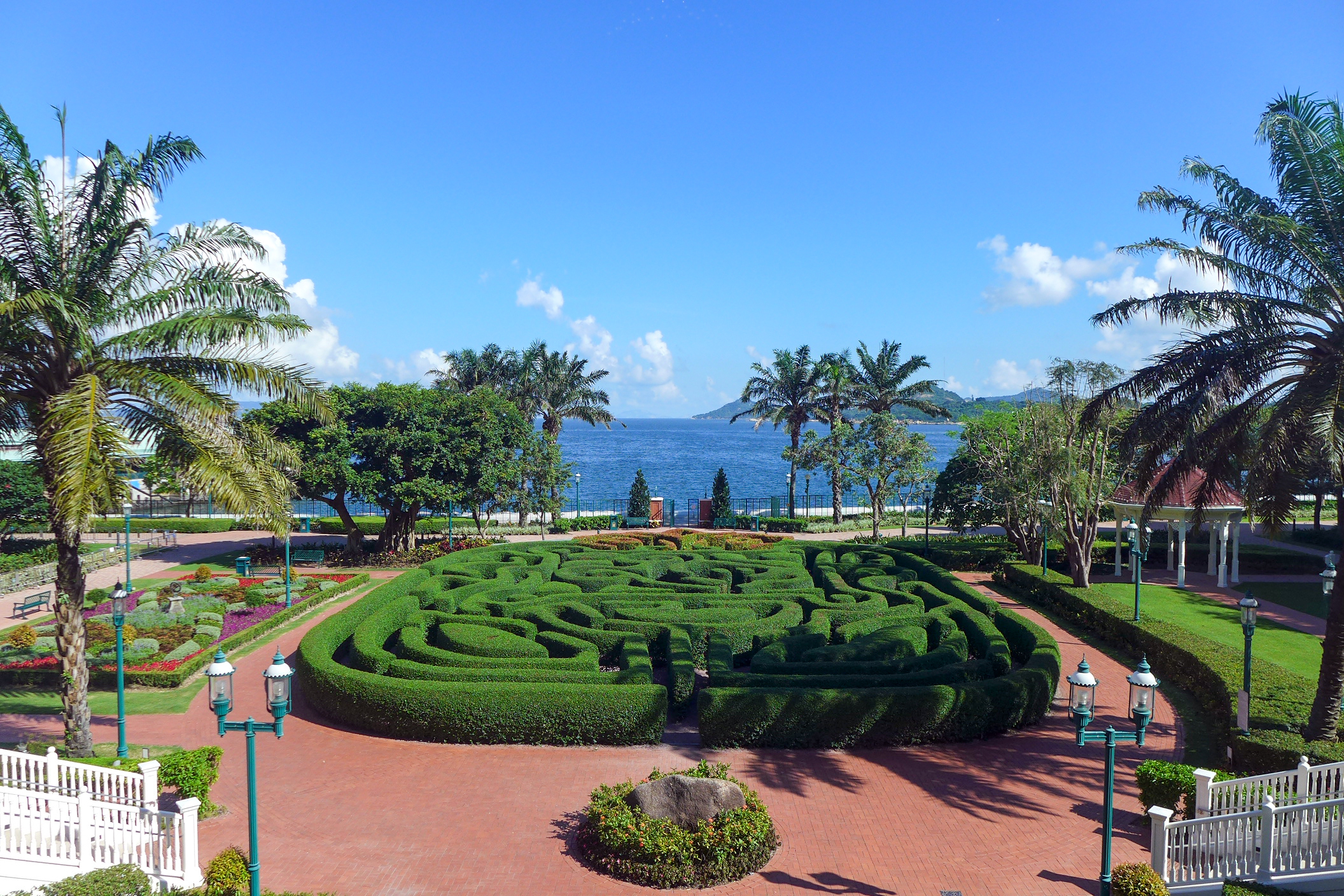
Mickey Maze

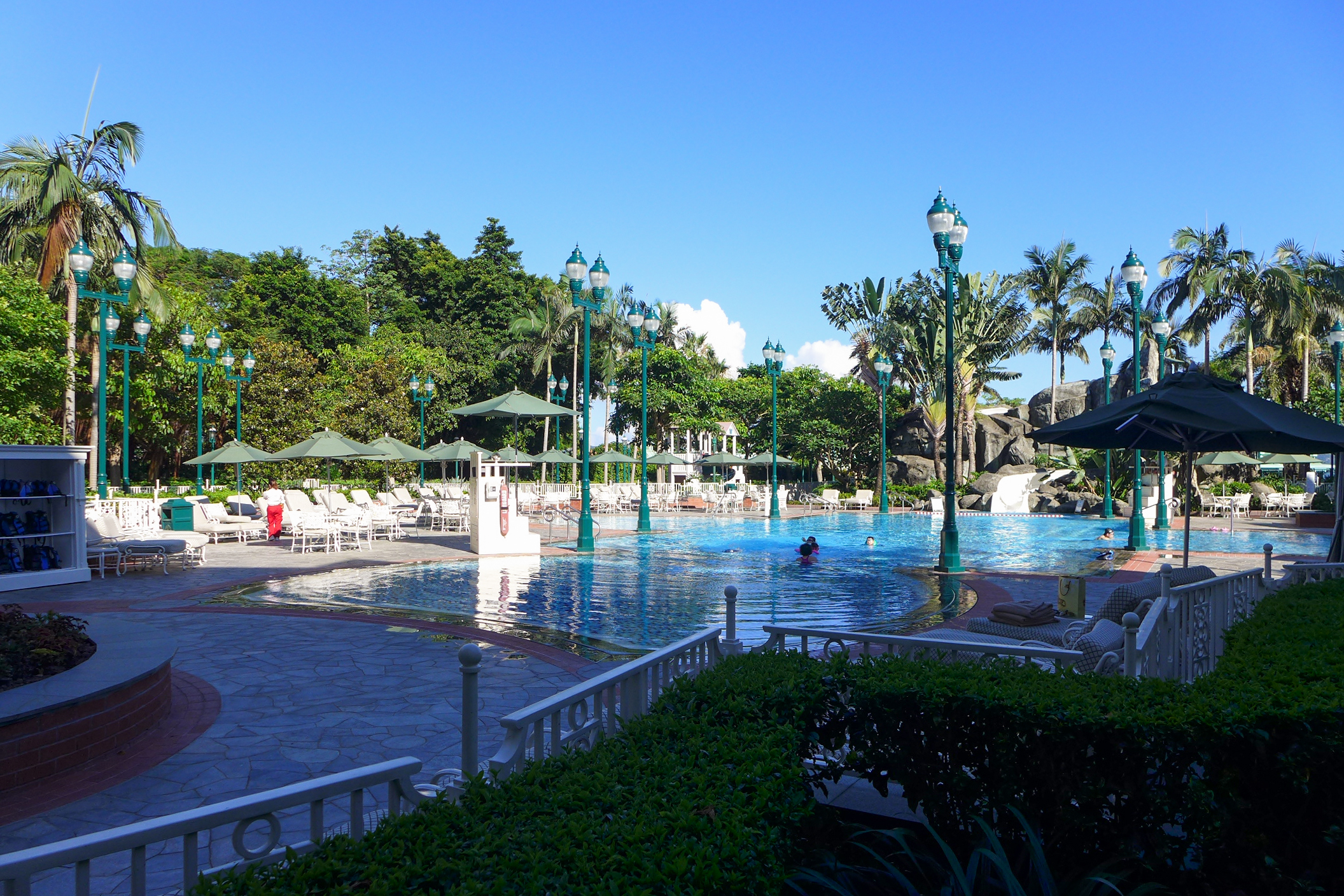
Outdoor Pool

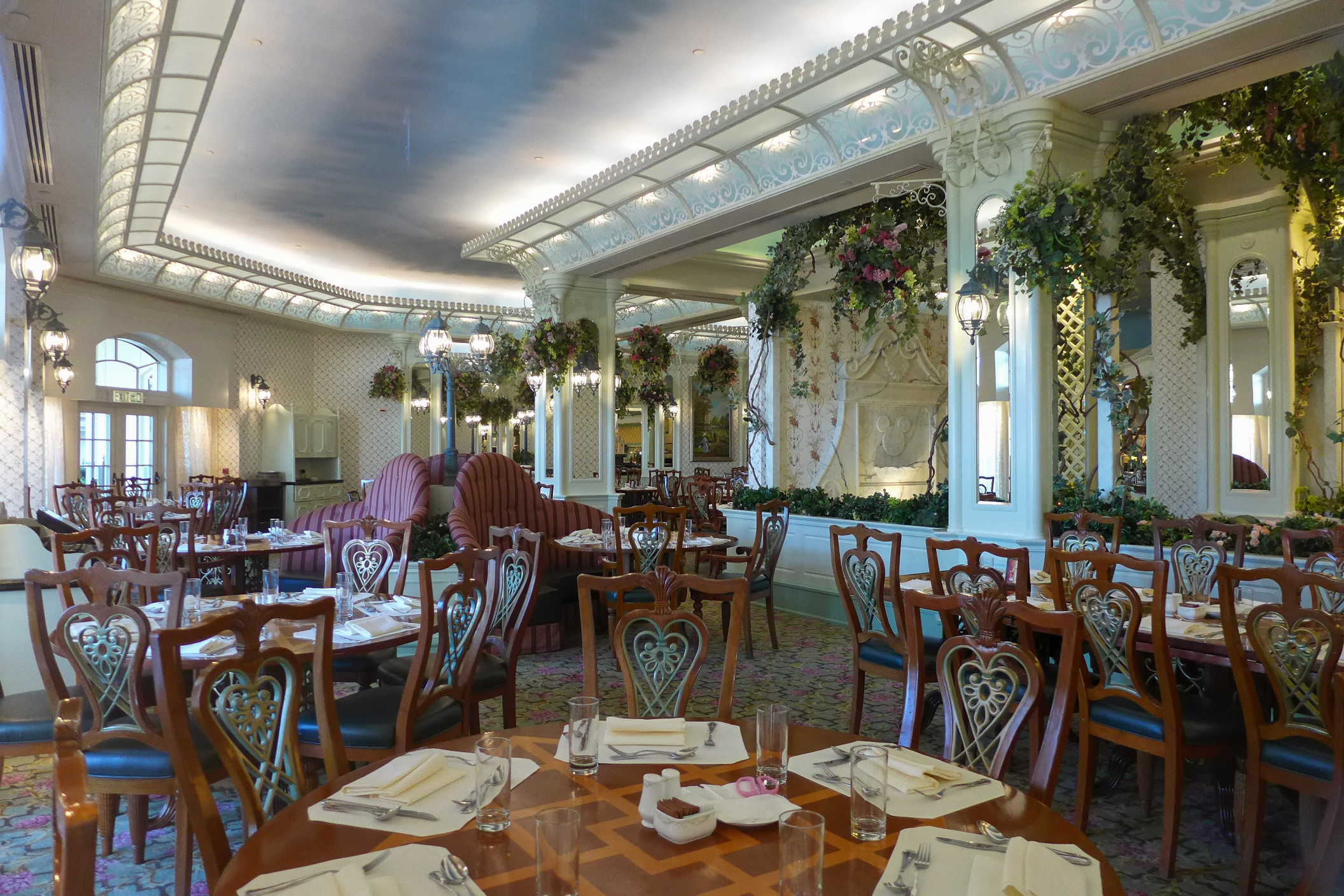
Enchanted Garden Restaurant

Hong Kong Disneyland Hotel is the second Disney hotel in the Hong Kong Disneyland Resort in Penny's Bay, Lantau Island, Hong Kong. The theme of the hotel is of a Victorian style, and is located near Disneyland Harbour. The hotel is built on reclaimed land and opened on 12 September 2005.

The hotel has 400 guestrooms and a convention centre with ballrooms and function rooms.

The Convention Centre offers three ballrooms.

It is in the Islands District.

== Culture ==
"Micktorian" architecture style, a blend of "Mickey" with "Victorian", was adopted by the hotel. For example, "hidden Mickey" is behind the Mickey-eared silhouette, such as carpet design and dinnerware. This specific design is interpreted as feng shui in Cantonese culture.

Walt Disney Imagineering mainly drew these two design elements from Disney's Grand Floridian Resort and Spa at the Walt Disney World Resort, as well as the Disneyland Hotel at Disneyland Paris. Students from invited institutions can apply for either of the following section in ImagiNations Hong Kong Semiar 2017, Community Built Playground, or Family Storytelling, the Neighborhood Developmental Project. Result will be announced in January 2018.

== Dining ==
There are five restaurants in the hotel.

== Shopping ==
The hotel has one shop located on the lobby next to the main entrance. The shop sells drinks, park merchandise, toys and T-shirts. It is slightly Victorian themed, like the hotel itself.

== Facilities ==
There are 2 pools in the resort, 1 indoors and 1 outdoors. The hotel also offers other facilities including a tennis court, a multi-function court, a Mickey-shaped maze and a grass field in which some kids activities take place in. The hotel also has a Victorian Spa which contains a gym. Every day and evening a talented jazz band plays in the main area of the hotel.

== See also ==
- Disney's Hollywood Hotel
- Disney Explorers Lodge
- Hong Kong Disneyland Resort
- Hong Kong Disneyland
- Sunny Bay station
- Disneyland Resort line
- Airport Express (MTR)
- Hong Kong International Airport
- Hong Kong International Theme Parks
- Hong Kong government
- The Walt Disney Company
- Walt Disney Parks and Resorts
- Walt Disney Imagineering
