= Hong Kong Disneyland Resort =

Resort in Hong Kong

Coordinates: 22°18′48″N 114°02′36″E

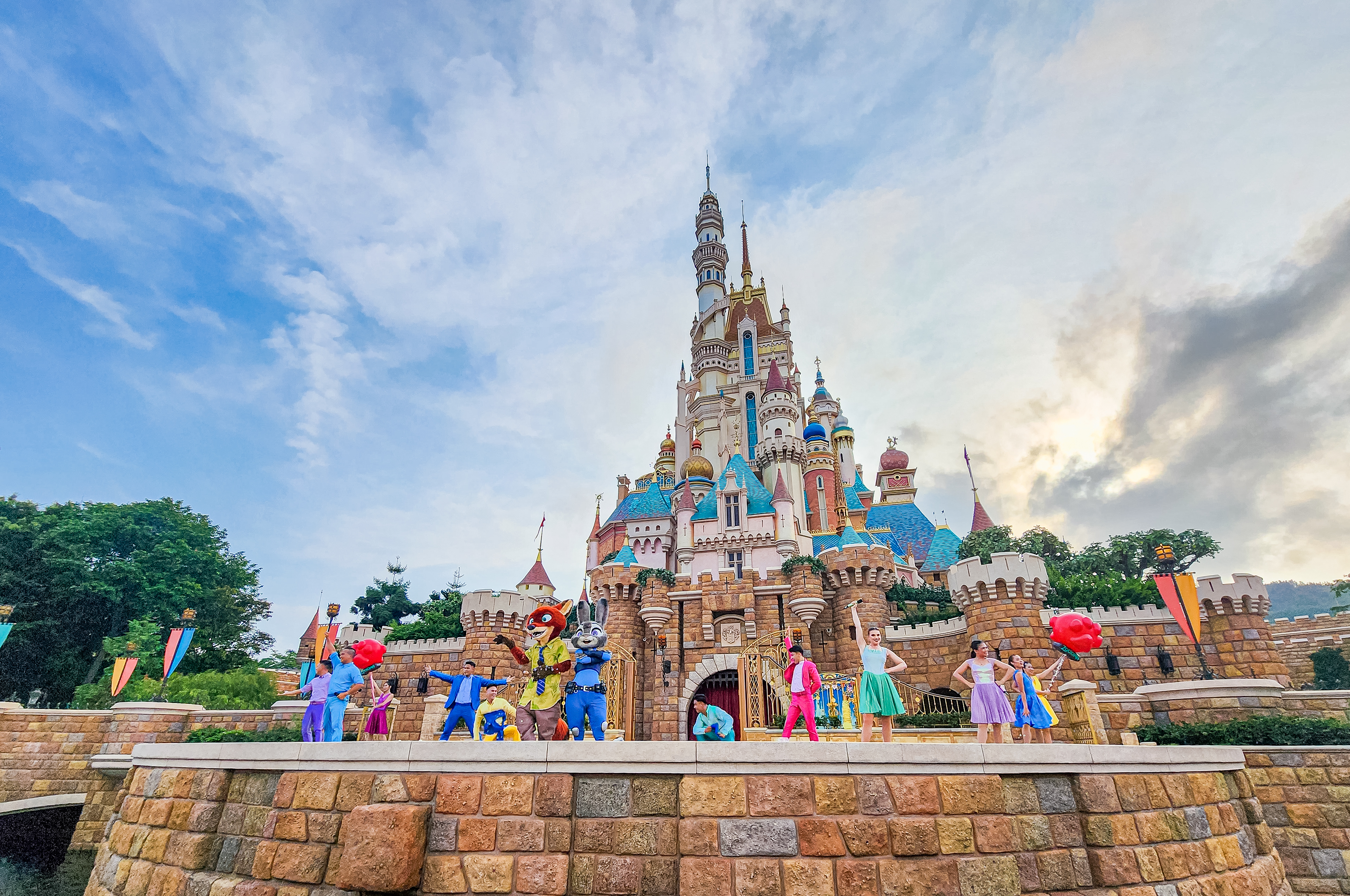
- Castle of Magical Dreams, icon of Hong Kong Disneyland
- Native name: Chinese: 香港迪士尼樂園度假區
- Industry: Amusement parks and resorts
- Founded: 12 September 2005; 21 years ago
- Headquarters: Penny's Bay, Lantau Island, Hong Kong
- Key people: Tim Sypko (managing director)
- Owner: Hong Kong International Theme Parks (Disney Experiences)
- Website: Official website

Hong Kong Disneyland Resort
- Traditional Chinese: 香港迪士尼樂園度假區
- Simplified Chinese: 香港迪士尼乐园度假区
Transcriptions
Standard Mandarin
- Hanyu Pinyin: Xiānggǎng Díshìní Lèyuán Dùjiàqū
Yue: Cantonese
- Jyutping: Hoeng1 gong2 Dik6 si6 nei4 Lok6 jyun4 Dou6 gaa3 keoi1

The Hong Kong Disneyland Resort is a resort built and owned by Hong Kong International Theme Parks Limited, a joint venture of the Government of Hong Kong and The Walt Disney Company in Hong Kong on reclaimed land beside Penny's Bay, at the northeastern tip of Lantau Island, approximately two kilometres (1.2 mi) from Discovery Bay. It is the second Disney Resort in Asia, and the city's third theme park after Lai Chi Kok Amusement Park (now closed) and Ocean Park Hong Kong. Officially opened on 12 September 2005, the resort contains the Hong Kong Disneyland theme park, the Hong Kong Disneyland Hotel, Disney's Hollywood Hotel, Disney Explorers Lodge and several retail, dining and entertainment facilities covering 1.3 square kilometres (320 acres) of the island.

The Hong Kong Disneyland Resort is the second Disney park extension into Asia after the opening of the Tokyo Disney Resort more than 20 years earlier. Currently, the Resort is overseen by Managing Director Tim Sypko who reports to Tasia Filippatos, President and Managing Director, Disney Parks International.

== History and development ==
=== Concept and Background ===
In 1998, a Hong Kong theme park was proposed by Walt Disney Parks and Resorts. The designs made it the smallest of the Disney parks. The Legislative Council of Hong Kong gave approval in 1999 for funding the construction at a former shipyard.

A joint-venture company, Hong Kong International Theme Parks Limited (HKITP), was created in 1999 with Disney investing US$316 million for a 43% equity stake in the project. The Phase One build-out included a projected 10 million annual visitor Disneyland-style theme park, 2,100 hotel rooms, and an area for retail, dining and entertainment. The project was estimated to create 18,000 jobs at opening (both Disney and other employment) and up to 36,000 jobs over the following 20 years. The Hong Kong Government estimated that the first phase of the project will generate a present economic value of HK$148 billion (US$19 billion), or about 6% of gross domestic product (GDP) in benefits to Hong Kong over 40 years of operation.

In 2000, Disney announced a second Chinese theme park resort in mainland China. Tourism workers associations and lawmakers want Disney to drop the mainland project to protect this and general tourism in Hong Kong. Disney promised not to open such a park for eight years. Government Secretary for Economic Service Stephan Ip Shu-kwan and Walt Disney Attractions Chairman Judson Green signed the master project agreement in November 2000.

The government began dredging for the park resort in July 2000. Fish around Ma Wan died as a result of land reclamation.

=== Construction ===
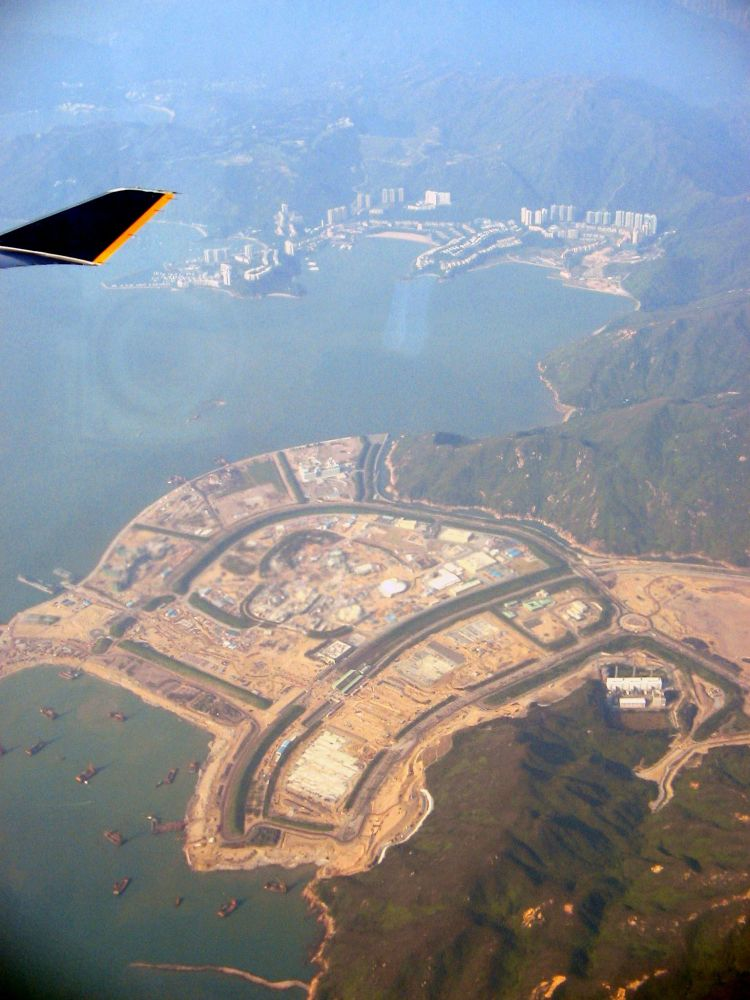
Hong Kong Disneyland Resort under construction (October 2004)

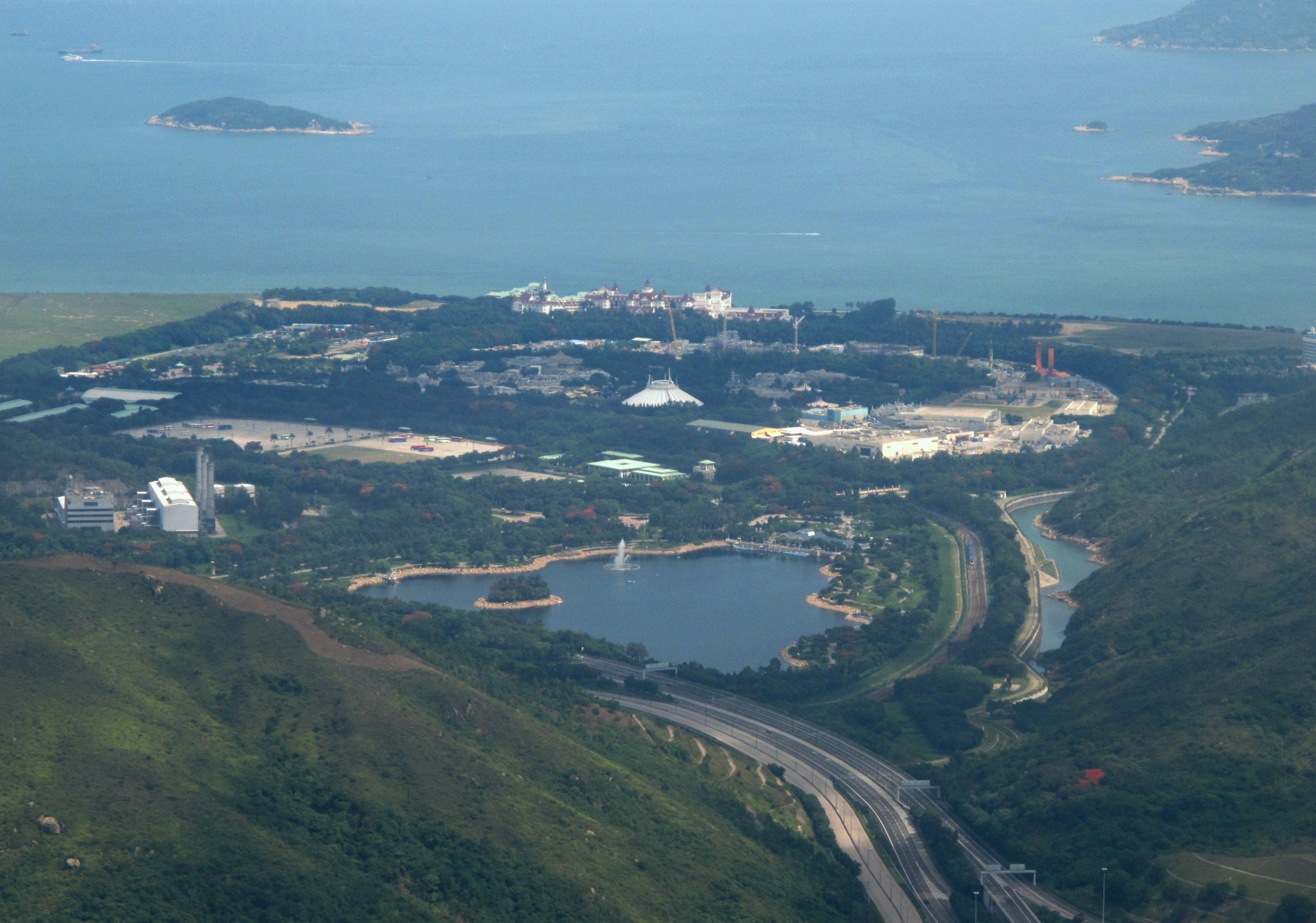
Hong Kong Disneyland Resort in June 2011

Reclamation of land started in 2000. The SARS outbreak of 2003 did slow but not stop building and saved HK$1 billion as construction cost dropped. Inspiration Lake, an artificial lake of some 12 hectares, was also created to serve the resort's water irrigation needs.

In an effort to avoid cultural friction similar to what happened when Euro Disney Resort opened in France, Disney has taken efforts to make this new park reflect the local culture. Feng shui consultants have helped with the layout of the park and the grounds. Incense was burned when the construction of each building was completed, and one of the main ballrooms is 888 square meters in size, as eight is an auspicious number in Chinese culture, signifying fortune. The hotels will skip the number four when numbering of their floors because four is considered bad luck. Hong Kong Disneyland Cast Members speak English, Cantonese, and Mandarin. Around 500 of the Grand Opening Team were trained at Walt Disney World Resort while their home park was being constructed.

Disney originally planned to serve shark fin soup, a traditional Chinese delicacy, at wedding banquets. Animal rights groups protested in June 2005, citing the declining shark population in global waters and the cruel methods sometimes used of cutting the fin and discarding the live sharks back into the water.

At first, Disney removed shark fin soup from its menu but said that it would still offer the soup if their clients insisted on having it served at their wedding. They said they would distribute leaflets about shark conservation to discourage the choice.

However, after constant and continuous pressure from environmental groups and schoolchildren, shareholders concerned about the company's image, Disney announced on 24 June 2005 that shark fin soup will not be served at all, because, according to their press release, "After careful consideration and a thorough review process, we were not able to identify an environmentally sustainable fishing source, leaving us no alternative except to remove shark's fin soup from our wedding banquet menu."

Health inspectors were asked to remove their caps and badges when coming to inspect the facility after several reports of food poisoning. Although two of the officers did so, the department took offence.

=== Opening Day ===
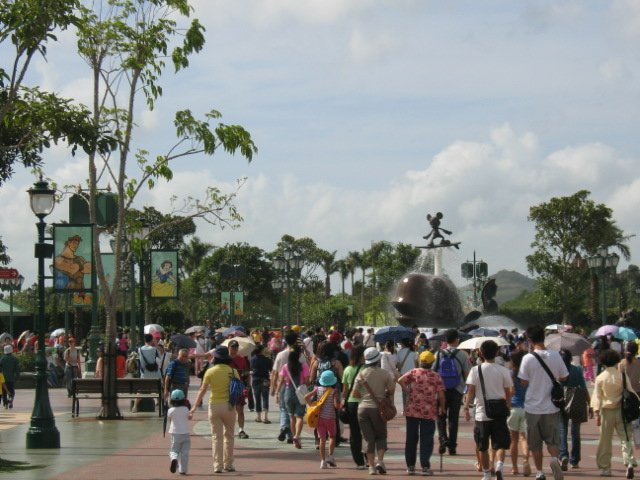
Park Promenade

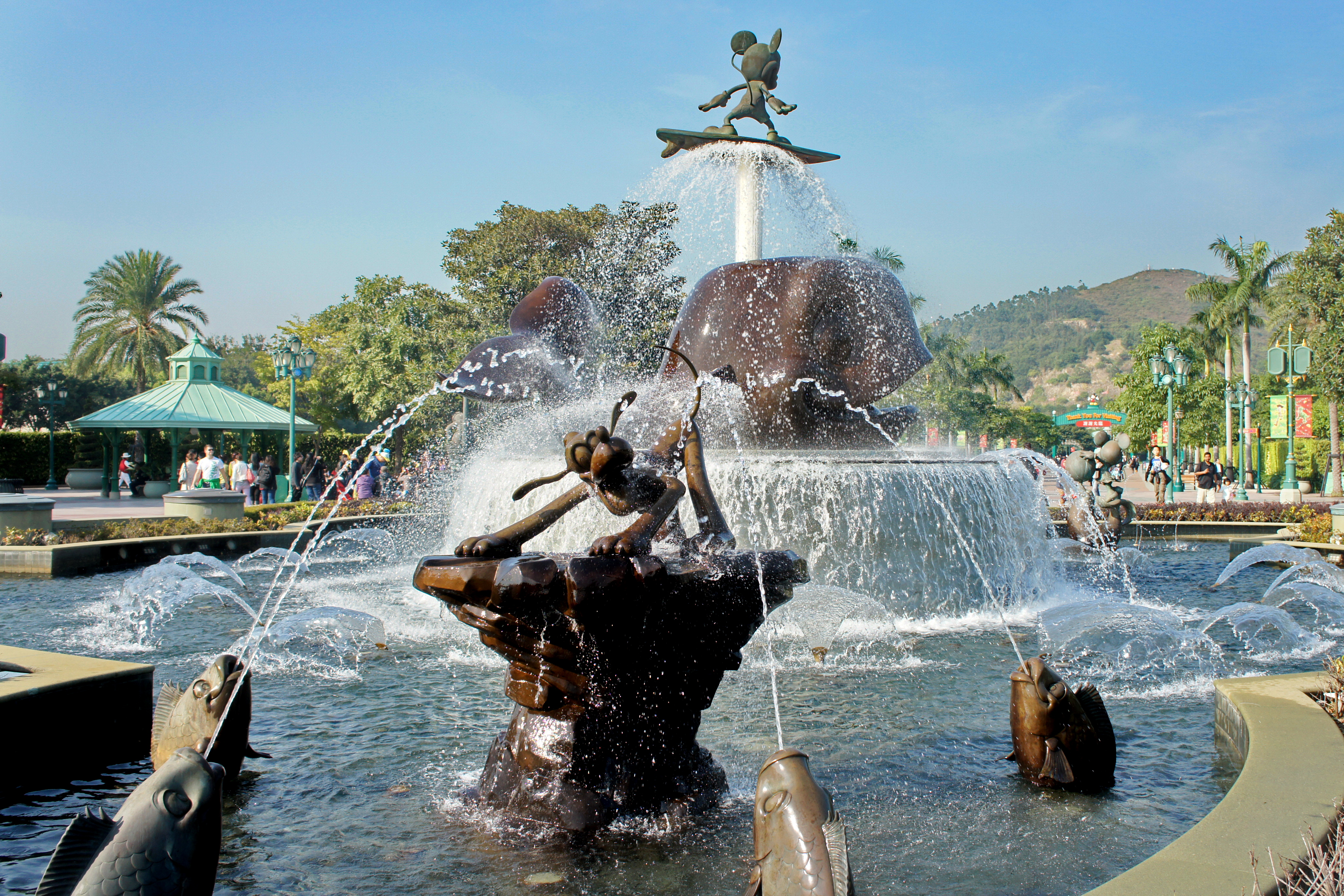
Park Promenade Fountain

On 12 September 2005, Hong Kong Disneyland Resort and its theme park, Hong Kong Disneyland, officially opened.

The park was projected to attract five to six million visitors in its opening year, mostly locals, tourists from mainland China and nearby Asian countries. Initially, the resort gained success during rehearsal stages; however, not long after the park officially opened, a number of locals criticised the size of the park and the attractiveness of the rides and attractions in the park.

From 23 to 29 July 2006, Hong Kong Disneyland Resort hosted the 2006 Little League Baseball Asia-Pacific Region Tournament. The resort constructed two seaview stadiums and baseball pitches between its Disney Resort hotels for the tournament. The event attracted approximately 2,000 fans.

To boost park attendance, Hong Kong Disneyland introduced Summer Passes in summer 2006 to attract more visitors. Each Summer passholder could visit the park without limits throughout summer 2006 for HK$450. The park also provided exclusive treats for the Summer Passholder in the summer holidays to encourage them to visit the park several times, such as extending the operating hours of Fantasyland for passholders and releasing limited pins for passholders to purchase. Apart from these, the park offered free tickets to the friends and family members of the cast members. Each cast member can invite a limited number of friends and family members to visit Disneyland every day during the summer. Although the park had sold more than 60,000 Summer Passes throughout summer 2006, the park missed its target of 5.6 million in its first year, with only about 5.2 million guests entering the park during the first year of operation. The government overestimated Hong Kong Disneyland's attendance numbers during the Asian Financial Crisis. Rumour suggested that the relatively low-key celebration of the 1st Anniversary was due to the disappointing performance of the theme park.

The Hong Kong park's attendance continued to be disappointing according to the Walt Disney Company's third-quarter performance released in August 2007. In addition, the South China Morning Post estimated the attendance of Hong Kong Disneyland will reach 4 million in its second year, far lower than its first year of operation, citing unnamed sources. The SCMP's sources are still unknown, and some of its speculation is a bit overly optimistic. In December 2007, the Disney park admitted that the park had only attracted 4 million visitors in the year 2006–2007, which had fallen 23 percent when compared to the first year attendance.

A new shopping district called Downtown Disney, as well as the third hotel, are taken into discussions. For long-term construction, with the reclaimed land reserved for the Phase Two Extension and the Disneyland park being blocked by the Park Promenade, a pedestrian walkway which links the Disneyland Resort station, Disneyland park, Hong Kong Disneyland Hotel, and Disneyland Resort Pier. It is expected that a second Disney theme park will be built on that site. A Phase Three Extension is also being considered by the Walt Disney Company and the Hong Kong Government.

On 10 January 2012, The Standard reported that Hong Kong Disneyland plans to build 4 more hotels. Disneyland's proposal includes building one large hotel and three smaller vacation-style hotels to be connected by a mini-tram system. In June 2012, the Hong Kong Economic Times reports that the Government of Hong Kong is hoping to start discussion with Hong Kong Disneyland about building a second Disney theme park for the resort.

On 6 January 2015, the third hotel broke ground. It was known as Disney Explorers Lodge, financed jointly by The Walt Disney Company (HK$1.7 billion), Hong Kong Government (HK$1.7 billion) and Hong Kong Disneyland (HK$600 million) itself, the hotel opened on 30 April 2017 and has 250 rooms. Later that month, the Hong Kong government announced it would talk with Disney about building a second park as part of Phase II of the resort. It is rumored that Phase II will also include the construction of more hotels. On 1 February, it was reported the second park was hoped to be completed by 2020.

In February 2016, Disney announced that the resort reported its first loss in four years, losing HK$148,000,000, and falling 9.3% in annual attendance, to 6.8 million visitors. Analysts attributed this to fewer mainland Chinese tourists visit, hurt by a combination of China's slowdown, political unrest, and a weak yuan relative to the Hong Kong dollar, as well as the upcoming opening of the Shanghai Disney Resort.

On 2 May 2017, The Walt Disney Company's proposal to invest HK$5.45 billion alongside the Hong Kong Government was passed by the finance committee of the Legislative Council, after a total of more than 20 hours of debate in the Legislative Council since March.

In September 2020, the Hong Kong Government announced that they will not purchase the adjacent expansion site for a second park as Hong Kong Disneyland is unable to commit to using the site in the near future.

== The Complex ==
The complex is partially in Tsuen Wan District and partially in Islands District.

It includes:

- Hong Kong Disneyland, based on and modeled after the original Disneyland park in California, features 8 themed areas.

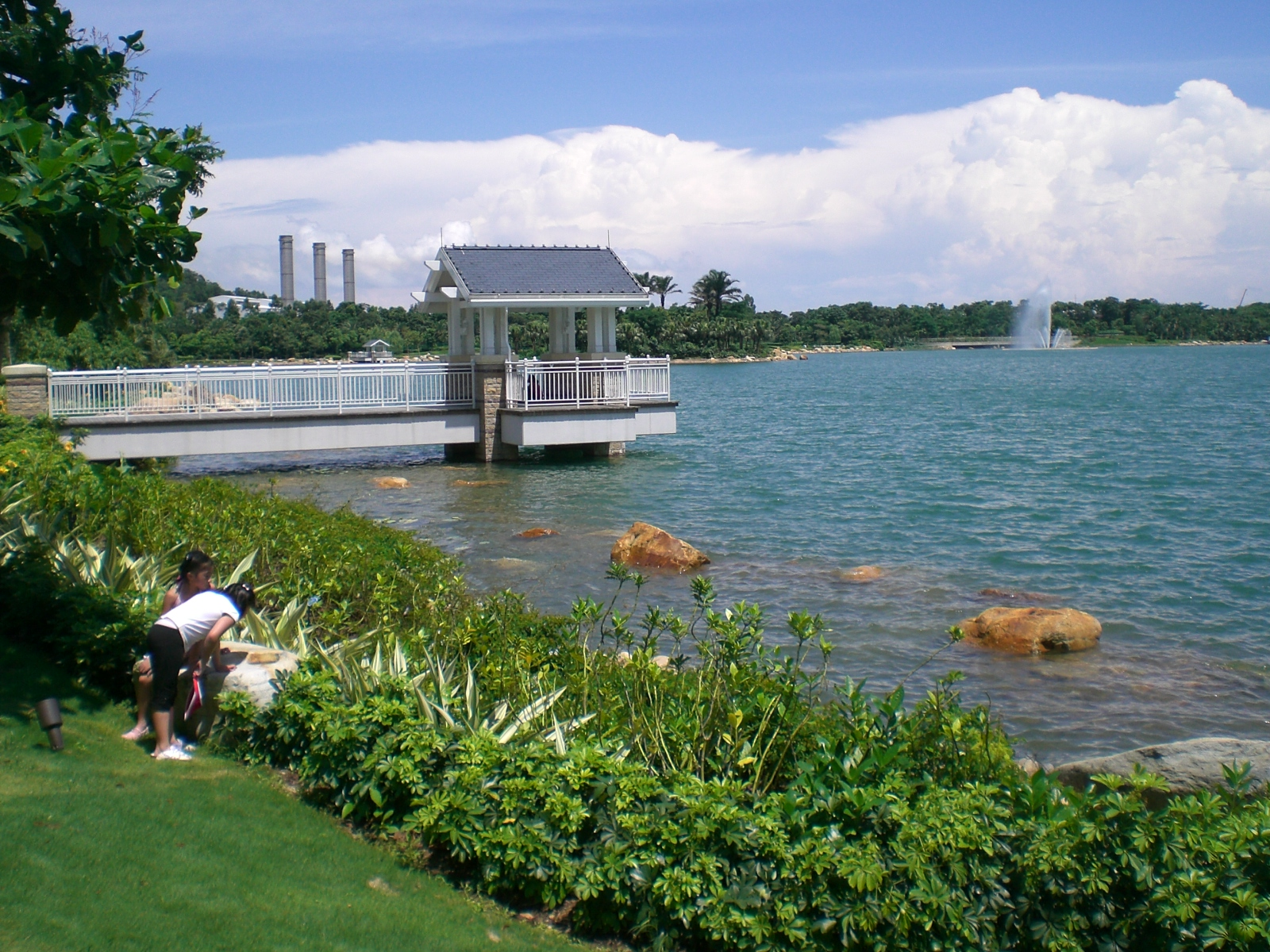
Inspiration Lake

- Inspiration Lake, an artificial lake for recreational purpose and also serves the source of irrigation for the resort.

=== Hotels ===
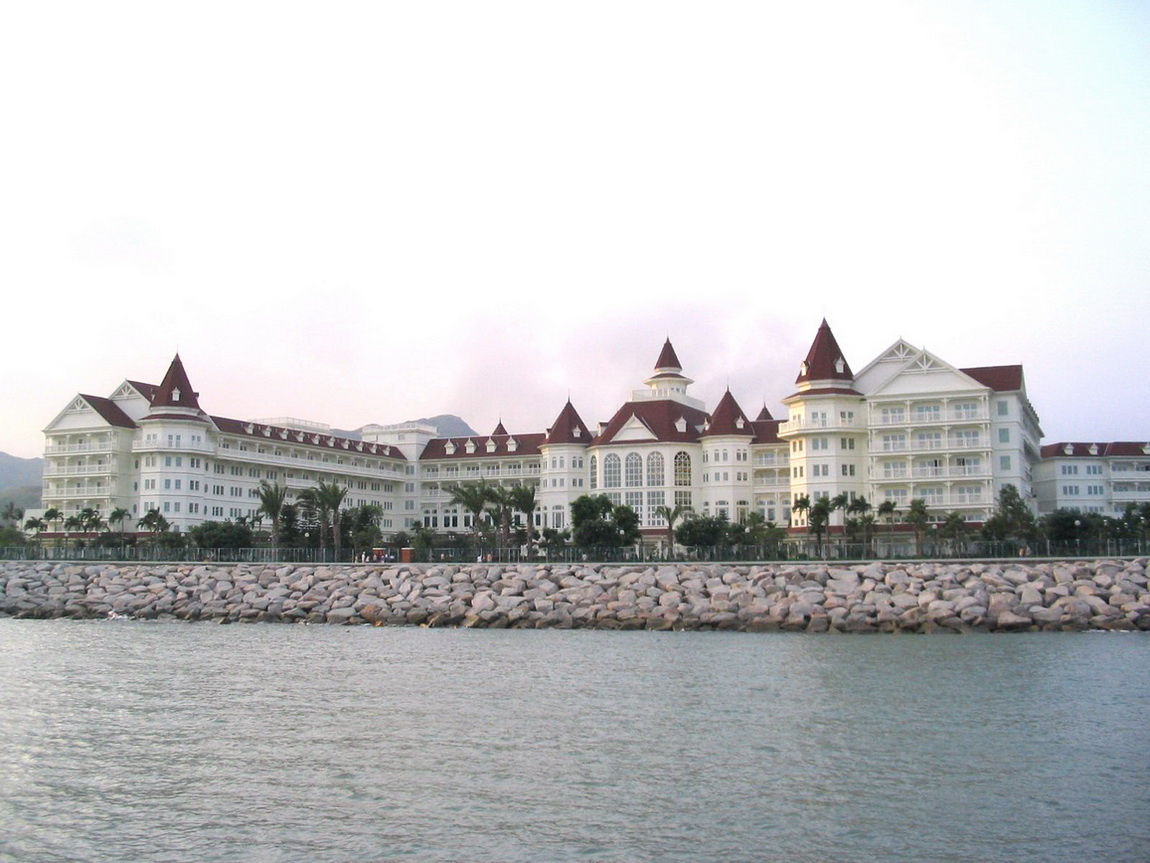
Hong Kong Disneyland Hotel

There are three hotels in the Resort, located on the seashore of the reclaimed land and facing the South China sea, with about 1,750 rooms in total. There is also land reserved for a fourth Disney hotel, which will be located between Hong Kong Disneyland Hotel and Disney Explorers Lodge.

- Hong Kong Disneyland Hotel, a 400-room Victorian-era themed hotel inspired by Disney's Grand Floridian Resort & Spa and the Parisian Disneyland Hotel.
- Disney's Hollywood Hotel, a 600-room art deco style hotel themed to 1930s Hollywood, features lawns covering 8.5 hectares (21 acres) resembling the Hollywood glamour.
- Disney Explorers Lodge, a 750-room exploration themed hotel with four themed areas: Polynesian, Asian, South American rainforest and African plains. It is the biggest hotel in the resort and opened on 30 April 2017.

=== Transport ===
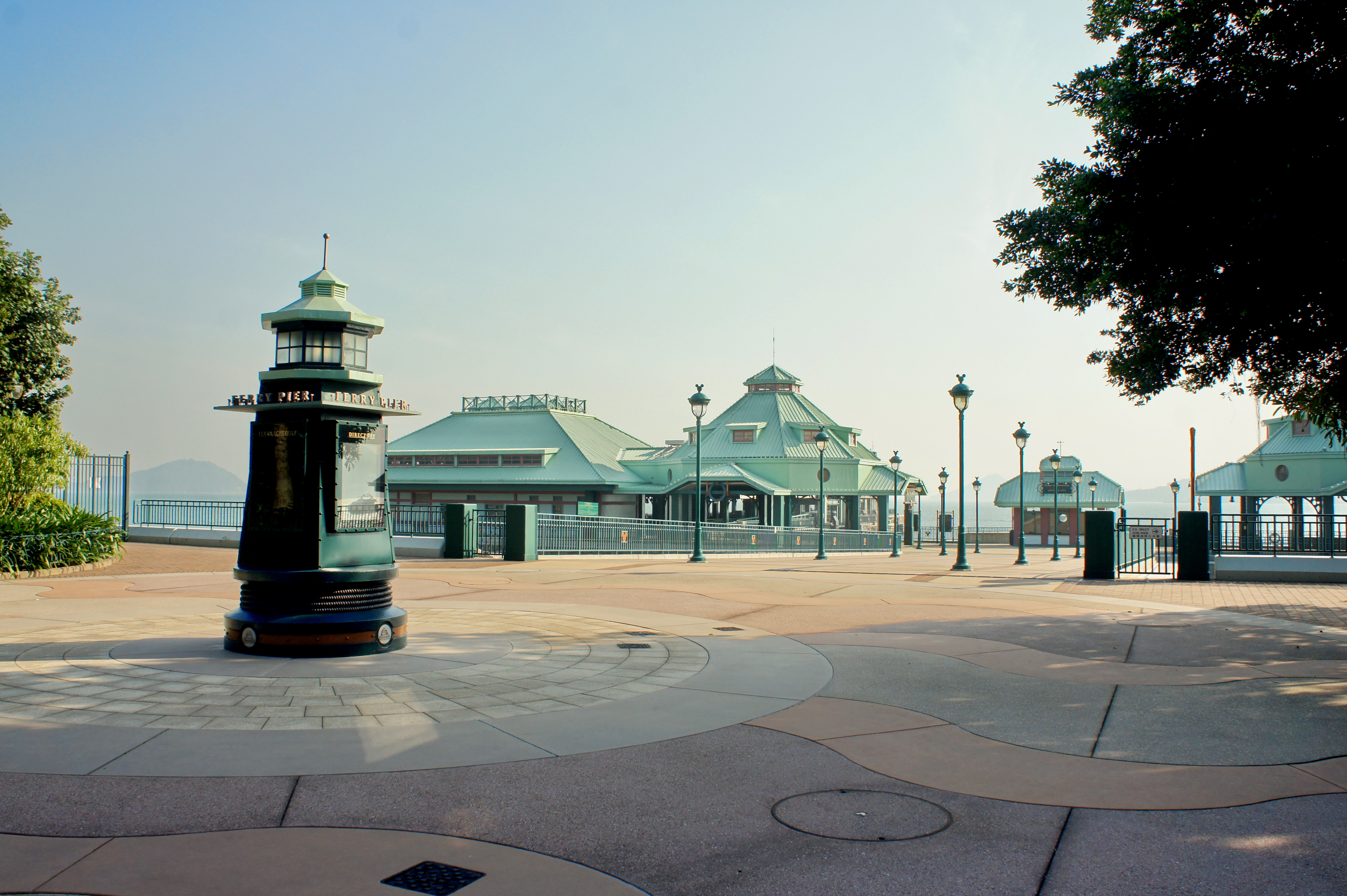
Disneyland Resort Pier

The Resort has the key advantage of being linked to Hong Kong's public transit system. It is accessible via train from Hong Kong International Airport and the city centre.

Inside the Resort free shuttle bus service is operated serving hotel guests.

Since December 2016, the Star Ferry offers a daily trip from Tsim Sha Tsui Star Ferry pier in Kowloon to the Disneyland Resort pier, with a journey of about 45 minutes on their newly refurbished "World Star" boat.

== Hong Kong International Theme Parks ==
Hong Kong International Theme Parks, Limited (HKITP) is the joint venture between Government of Hong Kong and The Walt Disney Company in which they respectively own 52% and 48% currently.

At the start, the Hong Kong Government held a 57% stake, while The Walt Disney Company had 43%. But after the expansion plans were announced in 2009, when The Walt Disney Company invested HK$3.63 billion (US$465 million), Hong Kong Government's holdings were reduced to 52% while The Walt Disney Company's shares increased to 48%.

== Profitability ==
The resort operated at a loss from the time it opened in 2005 until 2012, when it first turned a profit. It was unprofitable again in 2015, running a HK$148 million loss that year. This increased to a loss of HK$171 million in 2016 and HK$345 million in 2017. The resort continued to operate at a loss through 2023 before returning to a record net profit in 2024 after 9 consecutive years of losses. Hong Kong Disneyland became debt-free for the first time in 2025, fully paying off term loans from the SAR government and its parent Walt Disney Company with record profits and attendance made in 2024.

== See also ==
- Hidden Mickey
- Large amusement railways
- Rail transport in Walt Disney Parks and Resorts
- Shanghai Disney Resort
- Tourism in Hong Kong
