= Penny's Bay =

Area of Lantau Island, Hong Kong

Coordinates: 22°19′N 114°02′E

- Traditional Chinese: 竹篙灣
- Simplified Chinese: 竹篙湾
Transcriptions
Standard Mandarin
- Hanyu Pinyin: Zhúgāowān
Yue: Cantonese
- Jyutping: zuk1 gou1 waan1

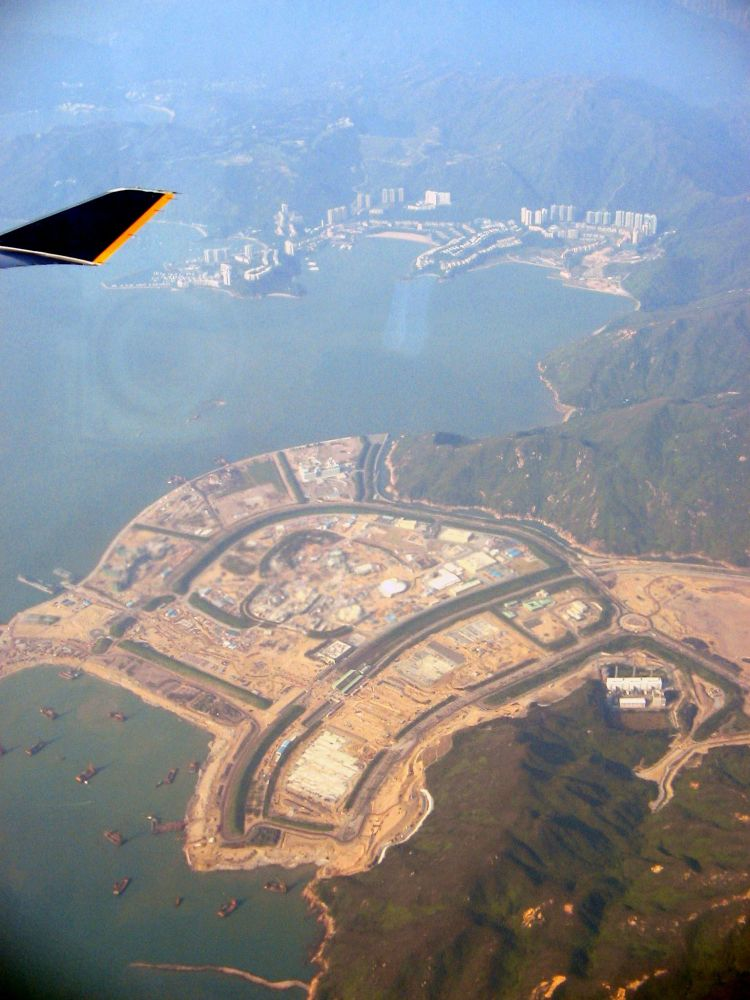
Penny's Bay

Penny's Bay or Chok Ko Wan (Chinese: 竹篙灣) is a bay in north-eastern Lantau Island, and had been a port since the Ming dynasty. The bay has since been reclaimed and is the site of the Hong Kong Disneyland Resort, which consists of the Hong Kong Disneyland theme park, Disneyland Hotel, and Disney's Hollywood Hotel, and the Inspiration Lake. During the COVID-19 pandemic, it became home to Penny's Bay Community Isolation Facility. It is connected by a highway and a rail connection on the MTR Disneyland Resort line to Sunny Bay station.

Penny's Bay is located in Tsuen Wan District, but a small southern portion falls in Islands District.

== Dioxin contamination ==
Before the reclamation of the bay, Cheoy Lee Shipyard operated in the bay from 1964 to April 2001. The Government acquired the land from the owners for the sum of HK$1.48 billion, and paid HK$22.7 million in additional compensation, according to a Public Works Subcommittee paper from May 2002.

The Government had not realised that its operations accumulated 30,000 m^{3} (1,100,000 cu ft) of soil contaminated with dioxin, heavy metals, and hydrocarbons. The solid waste was dug up and transferred to To Kau Wan on the north shore of Northeast Lantau for temporary processing, and finally incinerated at the Chemical Waste Treatment Centre on the Tsing Yi Island amid protests by residents. The total cleanup cost not taken into account at the time of acquisition was estimated at HK$450 million.

== Penny's Bay Community Isolation Facility ==
Penny's Bay Community Isolation Facility (formerly Penny's Bay Quarantine Centre, 竹篙灣檢疫中心) has a total capacity of 1,916 people. During the COVID-19 pandemic in Hong Kong, in 2021 it was used to house US arrivals to Hong Kong for one week as part of a mandatory quarantine applicable to travellers regardless of testing or vaccine status. In 2022, it was changed to a quarantine facility for mild-symptom cases. Hong Kong's last remaining community isolation centre for Covid patients, Penny's Bay on Lantau, officially closed 1 March 2023.

== See also ==
- Tsing Chau Tsai Peninsula
- Penny's Bay Power Station
- Pa Tau Kwu
