= Hidden Mickey =

Subtle representation of Mickey Mouse

The shape of a "Mickey".

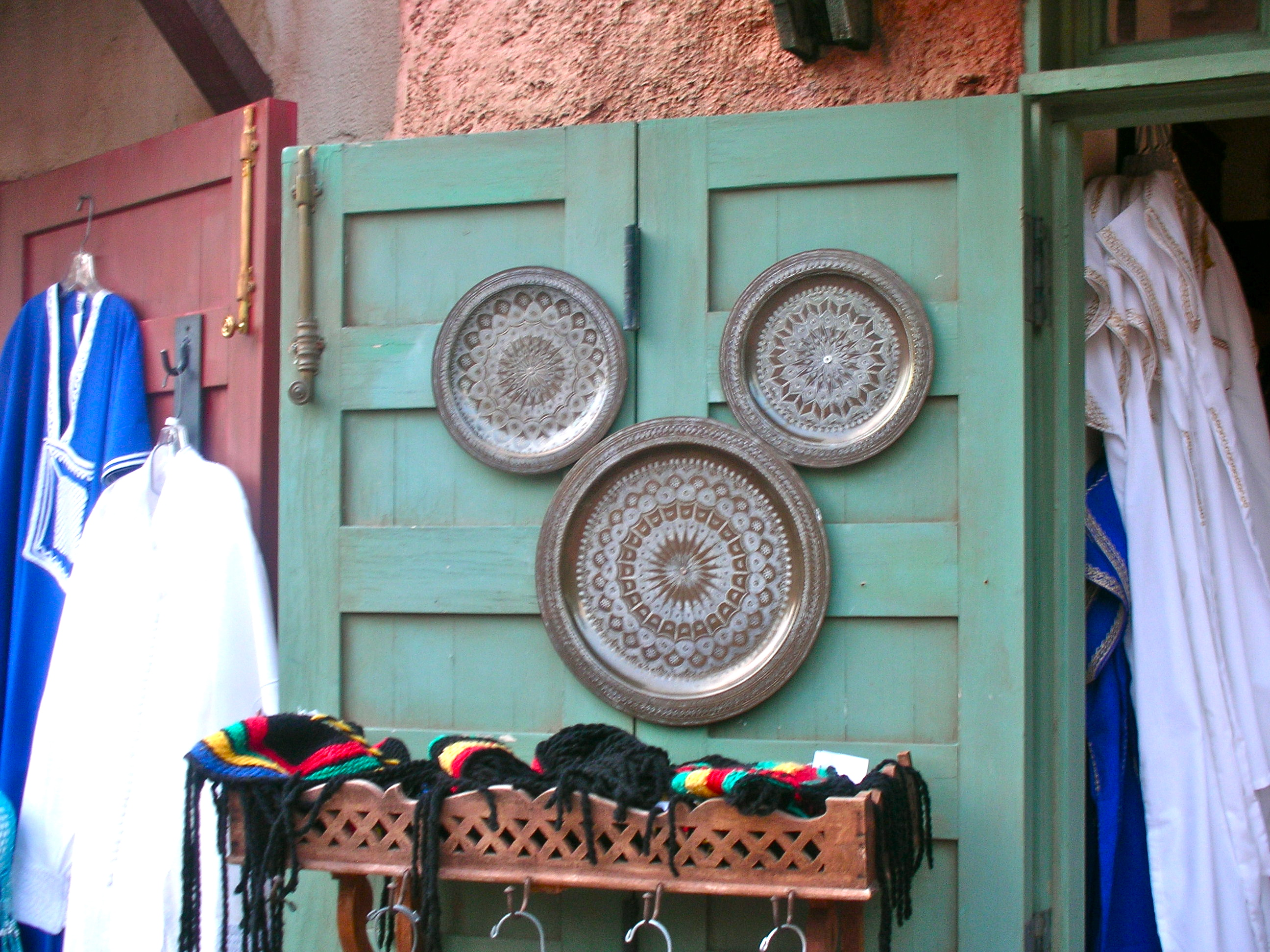
A Hidden Mickey in a shop in the Morocco Pavilion at Epcot in Walt Disney World, Florida

A Hidden Mickey is a representation of Mickey Mouse that has been inserted subtly into the design of a ride, attraction, or other location in a Disney theme park, Disney property, animated film, feature-length movie, TV series, or other Disney product. The most common Hidden Mickey is a formation of three circles that may be perceived as the silhouette of the head and ears of Mickey Mouse, often referred to by Disney aficionados as a "Classic Mickey". Mickeys may be painted, made up of objects (such as rocks, or three plates on a table), or be references such as someone wearing Mickey Mouse Club ears in a painting. Hidden Mickeys can take on many sizes and forms.

Hidden Mickeys are slipped into many Disney animated films as Easter eggs. They are also hidden in architecture and attractions in Disney parks and resorts, and in studio buildings and many other Disney-related features.

== History ==
The first published sighting of a Hidden Mickey was made by Arlen Miller, who wrote an article on Hidden Mickeys for WDW's Eyes and Ears (a Cast Member weekly publication) in 1989. The article listed Hidden Mickeys found in the Disney theme parks. Months later the author was contacted by Disney News for more information, and the resulting article made the news of Hidden Mickeys spread worldwide.

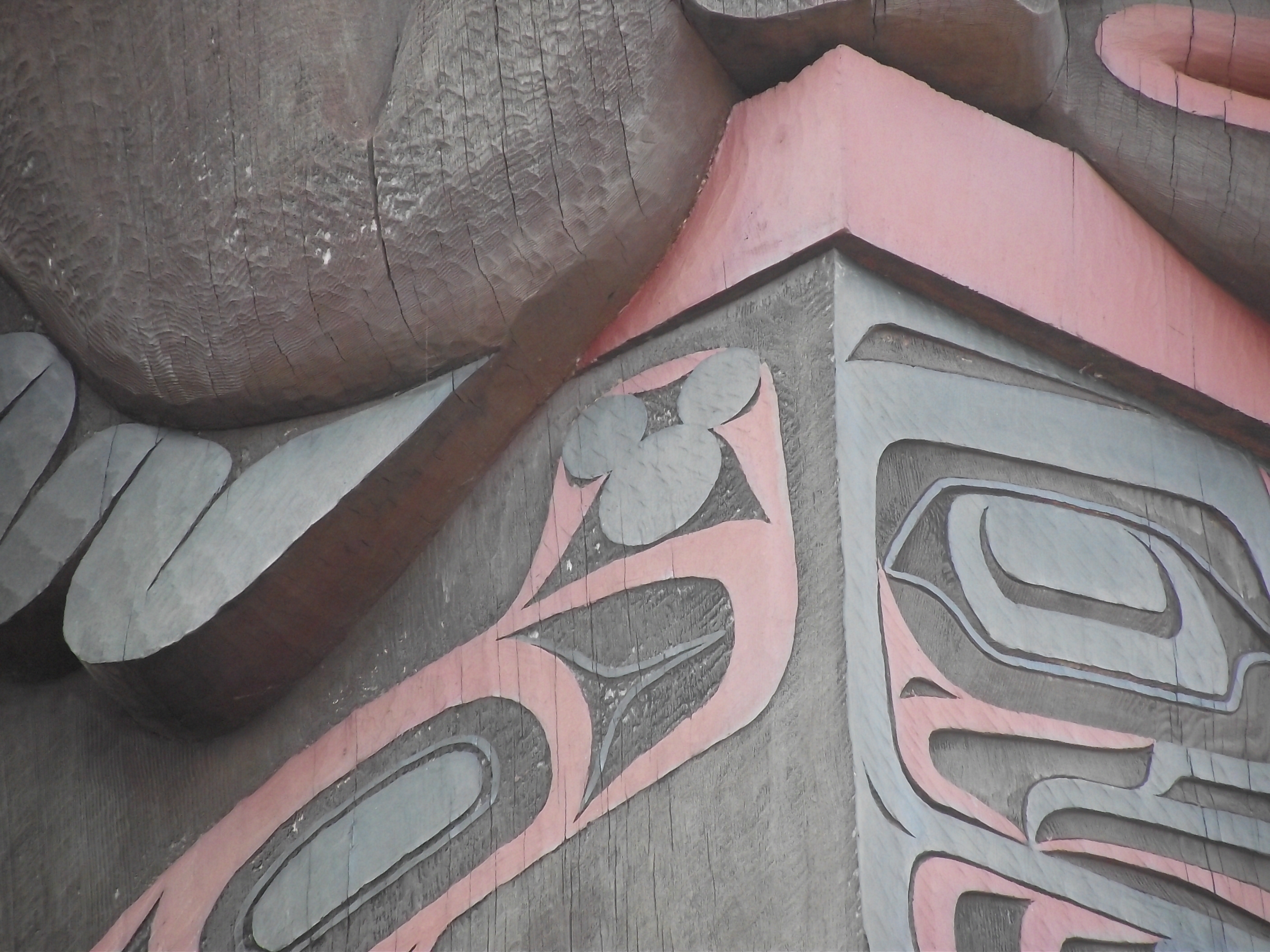
A Hidden Mickey on a totem pole at the Canada Pavilion at Epcot.

The history of Hidden Mickeys can be traced back to when the Imagineers were designing Epcot in the late 1970s and early 1980s. Disney had decided that EPCOT Center would be a more adult themed park, including selling alcohol. As alcohol and Disney characters were deemed to be an improper combination, it was decided that none of the Disney characters, including Mickey Mouse and Minnie Mouse, would ever be seen at EPCOT Center. To some of the Imagineers working on EPCOT Center, this was taken as a challenge. They started including hidden Mickey Mouse profiles into various design elements of that park. As the park began to grow, guest comments led Disney to include the characters in EPCOT Center, but tradition was well-established by that point. Hidden Mickeys (as well as other Disney characters like Minnie Mouse) have become a staple of all theme park designs since. Because of the popularity of Hidden Mickeys, Imagineers are encouraged to place them in new constructions.

Throughout the years, Hidden Mickeys spread in popularity as a pop-culture phenomenon. They have also appeared in animated movies.

=== Hidden Mickey 50 Ears ===
As part of the Happiest Homecoming on Earth at Disneyland, the park had been decorated with 50 hidden Mickey 50 Ears, the official symbol of the 50th anniversary of Disneyland. The symbol is the traditional Mickey face and ears, but with a number 50 in the center. Before the 50th anniversary of Disneyland ended on September 30, 2006, the Hidden 50 Mickeys were gradually removed.

== Locations ==
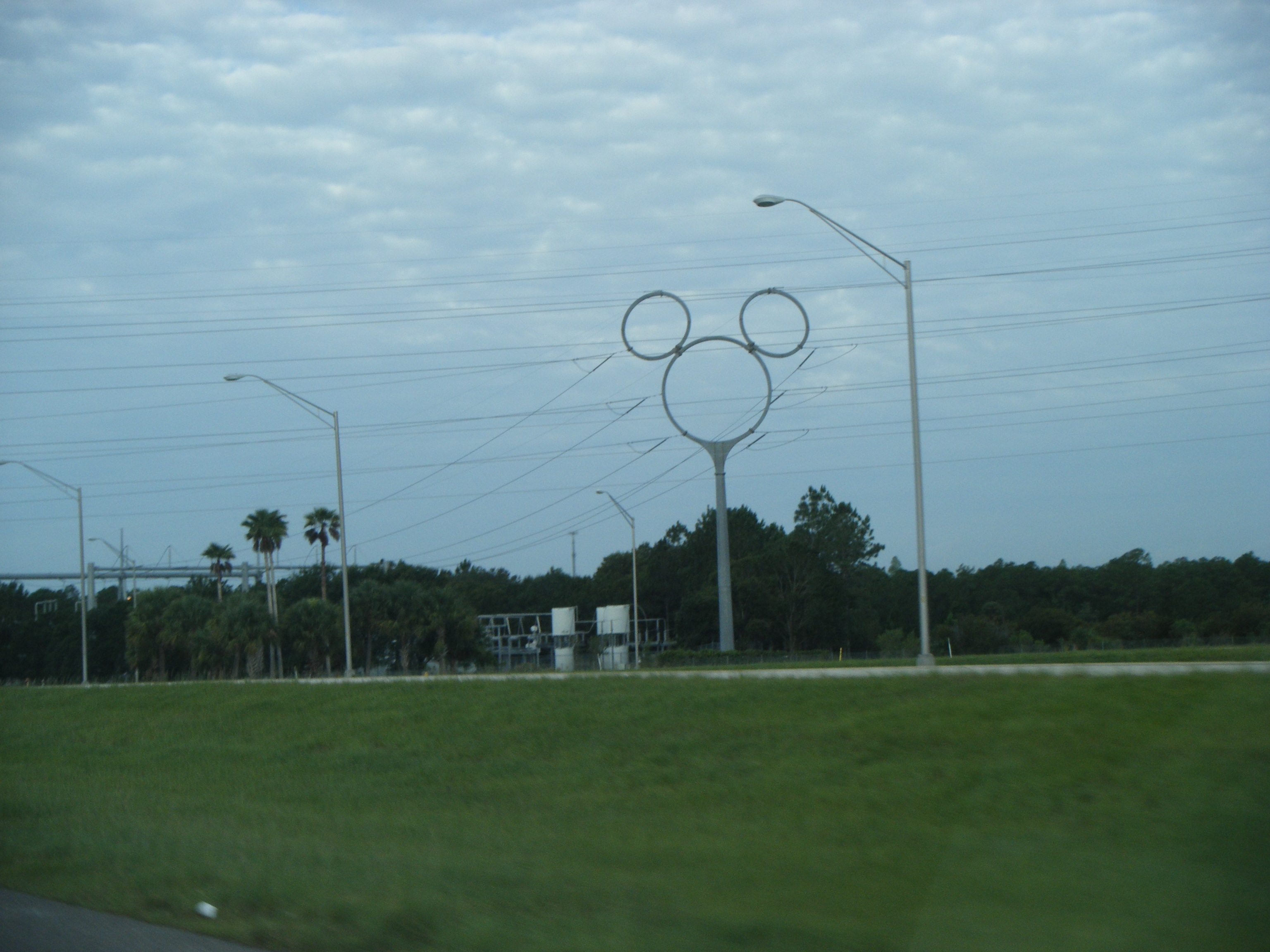
A Hidden Mickey on an electric transmission tower (Mickey pylon) in Celebration, Florida.

Common locations for deliberate Hidden Mickeys include the Walt Disney Parks and Resorts, where they are most commonly found in attractions, stores, and decor around the environment. Although approximately 1,000 Hidden Mickeys have been recorded, The Walt Disney Company has never compiled a complete list of all the "known" or "deliberate" Mickeys (whether created by an Imagineer or a Disney Cast Member), so there is no way to confirm or disprove any reported Mickey sightings.

The book Discovering the Magic Kingdom: An Unofficial Disneyland Vacation Guide - Second Edition has the largest printed listing of Hidden Mickeys for the Disneyland Resort in Anaheim. The book lists 419 Hidden Mickeys that can be found at Disneyland Park, Downtown Disney, the three Disneyland hotels, and Disney's California Adventure.

== In media ==
- In the George Lopez episode "George Goes to Disneyland" there was a contest to see how many Hidden Mickeys a viewer could find. The winner won $10,015 and a trip to Disneyland.
- The animated film The Lion King 1½ features a total of 20 Hidden Mickeys among the scenes of the film, with one of the bonus features of the film's DVD being to find them while watching the film.
- The Lilo & Stitch anime spin-off series Stitch! featured several Hidden Mickey in episodes, some of which were directly referenced in the series' English dub.
- In Epic Mickey 2: The Power of Two, there are many Hidden Mickeys that Mickey can photograph throughout the game. There are also hidden Oswalds.
- The Kingdom Hearts series has several Hidden Mickeys throughout different games, with Kingdom Hearts III placing a larger emphasis on finding them in several different worlds; they are referred to in-game as "Lucky Emblems". Finding these Lucky Emblems and taking in-game pictures of them are important, as depending on the difficulty, a certain number are required to unlock the game's secret ending.
- In Super Smash Bros. Ultimate, where Kingdom Hearts protagonist Sora is a downloadable fighter, he retains the Hidden Mickey token attached to his keyblade, the Kingdom Key. The Hidden Mickey token is the only reference to a non-Kingdom Hearts Disney property in the game, as everything else featured in Kingdom Hearts originating from Disney’s other media were omitted. Characters original to the Kingdom Hearts games were included, however.

== See also ==
- D23
- Dave Smith
- Disneyana
- Don Rosa
- List of filmmaker's signatures
