= World of Disney =

Retail stores operated by Disney

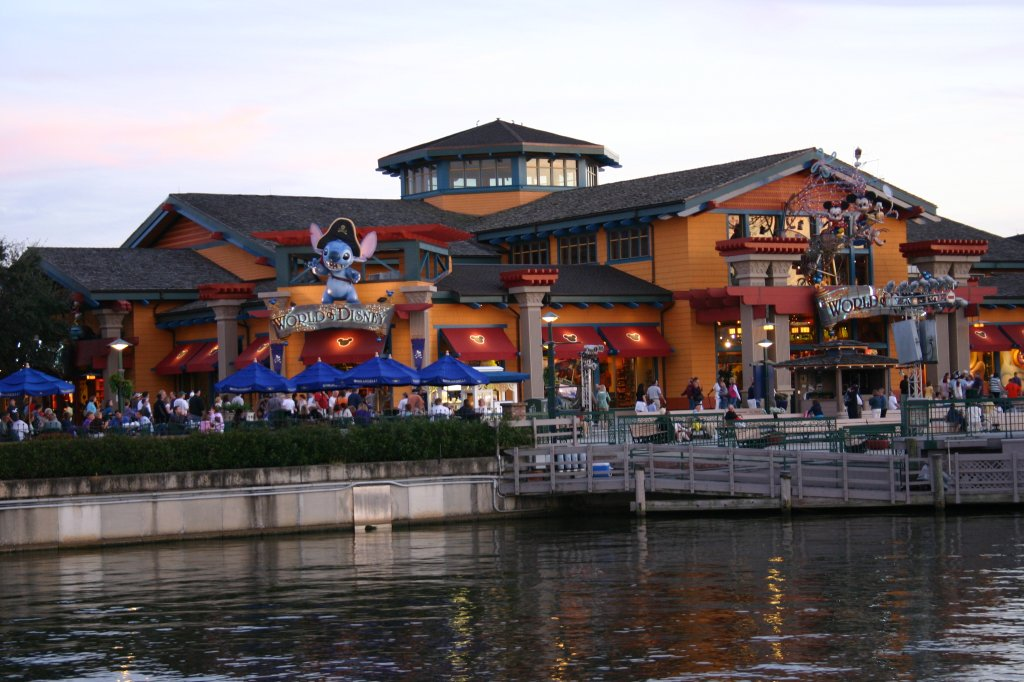
- Florida location in February 2008
- Industry: Retail
- Founded: October 3, 1996 in Disney Springs
- Number of locations: 4
- Parent: Disney Parks Merchandising

The World of Disney is the flagship chain of specialty retail stores owned and operated by the merchandise division of Disney Experiences, a subsidiary of The Walt Disney Company. Currently, there are four locations that sell Disney products.

== Background ==
Disney had entered the retailing field outside of the parks with the first Disney Store opened in the Glendale Galleria in Glendale, California on March 28, 1987. In 1994, Disney Stores opened its flagship location in New York City at a corner of 55th Street and Fifth Avenue.

The World of Disney has always been operated as part of Disney Parks and is not associated with the Disney Store.

== Locations ==
The current operating locations are all located at the shopping districts of Disney theme park resorts and do not require tickets or park entry.

- Orlando, United States – Walt Disney World Resort – Disney Springs
- Anaheim, United States – Disneyland Resort – Downtown Disney
- Paris, France – Disneyland Paris – Disney Village
- Shanghai, China – Shanghai Disney Resort – Disneytown
- International Waters - Disney Adventure

A store following the same concept operates as Bon Voyage! at Tokyo Disney Resort, on the way between Tokyo Disneyland and Maihama Station.

== History ==
The first World of Disney store opened October 2, 1996 in the Disney Village Marketplace (currently Disney Springs) at Walt Disney World Resort. (Note: Smith, Dave. Page 620. Disney A to Z - The Updated Official Encyclopedia. 1998.) At approximately 51,000 square feet (4,700 m^{2}) of retail space, it is said to offer the largest selection of Disney character merchandise in the world, according to the company. A 2006 renovation added a small princess-themed salon called Bibbidi Bobbidi Boutique, plus a new children's merchandise area inspired by Pirates of the Caribbean and Stitch. The Boutique was moved out of this store with the Disney Springs overhaul of Downtown Disney in mid to late 2016 to Once Upon a Toy store, located in the Marketplace section.

A second, 40,000 square feet location opened on January 1, 2001, coinciding with the opening of Downtown Disney of the Disneyland Resort in Anaheim.

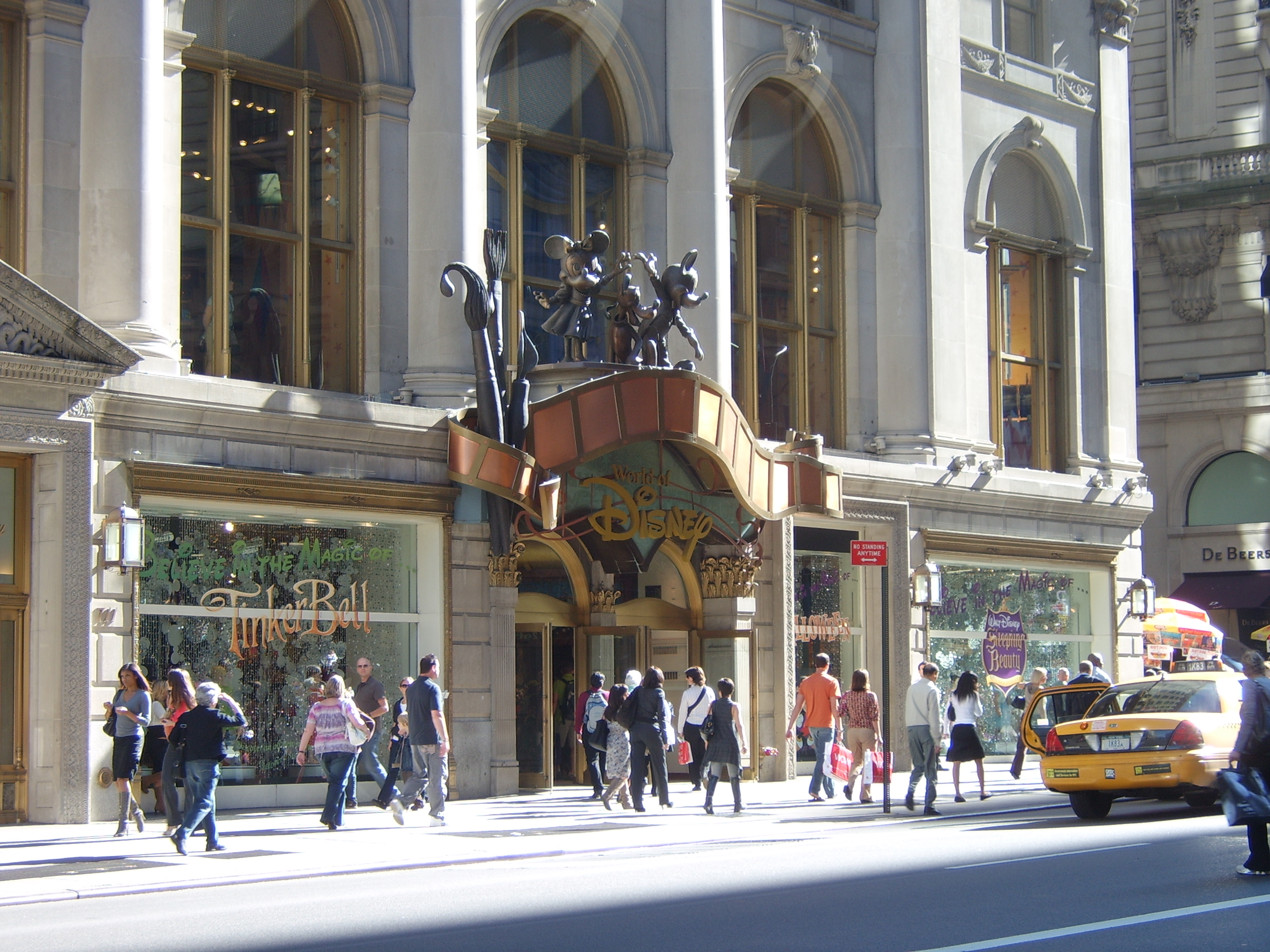
Fifth Avenue, Manhattan, New York City

On October 5, 2004, a third location opened within a three-story New York City (30,000-square-foot) space formerly occupied by the flagship Disney Store on Manhattan's Fifth Avenue as the rest of the Disney Store chain in the US was sold. The store closed on December 31, 2009, and the interior was dismantled on January 4, 2010 to make way for a traditional Disney Store in Times Square in fall 2010 at the former Virgin Megastore location. The rental cost for the location had become unreasonable and Disney had purchased back the US Disney Stores.

Disney Parks' merchandising department added another retail location, Disney Vault 28, its first high-end apparel store, which opened on October 11, 2006 in Downtown Disney. Vault 28 was closed down by the end of September 2017.

An additional location opened at Disney Village in Disneyland Paris on July 12, 2012, the third location currently in operation. The 1,400 square-meters (15,000 square feet) store was a part of a major overhaul for the village. The newest World of Disney location opened in the Disneytown area of the Shanghai Disney Resort at the park's opening on June 14, 2016, bringing the total to four stores in operation.

The flagship store at Downtown Disney in Anaheim started a remodel in 2017 by PCL Construction with a soft reopening on October 19 and a grand opening on October 26, 2018. The remodeling added a back story to the location that it was "a bus depot turned into an animation studio for Disney artists." The Disney Springs location was also remodeled with its grand reopening on October 27.

Disney Adventure, the eighth and largest cruise ship of Disney Cruise Line, contains a World of Disney store on Deck 5, along with a smaller shop called World of Disney Too. Both stores opened upon the ship's maiden voyage on March 10, 2026.
