= Disney Springs =

Shopping center at Walt Disney World

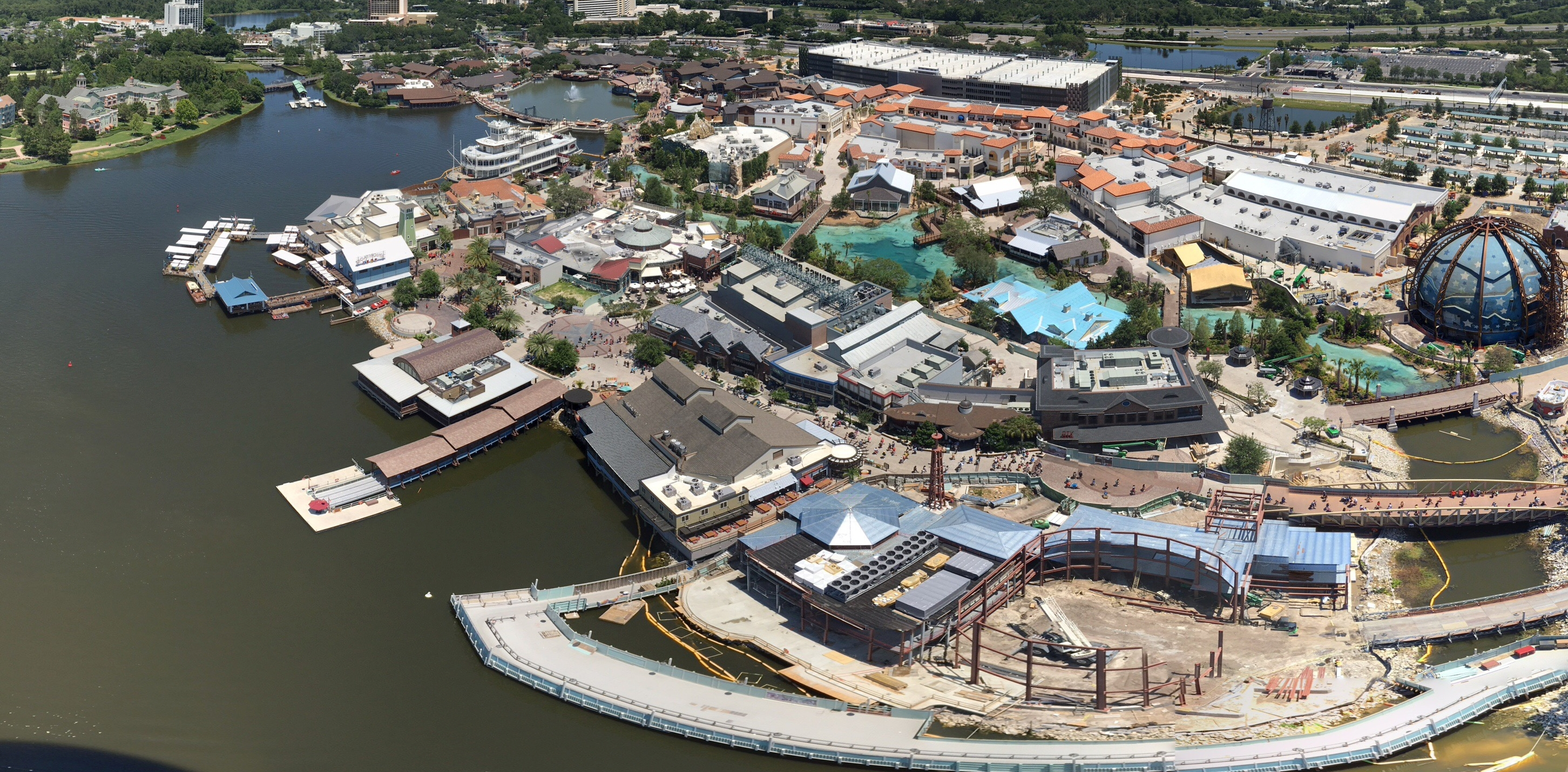
- Aerial view, showing the Town Center area under construction. (May 2016)
- Location: Walt Disney World Resort; Lake Buena Vista, Florida, U.S.
- Coordinates: 28.3702539°N 81.5209851°W
- Opened: March 22, 1975; 51 years ago
- Renovated: 1977; 1997; 2013–2016
- Previous names: Lake Buena Vista Shopping Village (1975–1977); Walt Disney World Village (1977–1989); Disney Village Marketplace (1989–1997); Downtown Disney (1997–2015); Disney Springs (2015–present)
- Developer: The Walt Disney Company
- Manager: Disney Experiences
- Owner: Disney Experiences
- Architect: Walt Disney Imagineering
- Num. of stores: 150+ (at peak)
- Floor area: 1,100,000 sq ft (100,000 m^{2}) or 120 acres (49 ha)
- Floors: 2
- Parking: Several multi-story parking garages
- Public transit: 300, 301, 302, 303, 304, 306, 307, 311, 350; Disney Transport
- Website: Official website
- Building details

Renovating team
- Architect: Stantec (2013–2016)

Disney Springs, formally the Disney Springs Marketplace, is a lifestyle center at the Walt Disney World Resort in Lake Buena Vista, Florida, near Orlando.

First opened on March 22, 1975, as the Lake Buena Vista Shopping Village, it has been expanded and rebranded over the years as Walt Disney World Village in 1977, Disney Village Marketplace in 1989, and Downtown Disney in 1997, becoming Disney Springs in 2015. A similar complex, called Flamingo Crossings, opened on the opposite side of Walt Disney World in 2021.

The 120-acre (49 ha) complex includes four distinct areas: Marketplace, The Landing, Town Center, and West Side. Buses and water taxis operated by Disney Transport provide transportation between Disney Springs and other areas of Walt Disney World. The complex gained a sister district in Anaheim, California, on January 12, 2001, with the addition of Downtown Disney at the Disneyland Resort.

== History ==
=== 1967–1977: Development, opening, and renaming ===
In 1967, the City of Reedy Creek, Florida was established as a subdivision of Orlando. The Walt Disney Company originally intended to build Walt Disney World between I-4 and Highway 535, though Walt Disney wanted the site to be used to construct a shopping mall area, and permanent housing. In 1969, Reedy Creek was renamed after the address for Walt Disney Studios in Burbank, California, Lake Buena Vista, and after Walt's death, permanent housing was ignored until after the park debuted.

The Lake Buena Vista Shopping Village had its grand opening on March 22, 1975, featuring the Pottery Chalet, the Character Shop, and Toys Fantastique. However, the complex initially struggled, as guests frequently ignored it. As a result, the Lake Buena Vista Shopping Village was renamed Walt Disney World Village in 1977 to help give it a better connection to the resort, encouraging guests to stay on site, though visitation was still not up to the company's expectations. The mall's shops were also renovated to have a European-inspired feel and appearances in 1977.

=== 1977–2011: Early expansion and rebrandings ===
The Empress Lilly opened on May 1, 1977, as a static full-size replica of a paddle steamer riverboat on Village Lake. It is 220 feet (2,600 in) long and 62 feet (740 in) wide, and was built on a submerged concrete foundation designed to resemble a paddle steamer boat. The Empress Lilly was christened by Walt Disney's widow, Lillian Disney, for whom it was named. It originally housed four separate entertainment and dining areas.

With the advent of new management under Michael Eisner in 1984, Disney began looking for ways to keep vacationers on Walt Disney World property longer, and prevent them from leaving for entertainment beyond Disney's borders. To compete with the popularized Church Street Station clubs in downtown Orlando, Disney announced the addition of Pleasure Island, featuring nightclubs, shops, and eateries, to Walt Disney World Village on July 21, 1986. Construction began the following August, with AMC Theatres Pleasure Island 10 slated to debut on December 16, 1988, as the very first venue as part of Pleasure Island. Pleasure Island itself opened on May 1, 1989, the same day as the Disney-MGM Studios (Note: Now called Disney's Hollywood Studios) theme park. Later that year, the complex was renamed Disney Village Marketplace, which was still not effective to attract enough visitors. Pleasure Island was themed after Walt Disney's 1940 film Pinocchio.

Fulton's Crab House (March 2012)

In the mid-1990s, Levy Restaurants signed a contract to operate the Empress Lilly for 20 years. On April 22, 1995, the "ship" closed permanently, and the interior was remodeled and the old smokestacks and paddlewheel were removed due to rust and rot. The restaurant reopened as Fulton's Crab House on March 10, 1996. Around that time, the growth of Walt Disney World created the potential for further expansion, leading to a $1 billion investment in projects across the resort.

On June 20, 1995, major enhancements and expansions were announced for the area, with the Disney Village Marketplace and Pleasure Island being combined into a newly branded district called the Downtown Disney Marketplace, which was introduced on September 7, 1997. To bring visitation to expected numbers, Disney heavily advertised the combined property.

Entrance to West Side (April 2004)

Entrance to AMC Downtown Disney 24 at night (May 2007)

On September 15, 1997, Downtown Disney West Side, a 66-acre (27 ha) expansion, opened as a third shopping, dining, and entertainment area featuring venues such as La Nouba (the former Cirque du Soleil show in residence which closed at the end of 2017), DisneyQuest, and Virgin Megastore. Major changes to the complex also included the conversion of Mickey's Character Shop into the World of Disney, becoming the world's largest Disney store, in addition to the expansion and upgrade of AMC Theatres from ten screens to 24 screens, as well as the opening of Rainforest Cafe and Planet Hollywood. The Wildhouse Store closed on February 25, 2001, followed by Harrington Bay in August 2001. On September 27, 2008, the Pleasure Island nightclubs closed permanently.

Renovations began in late 2010, which created theaters offering enhanced food service, and the movie theater was renamed AMC Downtown Disney 24 Dine-In Theatres, which reopened on May 16, 2011. On November 18, 2010, Disney announced a project named Hyperion Wharf, which was planned to replace the Pleasure Island complex; the former nightclubs would have undergone extensive renovations and retheming to transform into the early twentieth century wharf-themed entertainment area. New shopping and dining locations would have also been added. However, in July 2011, it was announced that these plans were delayed. The plans were later canceled because it was deemed better to totally overhaul the Downtown Disney area.

Blink by Wet Seal opened at Downtown Disney West Side on November 14, 2011.

=== 2013–2019: Renovation and expansion ===
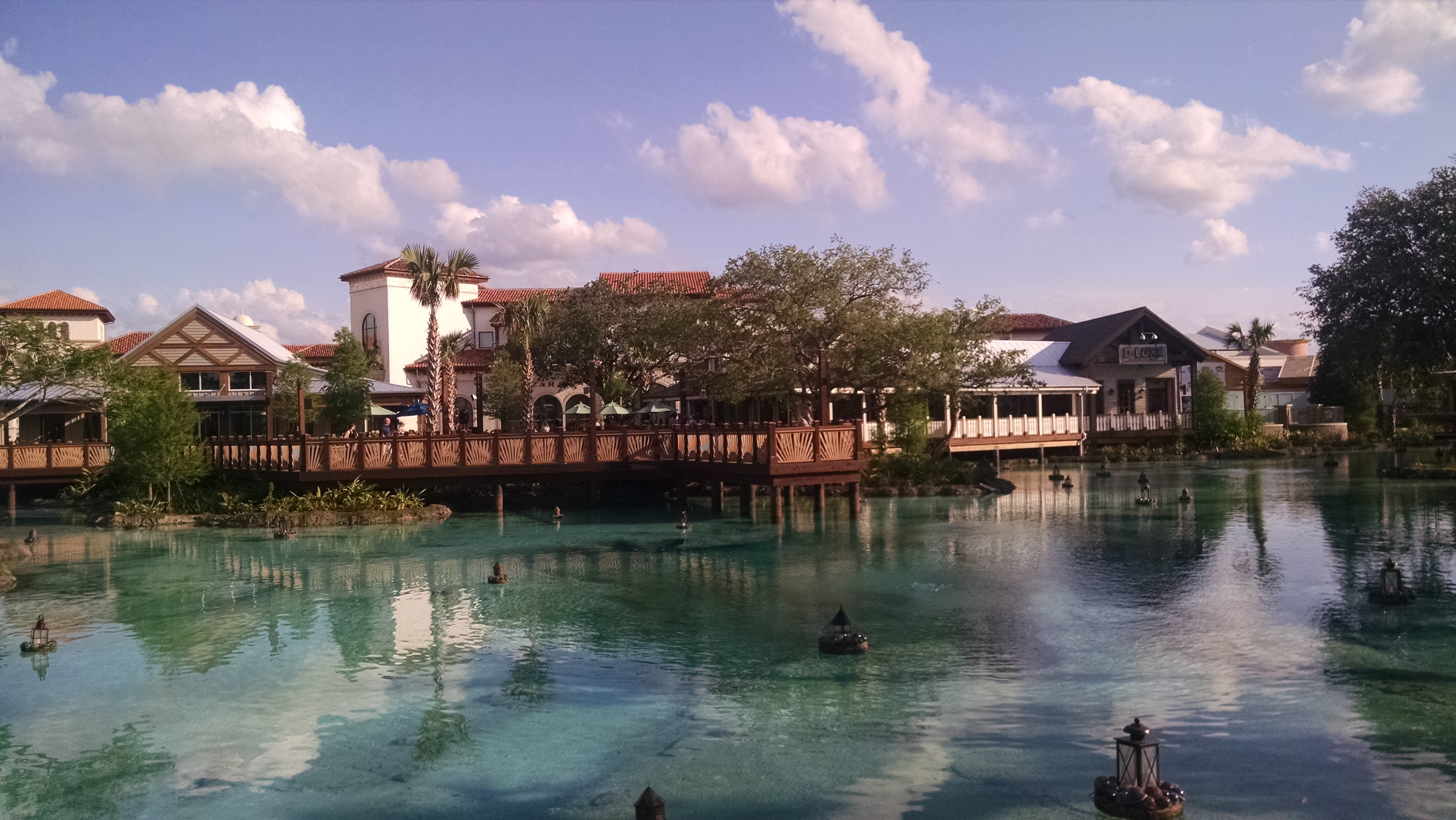
The Springs of the Town Center area, as viewed from The Landing. Welcome Center in gabled building on left. (May 2016)

On March 14, 2013, Walt Disney Parks and Resorts chairman Tom Staggs announced that Downtown Disney would be renovated, expanded, and rebranded as Disney Springs. The three-year renovation and expansion project would include 150 new tenants, two parking structures, and a near-doubling of the mall area. Blink by Wet Seal closed on May 1, 2014, and the space was temporarily replaced with a store selling 2014 FIFA World Cup Soccer merchandise.

New stores were confirmed on January 29, 2015, being The Art of Shaving, APEX by Sunglass Hut, Sound Lion, Chapel Hats, Havaianas, Erin McKenna's Bakery NYC, and Sanuk. In order to facilitate the construction of the area and the increase in capacity, two large parking structures were constructed in previous surface parking lot areas. New construction features include new bridges connecting the complex to Disney's Saratoga Springs resort, with further bridges connecting The Landing to the Marketplace, The Springs, Town Center and West Side. High Line structures were built across the West Side in order to provide both theme and shade. In addition, a new bus terminal, with dedicated bus lanes on Buena Vista Drive, was built; Buena Vista Drive was widened, and a new exit ramp built from Interstate 4 directly to Disney Springs, as part of the traffic upgrade. With the advent of Disney Springs, the former Pleasure Island was redesigned as The Landing in 2015.

Downtown Disney was renamed Disney Springs on September 29, 2015, and the cinema has also been renamed to AMC Disney Springs 24 Dine-In Theatres. Fulton's Crab House closed for major renovations in 2016 to be remodeled into a new restaurant, Paddlefish. As part of the transformation, the ship received new smokestacks and a paddlewheel. Town Center, built just south of The Landing in the surface parking lots, opened on May 15, 2016, completing the major construction on the project. A third parking garage began construction in 2017 across Buena Vista Drive and opened as Grapefruit Garage on April 16, 2019.

=== 2020–present ===
On March 17, 2020, Disney Parks temporarily closed Disney Springs due to the COVID-19 pandemic. On May 7, 2020, it was announced that Disney Springs would begin a phased reopening on May 20.

On May 24, 2024, a nighttime drone show, Dreams That Soar, began running nightly at Disney Springs, which ran until September 2, 2024. The show was revealed with several other highlights at the Walt Disney World Resort. Disney World had also hosted a five-minute drone show titled Starbright Holidays for the 2016 holiday season. As of June 2026, 4 Rivers Cantina Baracoa Food Truck, Cilantro Urban Eatery Food Truck, and GoJuice has closed permanently, while Ghirardelli Soda Fountain & Chocolate Shop plans to relocate and reopen in the spring of 2027.

== Areas ==
Disney Springs is divided into four areas: Marketplace, The Landing, Town Center, and West Side. The complex is bordered by Lake Buena Vista to the north and the parking garages and surface lots to the south. Walt Disney Imagineering took inspiration for Disney Springs from real coastal towns found throughout Florida, such as St. Augustine and Coral Gables.

Creative director Dave Hoffman said about the area, "Each neighborhood reflects its function and [the fictional] time period when it was developed." According to the town's fictional history, Disney Springs was settled in the mid-1800s by a cattle rancher who discovered the town's namesake springs and the town subsequently expanded from the springs outwards.

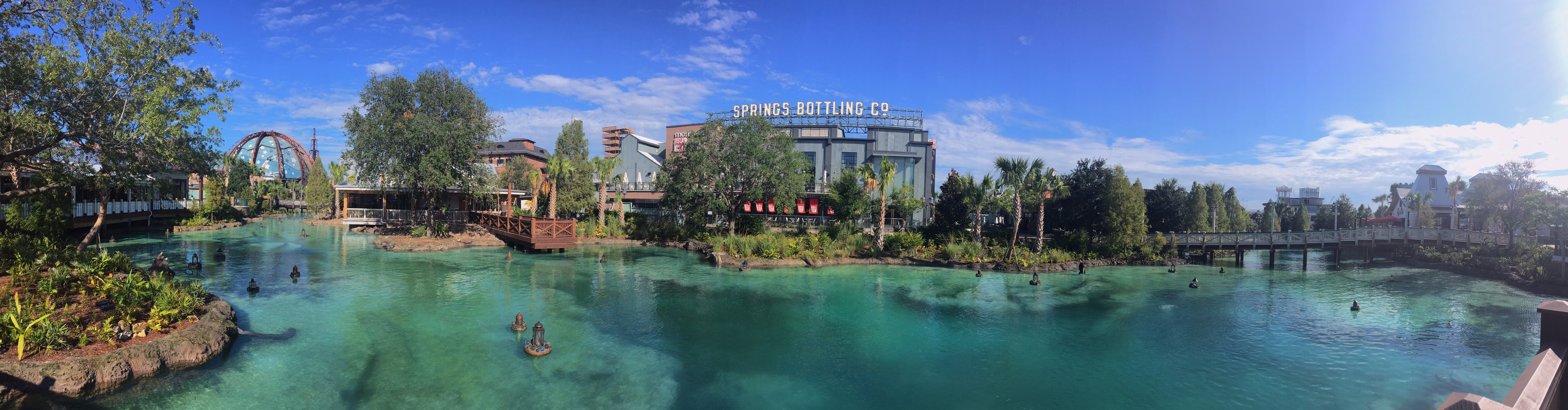
Panoramic view of the springs and the Landing from Town Center (June 2016)
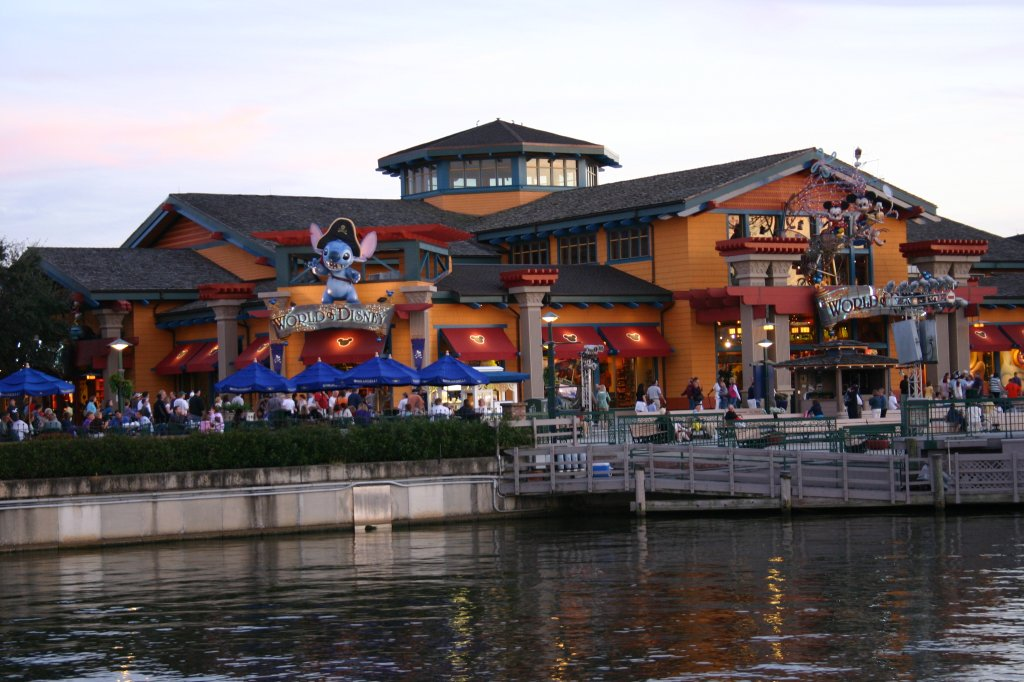
Marketplace (as pictured with the World of Disney in February 2008)

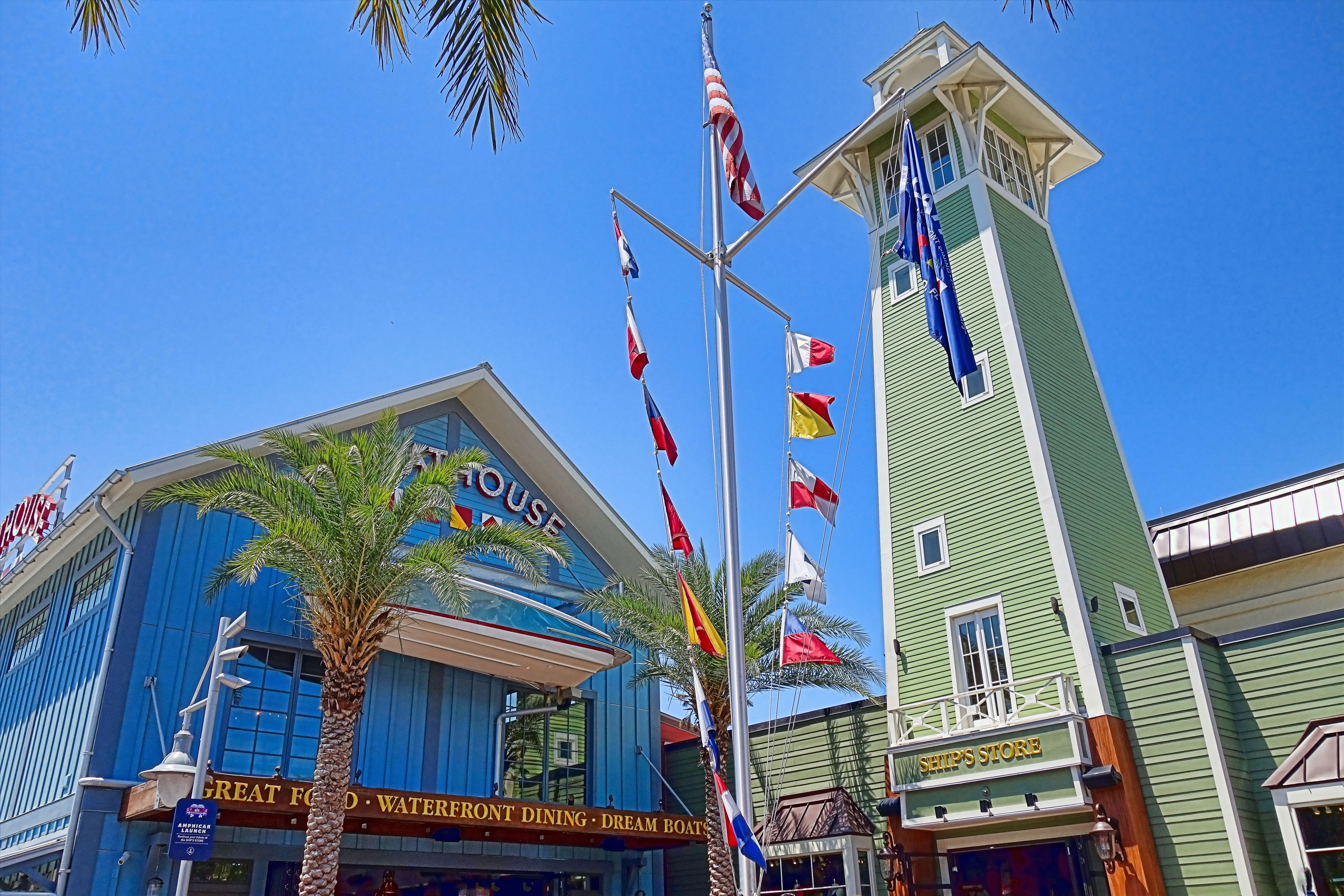
The Landing (May 2016)

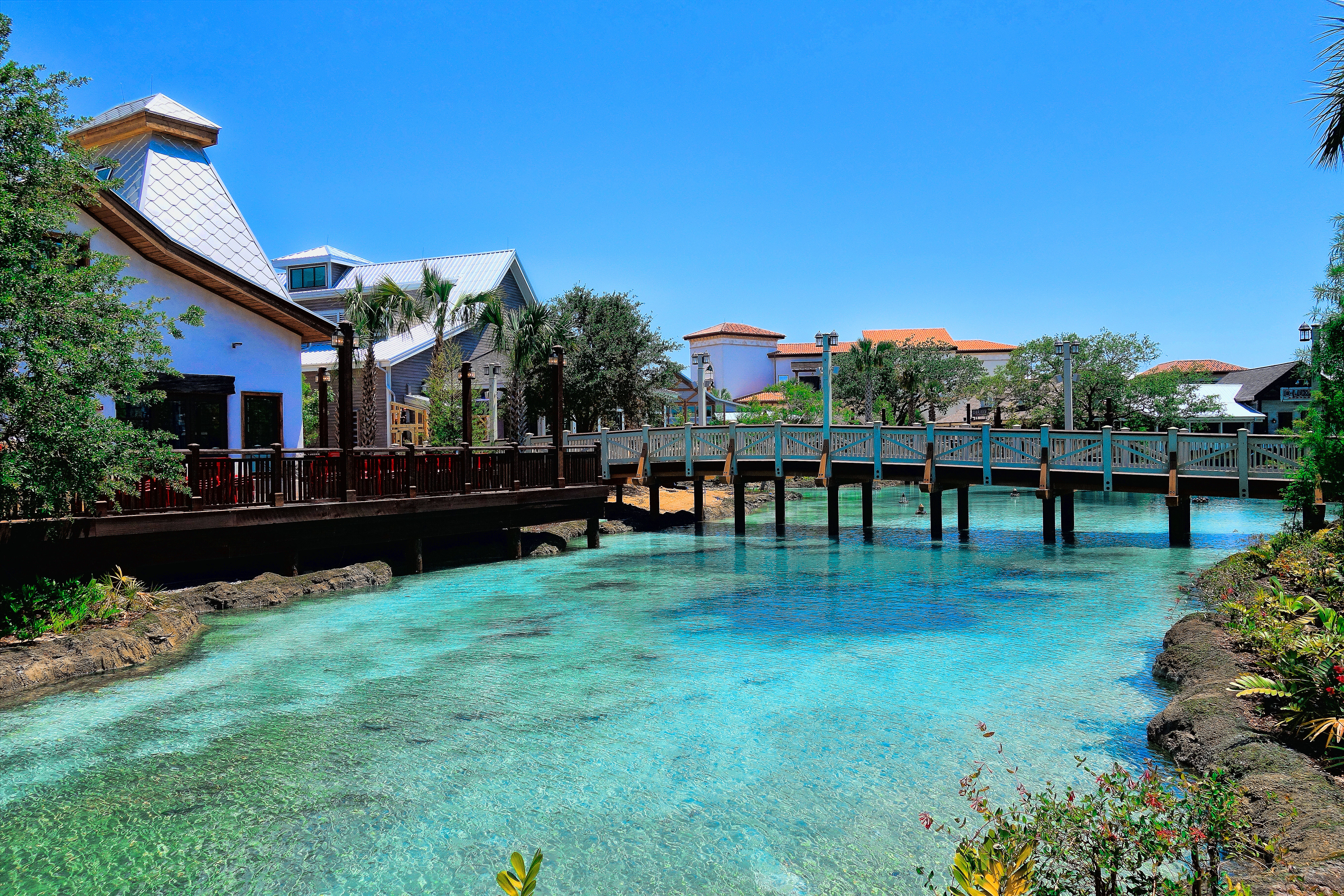
Town Center (May 2016)

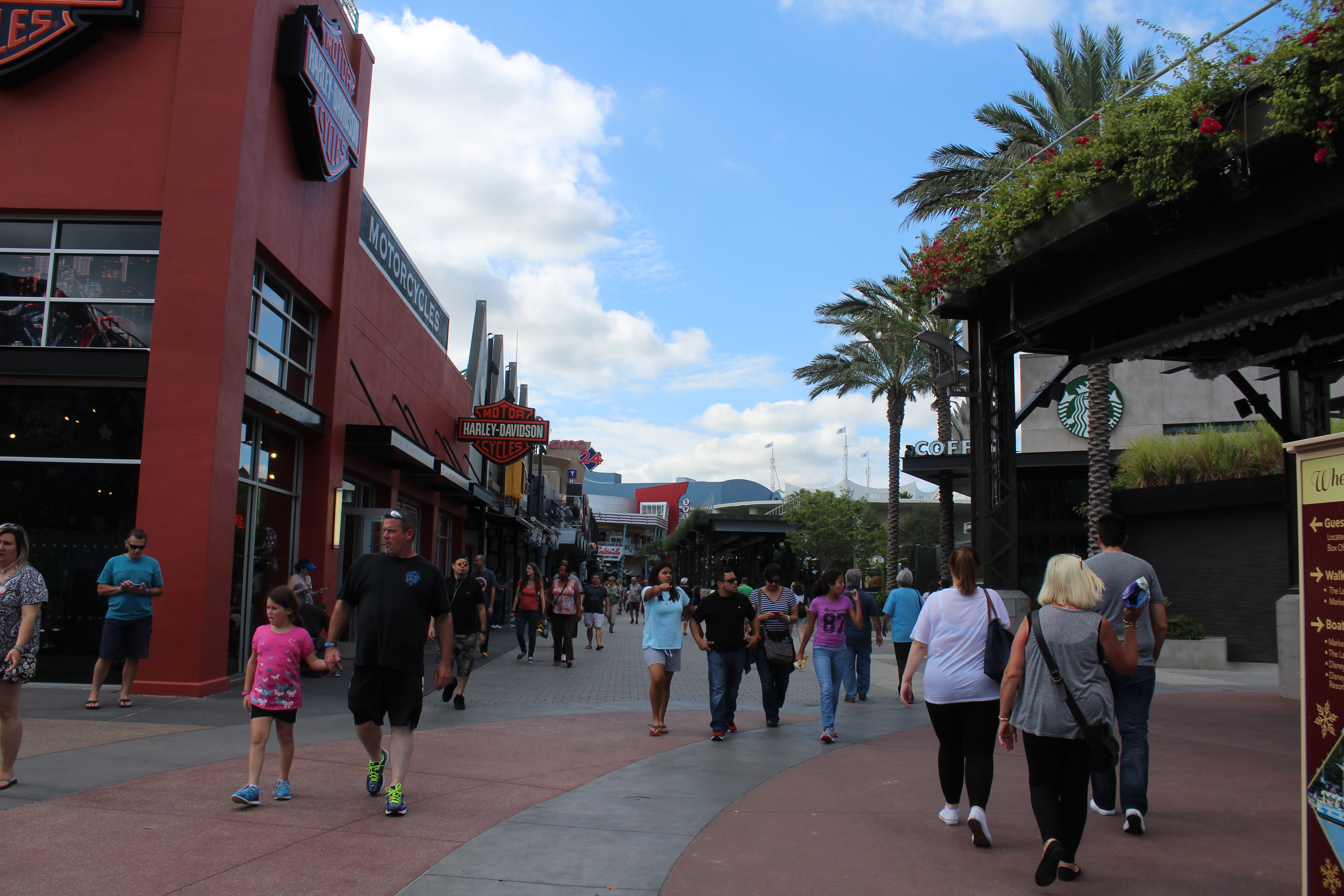
West Side (November 2015)

=== Marketplace ===
The first World of Disney store opened October 2, 1996, in the Marketplace area. In 1997, the Lego Imagination Center (now Lego Store) would open in Marketplace at Downtown Disney as Lego's second official retail store following the Mall of America location.

Marketplace houses many shops and restaurants reminiscent of the American Craftsman-style of the 1930s. The first restaurant in the Earl of Sandwich chain is located here. T-Rex Cafe is a dinosaur-themed restaurant operated by Landry's Restaurants, which features animatronic dinosaurs. It opened on October 14, 2008. Landry's Restaurants also operates Rainforest Cafe at this location. A walkway spanning the Village Lake and connecting Rainforest Cafe with the Lego Store—The Marketplace Causeway—was constructed and opened in 2015.

Unlike the other areas, the Marketplace also contains two traditional flat rides; the first one is a carousel located near the Earl of Sandwich, and the second one is located near the Village Lake. The Marketplace also contains a large Disney Experiences-owned World of Disney across from the AdventHealth Waterside Stage, which is on the lake. On December 4, 2023, eet by Maneet Chauhan debuted in the former Wolfgang Puck Express space, which closed in late 2020.

=== The Landing ===
The Landing depicts the fictional town's transportation hub and marina. The Landing features nautical-themed restaurants and shops, including Jock Lindsey's Hangar Bar—an aviation-themed dive bar based on the character from the Indiana Jones films—and The Boathouse, which serves as the port for the amphibious automobiles that offer cruises of Lake Buena Vista. The Amphicar is the amphibious vehicle used for the cruises. The area is also home to the Raglan Road Irish Pub and Restaurant.

The Art of Shaving in the Landing area would close permanently on January 2, 2024. Six Ravens, a concept created by Gideon's Bakehouse, would soft open in the former Art of Shaving space on August 3, 2026.

=== Town Center ===
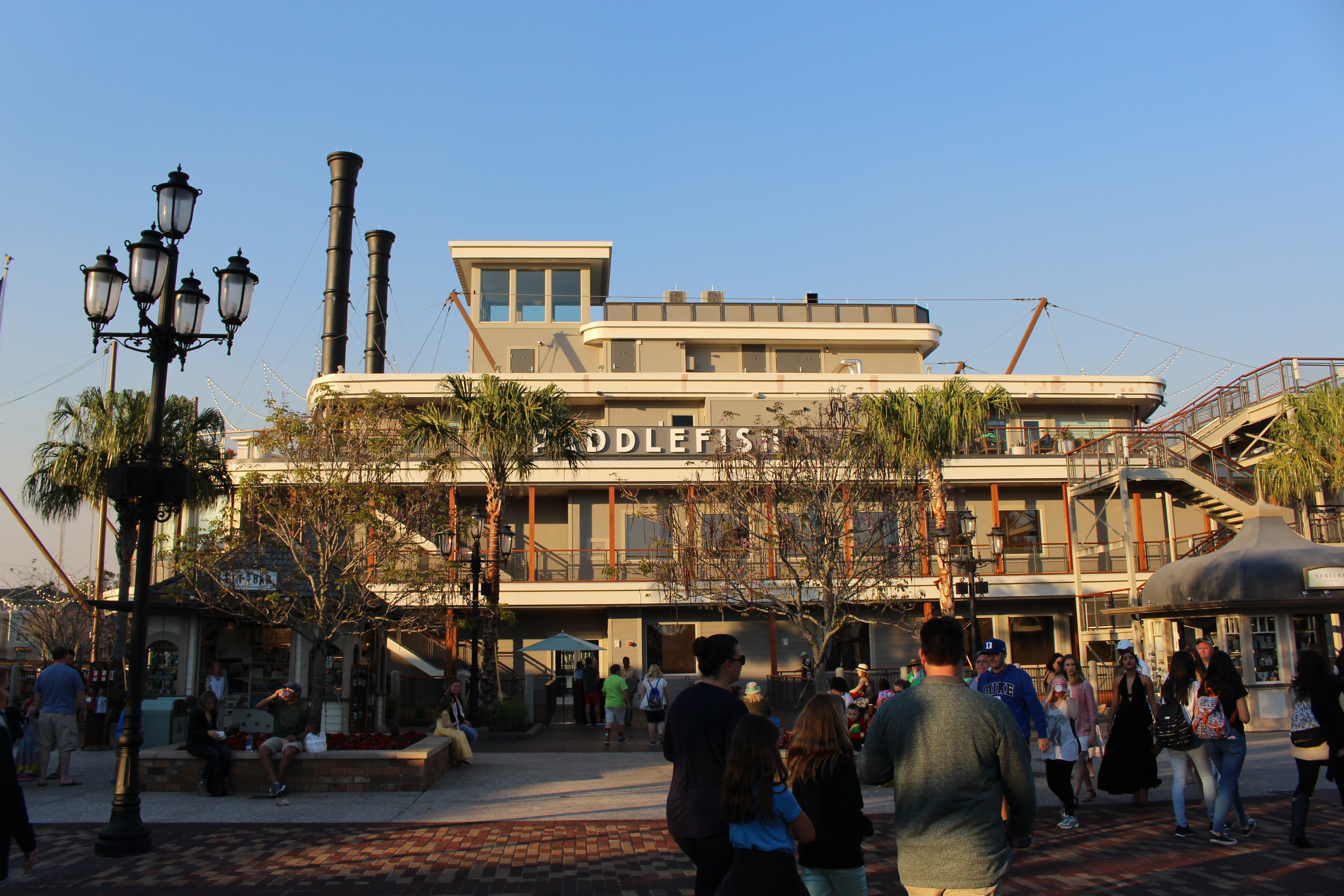
The former Empress Lilly, now the Paddlefish restaurant

Town Center depicts the fictional town's central business district, featuring Spanish Revival architecture from the 1920s. The Town Center area also features the namesake "springs", which are artificial.

The area debuted in 2016, having been built on former surface parking lots, and featured many well known retailers. The area would open in multiple phases, with the first phase having opened on May 15, 2017. Retailers to have opened in the first phase of Town Center include Anthropologie, Uniqlo (the first of its kind in the Southeastern United States), Sephora, L'Occitane en Provence, Pandora, UGG, Johnston & Murphy, Zara, Kate Spade New York, and Trophy Room among many others. The 250-seat Wolfgang Puck Bar & Grill opened in the Town Center area on November 19, 2018.

After filing for Chapter 11 bankruptcy, Francesca's closed permanently on March 29, 2026, followed by original Town Center tenant Shore on May 1, 2026, and Johnston & Murphy on May 7, 2026. Wolfgang Puck Bar & Grill would close permanently on September 13, 2026, while Cole Haan opened in the former Johnston & Murphy space on September 29, 2026.

=== West Side ===
Entrance to DisneyQuest (May 2009)

In early 2003, Fourty Thirst Street closed and was replaced by Wetzel's Pretzels. West Side depicts the town's exposition center, having been developed in the 1950s, according to the town's fictional history.

DisneyQuest was located in this area until it closed on July 2, 2017, and was subsequently demolished. Original West Side tenant Bongos Cuban Cafe would cease operations on August 18, 2019. The NBA Experience, which was built on the DisneyQuest site, briefly operated from August 12, 2019, until it closed in March 2020, due to the pandemic. On August 16, 2021, it was confirmed that the location would never reopen, rendering the closure permanent.

Summer House on the Lake debuted on December 14, 2023, replacing Bongos Cuban Cafe. On February 19, 2025, it was reported that Level99, an escape room attraction, would replace the NBA Experience, which opened on June 29, 2026 at Disney Springs West Side.

== Transportation ==
There are three parking garages at Disney Springs: the Orange Garage, the Lime Garage, and the Grapefruit Garage. There are also four surface parking lots: the Lemon Parking Lot, the Mango Parking Lot, the Strawberry Parking Lot, and the Watermelon Parking Lot. A direct exit exists from westbound I-4 to Disney Springs which is directly connected to the Orange Garage.

Disney Springs is served by Disney Transport buses, which serve all Disney resort hotels. There is no direct bus service from Disney Springs to Disney parks. A Brightline train station was planned to be built nearby, which would have provided service to Tampa, Orlando Airport, and Miami, however, on June 28, 2022, Disney announced that the station was canceled, and the train would not run on the Walt Disney World park property.

A direct bus service to Disney Parks is available from the Congress Park bus stop at Saratoga Springs (located near Rainforest Cafe in Disney Springs) and bus service is available from Disney Springs to the Contemporary Resort (near Magic Kingdom) and the Boardwalk, Beach Club and Yacht Club resorts (near Epcot and Disney's Hollywood Studios). Additionally, Lynx serves Disney Springs, with bus routes 300, 301, 302, 303, 304, 306, 307, 311, and 350, that depart from the bus terminal on the west side of the complex adjacent to the Watermelon Parking Lot. Ferry service is provided within Disney Springs and from Disney Springs to the Saratoga Springs, Old Key West, and Port Orleans resorts.

== Gallery ==
AMC Dine-In Disney Springs 24 (March 2017)

Fulton's Crab House (March 2012)

Level99 at night (September 2026)

Interior of Uniqlo (April 2025)

West Side (May 2009)

Planet Hollywood globe and fountain (March 2012)

== See also ==
- List of incidents at Walt Disney World#Disney Springs
- Universal CityWalk Orlando
- Disney Village
- Ikspiari
- Disneytown
