= Shanghai Disneyland (disambiguation) =

Shanghai Disneyland may refer to:

- Shanghai Disney Resort, the resort located in Pudong, Shanghai which includes Shanghai Disneyland, 2 hotels and an entertainment district
- Shanghai Disneyland Park, a theme park in Pudong, Shanghai

== See also ==
- Walt Disney Parks and Resorts
