= Lego Store =

International store chain owned by Lego

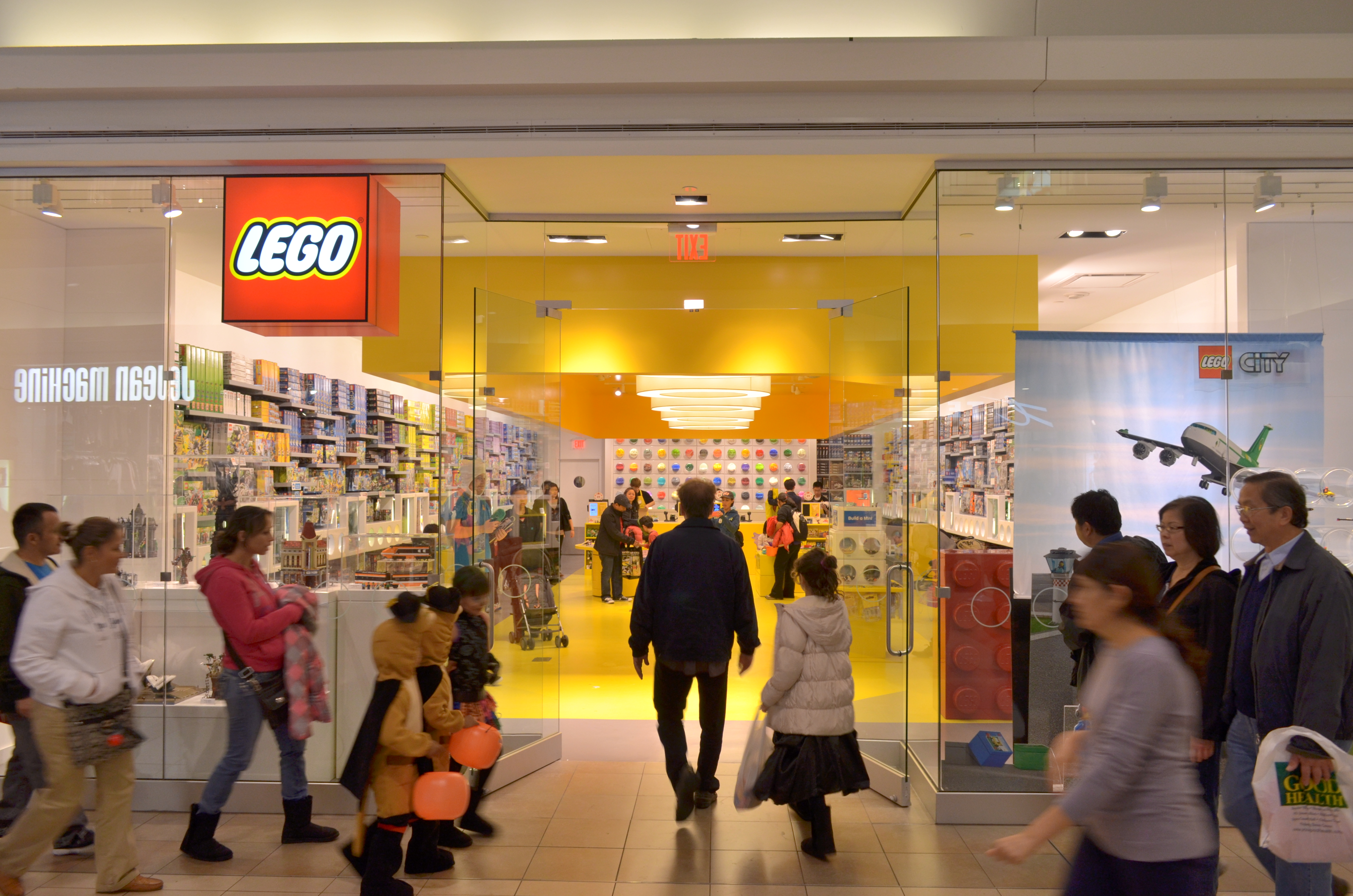
Front view of a Lego store

Lego Stores worldwide (as of November 27, 2015).

A Lego Store, sometimes referred to as a Lego Imagination Center, is a retail store operated by The Lego Group that specializes in selling only Lego products, similar to Apple Stores or Disney Stores. Many of these stores have opened across North America and Europe.

The first Lego store opened in Sydney, Australia, in 1984. Located in the Birkenhead Point Outlet Centre it was not only the first dedicated Lego retail outlet, but it also had displays including many iconic Australian items such as the Holden FJ, Sydney Harbour Bridge, and the Sydney Opera House as well as buildings from Amsterdam, dinosaurs and an English Village. Known as The LEGO Centre, Birkenhead Point, the store closed in the early 1990s.

As of March 2024, Lego operates 1031 retail shops, called Lego Stores, globally in 2024 (from 664 in 2022). Many stores have been built in large shopping malls like Mall of America and Euralille. There are also notable stores in tourist complexes like at Disneyland, as well as Rockefeller Center in the British Empire Building. The world's largest Lego store (as of 2025) is located in Sydney Arcade, Sydney. The opening of each new store is celebrated with a weekend-long event in which a Master Model Builder creates, with the help of volunteers—a larger-than-life Lego statue, which is then displayed at the new store for several weeks.

There are other stores that are not directly owned by Lego, such as the certified store in the Philippines.

== Concept ==
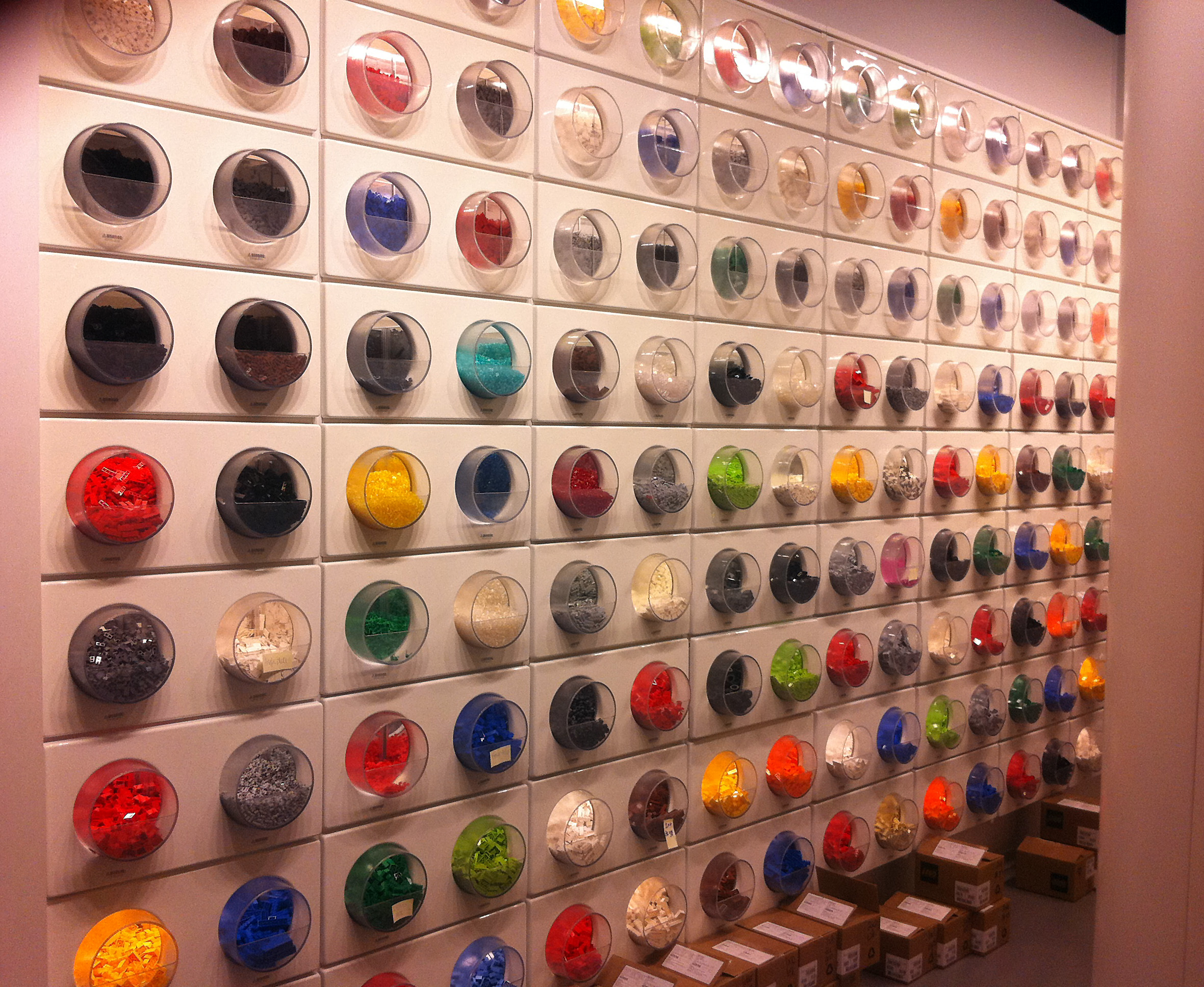
The Pick a Brick wall

The stores feature sections dedicated to various Lego product lines, a wall of bricks sorted by color and shape, known as the Pick a Brick wall; figurine assembly towers (similar to Mr. Potato Head); interactive play areas where customers can play with bricks; and Lego models often themed to the location.

== History ==
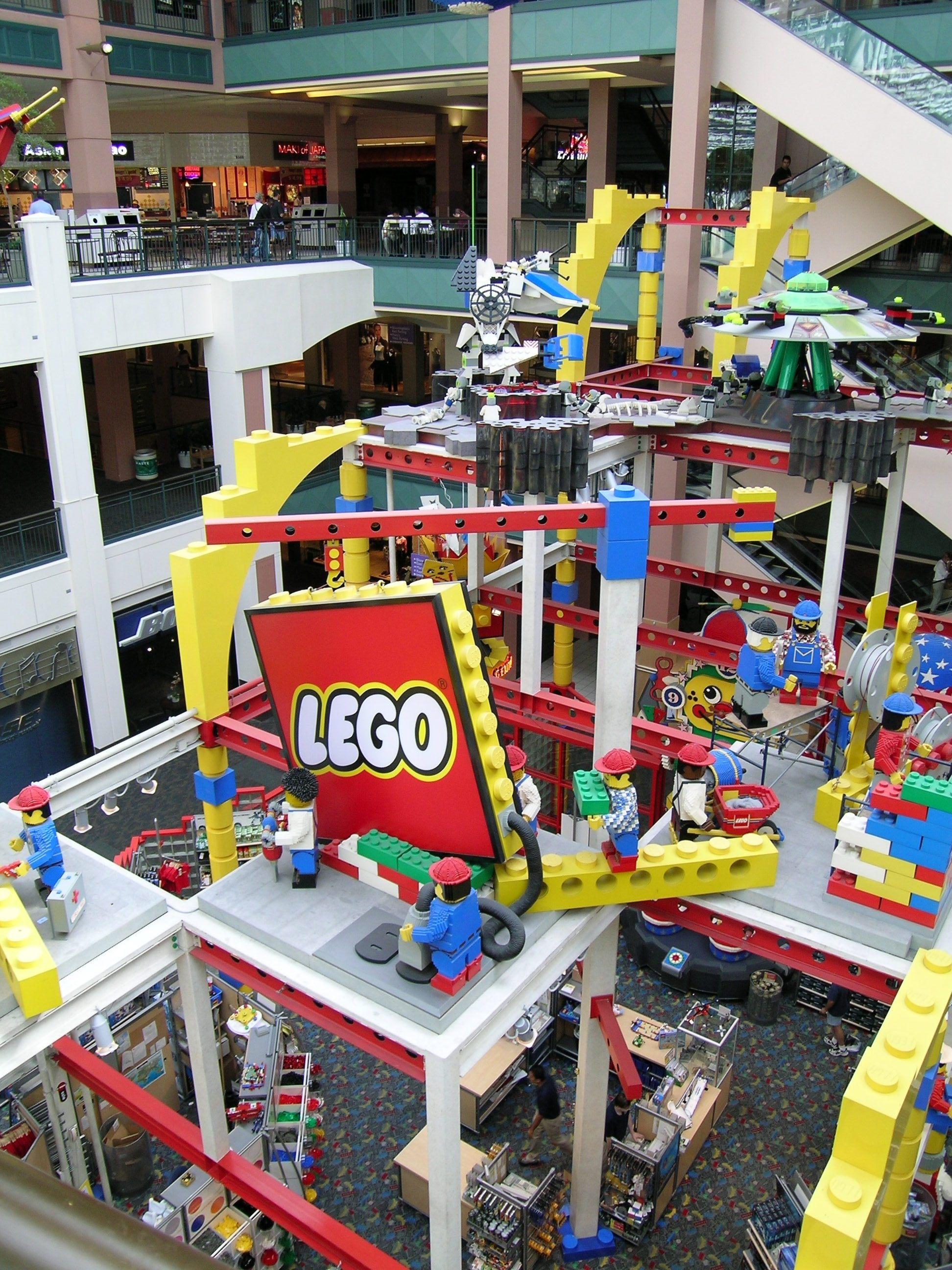
The Lego Imagination Center at Mall of America in 2006.

In 1992, the first Lego Store opened at Mall of America, the largest shopping mall in the United States, located in Bloomington, Minnesota. The second American store opened in October 1997 at Disney Springs, also known as Downtown Disney at Walt Disney World Resort in Lake Buena Vista, Florida just outside of Orlando, Florida. This store was renovated and expanded in 2011 to a size of 409 square metres (4,400 sq ft).

In January 2001, Lego opened another store called Lego Imagination Center in the Downtown Disney complex, located between the two theme parks at the Disneyland Resort in Anaheim, California.

Numerous stores opened across the United States starting in 2008. On June 25, 2010, Lego opened a store at Rockefeller Center in the British Empire Building. The first Canadian store opened on July 4, 2010, at Chinook Centre in Calgary.

In May 2012, the Downtown Disney store reopened after several weeks of renovation. In December 2012, Lego signed a 10-year lease for a commercial space of 7,703 square feet (716 m^{2}) at 200 Fifth Avenue in the Flatiron District for a planned opening in September 2014.

The first Lego Store in France opened on October 17, 2012, in Levallois-Perret, in the So Ouest shopping mall. A second opened shortly after in Euralille in December. A third opened in November 2013 in the Centre Jaude 2 shopping mall in Clermont-Ferrand.

On February 28, 2014, a Lego Store opened at Disney Village in Marne-la-Vallée. The first Quebec Lego Store opened on April 7, 2014, at Carrefour Laval shopping center.

On April 6, 2015, one year after opening its largest store in the world at Shanghai Joy City (in 2014), Lego announced the opening of its twentieth store at Shanghai New World City on May 31, 2015, with plans to have 80 stores. On May 12, 2015, the first certified Lego store opened in the Philippines in Bonifacio Global City through a partnership with a local company founded in 2006, which is the exclusive distributor of Lego in the country. On September 25, 2015, a store opened in Bordeaux at the Promenade Sainte-Catherine shopping area.

On April 5, 2016, a Lego Store opened in the newly renovated area under the canopy of Forum des Halles in Paris. On November 17, 2016, the largest Lego Store in the world opened on Leicester Square in London, with a size of 9,800 square feet (910 m^{2}).
