= Downtown Disney =

Shopping center at Disneyland Resort

Downtown Disney District

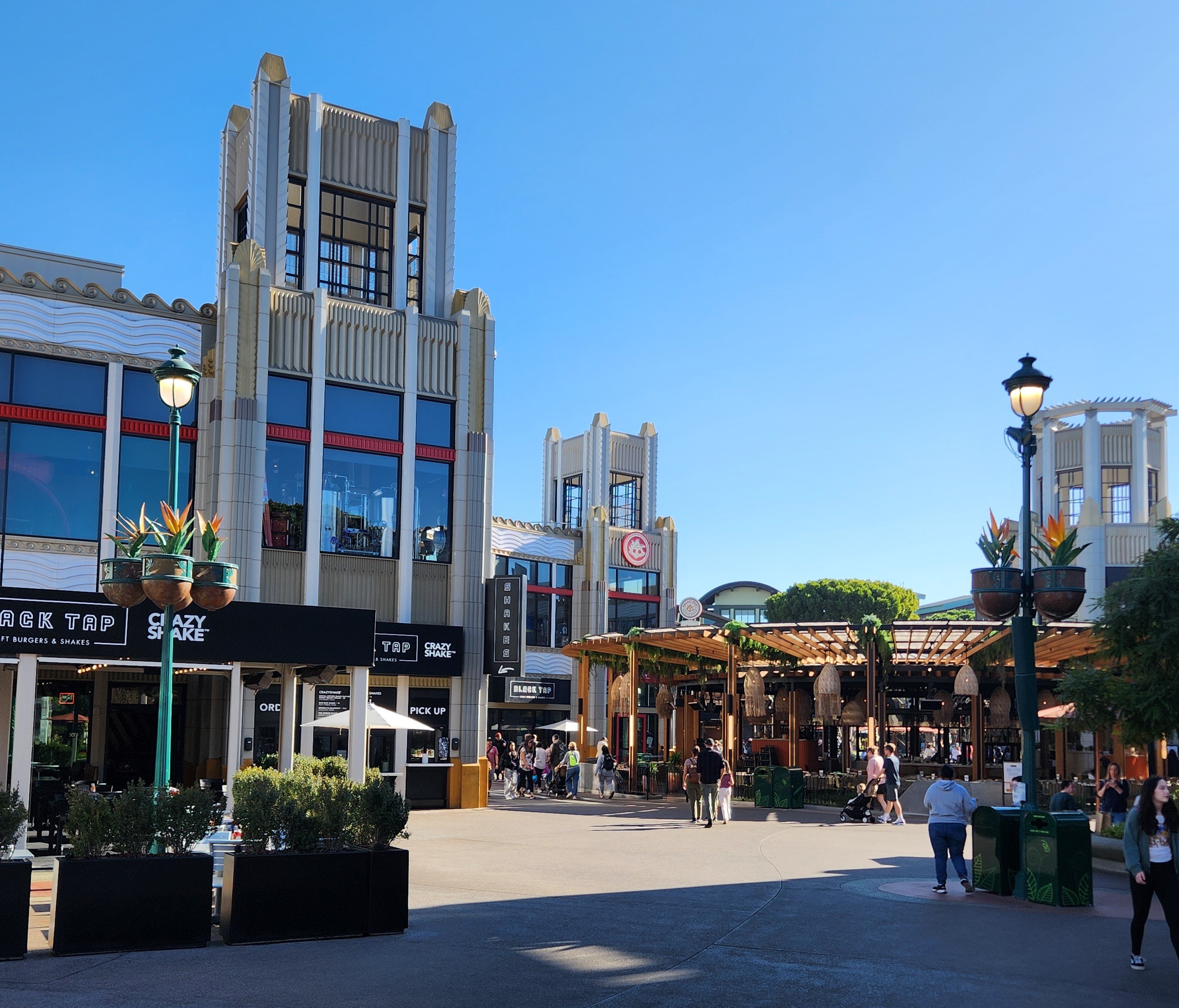
- Exterior view (January 2025)
- Location: Disneyland Resort; Anaheim, California, U.S.
- Coordinates: 33.809052°N 117.924027°W
- Address: 1580 Disneyland Drive, 92802
- Opened: January 12, 2001; 25 years ago
- Developer: The Walt Disney Company
- Manager: Disney Experiences
- Owner: Disney Experiences
- Architect: Elkus Manfredi Architects; Walt Disney Imagineering
- Num. of stores: 25 to 30+ (at peak)
- Floor area: Over 300,000 sq ft (28,000 m^{2}) or 20 acres (8.1 ha)
- Floors: 1 to 2
- Website: Official website

Downtown Disney, officially the Downtown Disney District, is an outdoor shopping center located at the Disneyland Resort in Anaheim, California. It opened on January 12, 2001 as part of a major expansion of the resort that also included Disney California Adventure and Disney's Grand Californian Hotel & Spa.

The district is similar in concept to Disney Springs at Walt Disney World in Florida.

== Overview ==
Former logo (2001–2026)

Downtown Disney connects the two Disneyland Resort theme parks with the resort's three hotels, extending from the esplanade between the theme parks towards the Disneyland Hotel. A pedestrian bridge crosses Disneyland Drive, providing access to the Disneyland Hotel and Pixar Place Hotel. A station for the Disneyland Monorail System sits adjacent to the pedestrian bridge.

The district features a variety of shops, restaurants, and entertainment venues, including national retailers, Disney-operated businesses, live music, and bowling. One of its largest stores is the World of Disney store, which is built into the ground floor of Disney's Grand Californian Hotel & Spa. Downtown Disney is open to the public without requiring theme park admission or a stay at a Disneyland Resort hotel.

== History ==
=== Late 1990s – 2001: Development and opening ===
Downtown Disney District at night, as viewed from the Grand Californian Hotel (October 2005)

Unlike Walt Disney World in Florida, Disneyland was surrounded by existing development, limiting options for expansion. In the 1990s, Disney developed plans to transform Disneyland into a larger resort destination, which would include a second theme park, an additional hotel, and a shopping, dining and entertainment district. The district was modeled after Downtown Disney at Disney World, but on a much smaller scale.

Disneyland's original parking lot closed on January 21, 1998, to make room for Downtown Disney, Disney's Grand Californian Hotel & Spa, and Disney California Adventure. To replace the lost parking spaces, Disney constructed the seven-story, 10,250-space Mickey & Friends parking structure, which opened on July 24, 2000.

The Downtown Disney District opened on January 12, 2001. On the night of January 11, 2001, Disney held a star-studded preview gala for the Downtown Disney District. CEO Michael Eisner, President Bob Iger, and Walt Disney Parks and Resorts Chairman Paul Pressler delivered the dedication spaces to officially open the 20-acre (8.1 ha) shopping and entertainment complex to the public. Architecturally, Downtown Disney blended Art Deco, Craftsman, and Prairie styles, designed to match the theme of the adjacent Disney's Grand Californian Hotel & Spa and Disney California Adventure, which opened on January 2, 2001, and February 8, 2001, respectively.

Downtown Disney launched with 28 tenants, which included World of Disney, House of Blues, Rainforest Cafe, La Brea Bakery, the Lego Store, ESPN Zone, Disney's Pin Traders, and a 12-screen, 60,000 sq ft (5,600 m^{2}) AMC Theatres megaplex.

=== 2002–2012: Early years ===
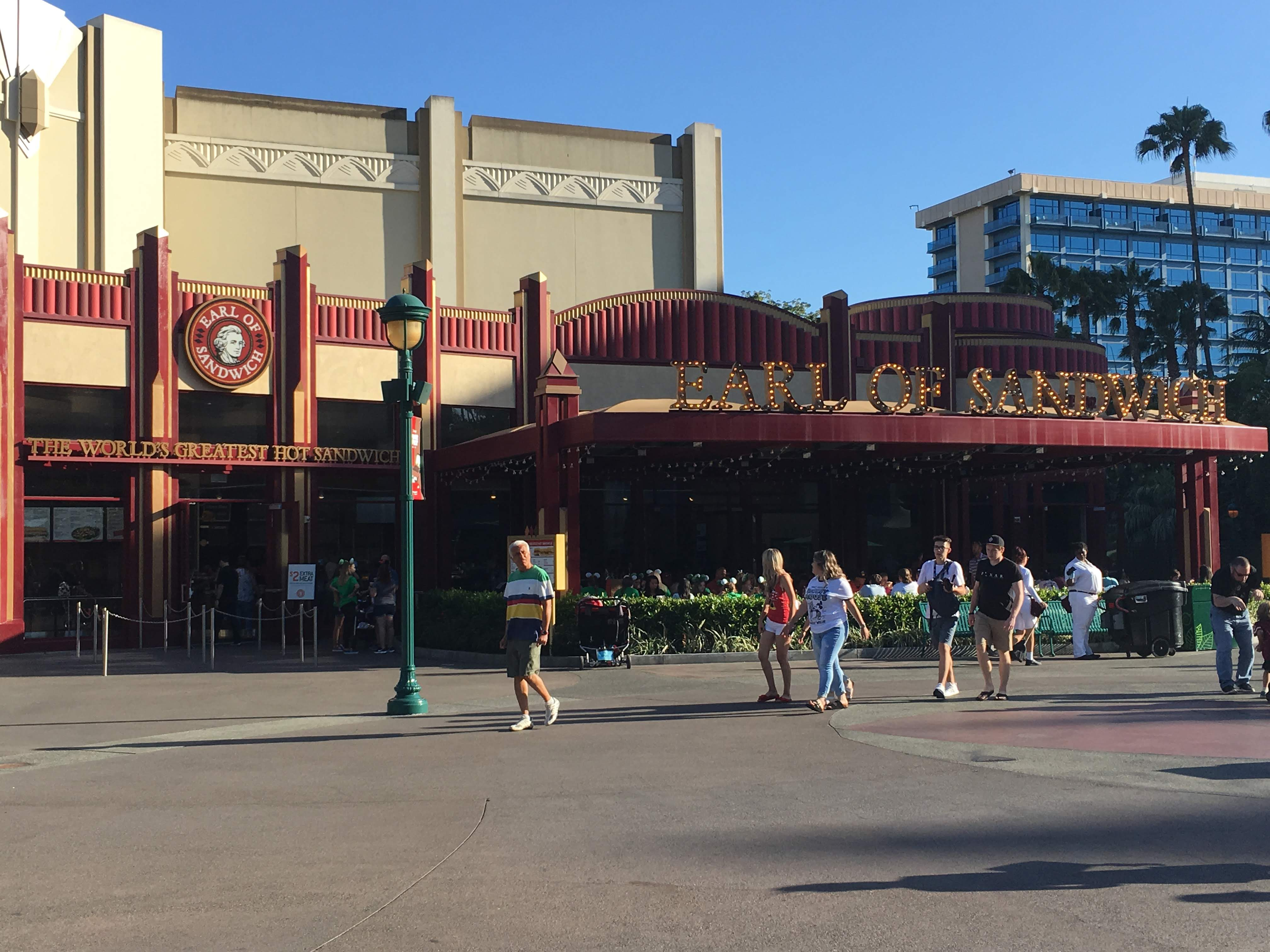
Earl of Sandwich (June 2018)

Y Arriba! Y Arriba! closed in June 2002, as the Latin dining and entertainment venue failed to capture a large enough audience. Jamba Juice debuted in 2003, and Tortilla Jo's opened in the former Y Arriba! space in April 2004. Disney Vault 28 soft opened on October 11, 2006, followed by a grand opening on November 12, 2006. Studio Disney 365 opened on June 26, 2009, as a salon experience targeted at children looking for Disney Channel-inspired makeovers.

D Street opened on December 15, 2009, replacing the Illuminations home fragrance and candle store. Ridemakerz opened in October 2009, and reopened on June 16, 2010, following an expansion. The Basin bath and beauty store closed in late January 2011. In June 2011, Sanuk opened as a permanent location; it operated as a temporary pop-up run from November 2009 to March 2010.

Compass Books & Café would close on March 31, 2012, alongside a nearby kiosk. The bookstore and cafe combo shuttered, as Books Inc. (Note: Parent of Compass Books & Café) president Michael Tucker explained Disney had a "new vision" for Downtown Disney's tenant mix, asking them to stay for additional months after their original lease expired in January 2012. On June 9, 2012, the WonderGround Gallery opened in the former space of Island Charters.

Earl of Sandwich took over the former Compass Books & Café space and opened on November 2, 2012.

=== 2014–2019: Tenant changes ===
Starbucks Coffee (June 2014)

A Disney-inspired Starbucks opened at the complex on March 10, 2014. Anna & Elsa's Boutique opened in the former Studio Disney 365 space on October 6, 2014; Studio Disney 365 shuttered on September 22, 2014.

On May 1, 2016, Chapel Hats debuted in the former space of the Little Miss Matched store. House of Blues would close permanently on May 31, 2016, relocating to the nearby Anaheim GardenWalk. Quiksilver, which emerged from bankruptcy, closed its store at the mall in July 2016; the space was split and replaced by Pandora and Curl Surf. In mid-September 2016, Disney announced that the former House of Blues building would be razed.

==== Fourth hotel cancellation ====
In October 2017, plans were announced for a fourth resort hotel at the property. Situated in front of the Disneyland Hotel, the new hotel would displace much of the westernmost portion of Downtown Disney, and would have featured 700 rooms. The cost of construction for the hotel would have been offset by up to $267 million in tax rebates over 20 years, allowing the resort to keep a percentage of the transient occupancy tax levied on Anaheim hotels.

Disney Home Shop opened on February 14, 2018, replacing D Street. A two-story Splitsville Luxury Lanes opened on the former site of House of Blues on March 15, 2018, featuring 40,000 sq ft (3,700 m^{2}).

AMC Downtown Disney 12 (July 2016)

To make room for the hotel, several Downtown Disney tenants were evicted by Disney or had their lease renewals declined in 2018; in March of that year, it was announced that AMC Theatres would close in June, and the movie theater itself would be demolished in July. This was followed by Rainforest Cafe, ESPN Zone, Earl of Sandwich, Alamo Rent-A-Car, Build-A-Bear Workshop, and the West End Starbucks.

Weeks after the closures took place, growing tensions between Disney and the City of Anaheim over the subsidy and the hotel's location led to the project being put on hold. Days after the announcement that the project was postponed, Disneyland requested that the tax subsidies be rescinded. The Anaheim City Council voted to rescind the tax subsidies days later. After weeks of inactivity at the hotel's proposed site, Disney announced in October 2018 that the fourth hotel project had been canceled. Around that month, Salt & Straw Ice Cream debuted its first Orange County location, Earl of Sandwich and Starbucks reopened, and World of Disney also reopened on October 26 following a multi-month revamp. Prior to 2017, Downtown Disney featured as many as 30 shops.

Ballast Point Brewing Company opened its first Anaheim location on January 16, 2019, at Downtown Disney. Black Tap Craft Burgers & Shakes debuted its first location in California at the mall on April 27, 2019. In July 2019, parking for the mall was relocated to south of Disney's Paradise Pier Hotel (Note: Now Pixar Place Hotel as of 2024.) at the Simba parking lot. In addition, a pedestrian bridge linking the Pixar Pals and Mickey & Friends parking structures to the shopping district opened on September 13, 2019.

=== 2020–present: West End redevelopment ===
Star Wars Trading Post (July 2026)

On March 14, 2020, Disney Parks temporarily closed the Disneyland Resort, including Downtown Disney, in response to the COVID-19 pandemic. The mall reopened on July 9, 2020, with enhanced social distancing measures. From November 19, 2020, to March 14, 2021, the resort expanded the district temporarily into Buena Vista Street at the then-closed Disney California Adventure.

After several years of vacancy, Disney announced that the former Rainforest Cafe location would become Star Wars Trading Post, a retail location selling Star Wars: Galaxy's Edge merchandise, which opened on February 19, 2021. The former ESPN Zone building remained vacant. In November 2021, Disney announced a reimagining of the West End of Downtown Disney with new shopping, dining, and entertainment experiences. Construction began with the demolition of AMC Theatres, Starbucks, and Earl of Sandwich beginning in January 2022. On April 27, 2022, Din Tai Fung was announced to be the anchor for the expansion. The announcement also came with a reimagining of UVA Bar and Catal into separate restaurants named Centrico and Paseo, as well as a mid-century modern design for the district's new west end. In addition, a Porto's Bakery location has been announced for Downtown Disney.

In April 2025, it was announced that Lululemon would be added to a section of the former ESPN Zone building. In June 2025, it was announced that Earl of Sandwich would close again, this time, in its temporary building that previously housed La Brea Bakery, to make way for a new Porto's Bakery. A new Earl of Sandwich opened on June 26, 2026, with grand opening festivities happening on July 15, 2026. Gordon Ramsay at The Carnaby would open on the night of July 13, 2026.

== Gallery ==
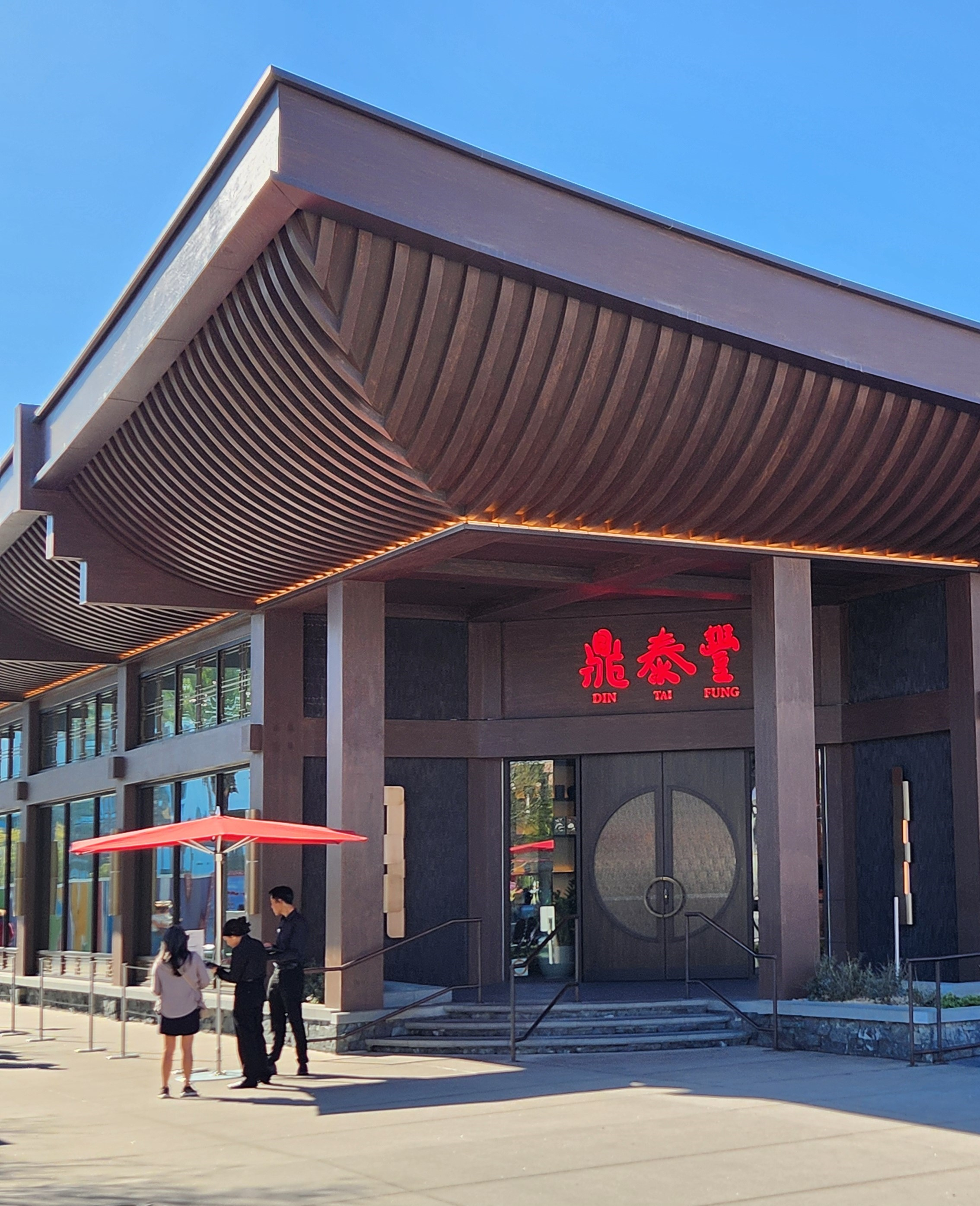
Din Tai Fung (January 2025)

Entrance to Splitsville at night (June 2018)

Jamba Juice entrance (June 2018)

Tortilla Jo's (July 2014)

== See also ==
- Disney Village
- Disneytown
- Ikspiari
- Universal CityWalk Hollywood
