= Earl of Sandwich (restaurant) =

American restaurant franchise

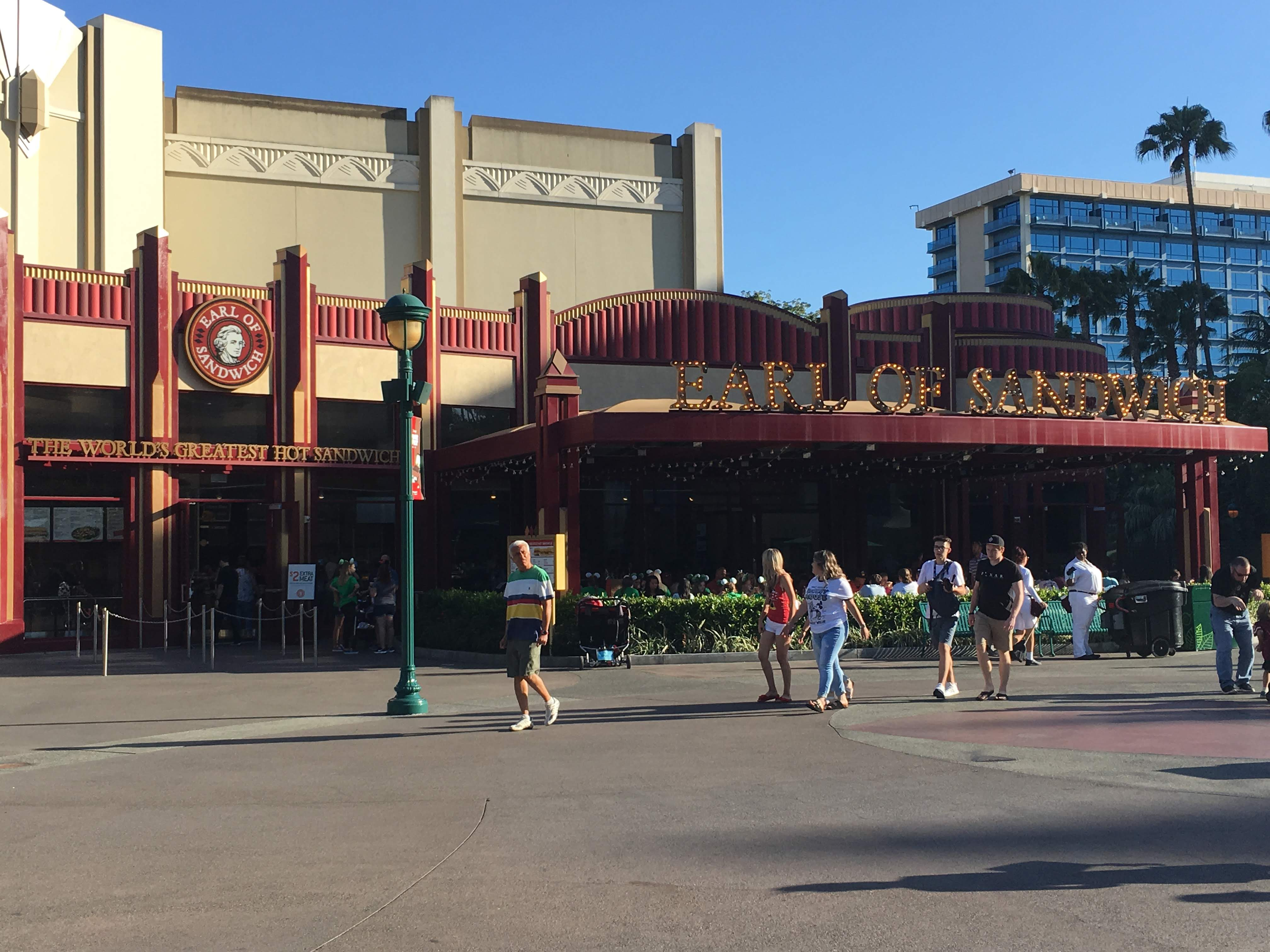
- Earl of Sandwich at Downtown Disney in Anaheim, California
- Type: Private
- Industry: Fast food restaurants Franchising
- Founded: 2004; 22 years ago
- Headquarters: Orlando, Florida, U.S.
- Number of locations: 38 (34 in the US)
- Key people: Lord Sandwich, Orlando Montagu, Robert Earl
- Products: Submarine sandwiches, salads, other food products
- Website: www.earlofsandwichusa.com

Earl of Sandwich is a restaurant franchise based in Orlando, Florida, United States. It was founded by the 11th Earl of Sandwich; his younger son, the Hon. Orlando Montagu; and businessman Robert Earl, founder of Planet Hollywood.

== History ==
Earl of Sandwich is the brainchild of Orlando Montagu, the younger son of the 11th Earl of Sandwich. He and his father are direct descendants of the 4th Earl who popularised the sandwich in Great Britain and Ireland in the 18th century.

The first restaurant was opened on March 19, 2004, located in Downtown Disney (now known as Disney Springs) on the property of the Walt Disney World Resort outside of Orlando, Florida. Earl of Sandwich has franchising plans in the United States and the United Kingdom, including the Planet Hollywood Resort and Casino in Las Vegas, Nevada.

The first Earl of Sandwich franchise opened in Sugar Land, Texas, and is owned by an investment group which includes Nolan Ryan and Roger Clemens. Additional locations have opened since, in various states across the U.S. The first Earl of Sandwich restaurant outside of the United States opened on April 18, 2011, in London, but closed on February 28, 2014. The chain has since expanded to the Disney Village at Disneyland Paris, in addition to locations in Langley, Kelowna, Calgary, Edmonton, and Winnipeg in Canada and five in the Philippines.
