= Disneytown =

Coordinates: 31.1420°N 121.6578°E

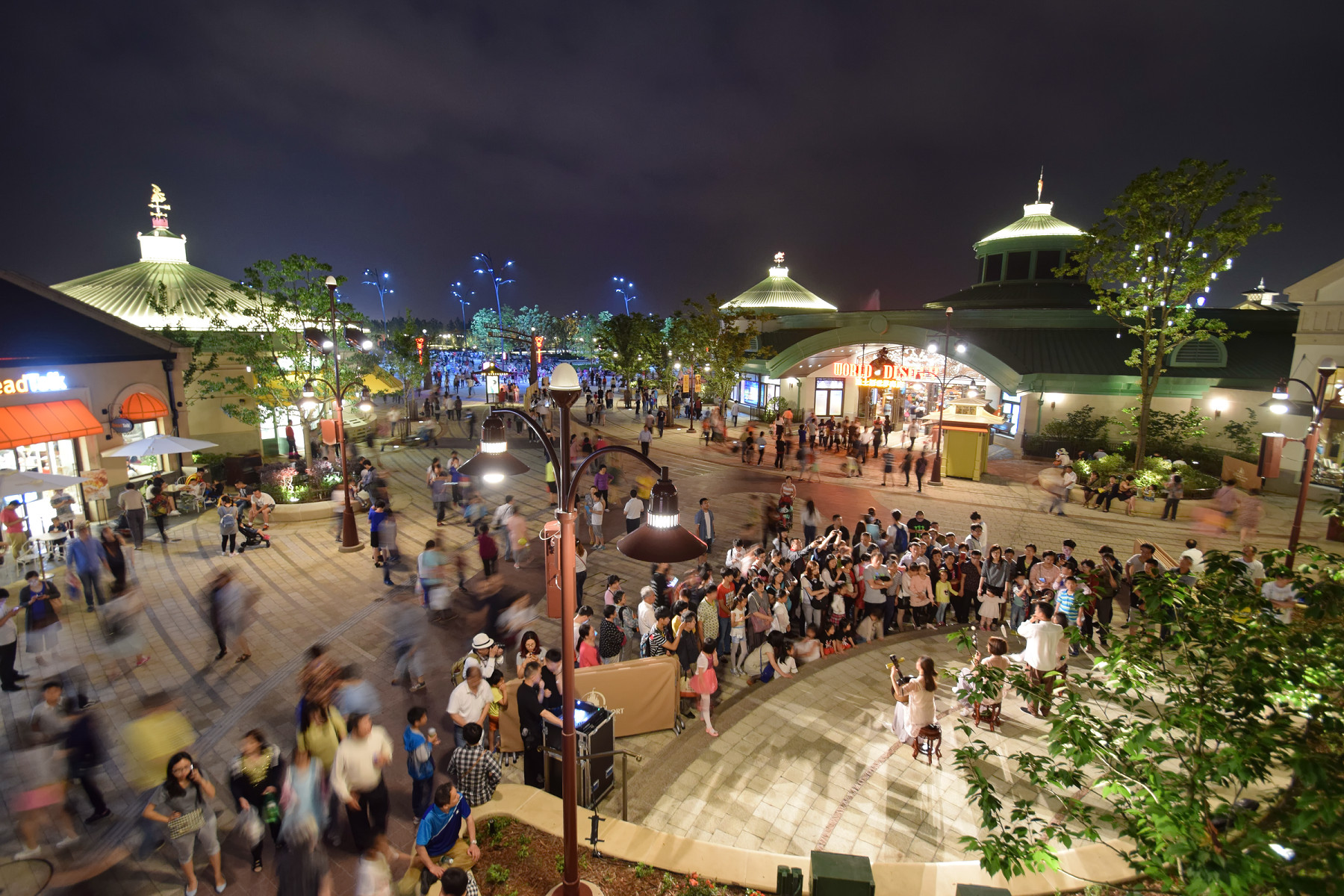
- Location: Shanghai Disney Resort, Shanghai, China
- Opened: June 16, 2016
- Manager: Shanghai International Theme Park and Resort Management Company Limited
- Owner: The Walt Disney Company and Shanghai Shendi Group

Disneytown is a shopping, dining, and entertainment complex at the Shanghai Disney Resort in Pudong, Shanghai, China. It is the Shanghai equivalent of other Disney Parks' major shopping centers, such as Downtown Disney.

Disneytown is located between the Disneyland park and the hotels on the property. It consists of five districts: Broadway Plaza, Broadway Boulevard, Spice Alley, Marketplace and Lakeshore.

Disneytown has a 3,000-square-meter World of Disney Store. The store is inspired by a railroad roundhouse and offers thousands of products for sale inspired by and made exclusively for the Shanghai Disney Resort. It includes clothing, accessories, souvenirs, toys, collectibles, costumes, luggage, and pre-packaged food. It also specializes in personalized products and products specially made for collaboration with local artisans.

== Closed experiences ==
When Disneytown opened in 2016, there was focus on two major attractions for the shopping center. Alongside the World of Disney Store, there was also a production of The Lion King musical for the first time in Mandarin Chinese at the Walt Disney Grand Theatre. This show was a separate ticketed event, and featured a brand-new character, a "mischievous monkey," as described by the musical's director Julie Taymor, for the Chinese year of the monkey. After a run of five years, playing not only The Lion King, but also Beauty and the Beast, the theatre was repurposed as an attraction to be accessed inside the Shanghai Disneyland park. The Broadway-style musicals were replaced by Mickey's Storybook Adventure, a new production running 28 minutes, which featured a revue of songs from Disney's The Jungle Book, Moana, Mulan, Tangled, Zootopia, The Princess and the Frog, and Frozen.

== See also ==
- Downtown Disney (Disneyland Resort in California)
- Disney Springs (Walt Disney World in Florida)
- Ikspiari (Tokyo Disney Resort in Japan)
- Disney Village (Disneyland Paris in France)
