= Shanghai Disneyland Hotel =

Hotel in Shanghai, China

Coordinates: 31.1374078°N 121.6616804°E

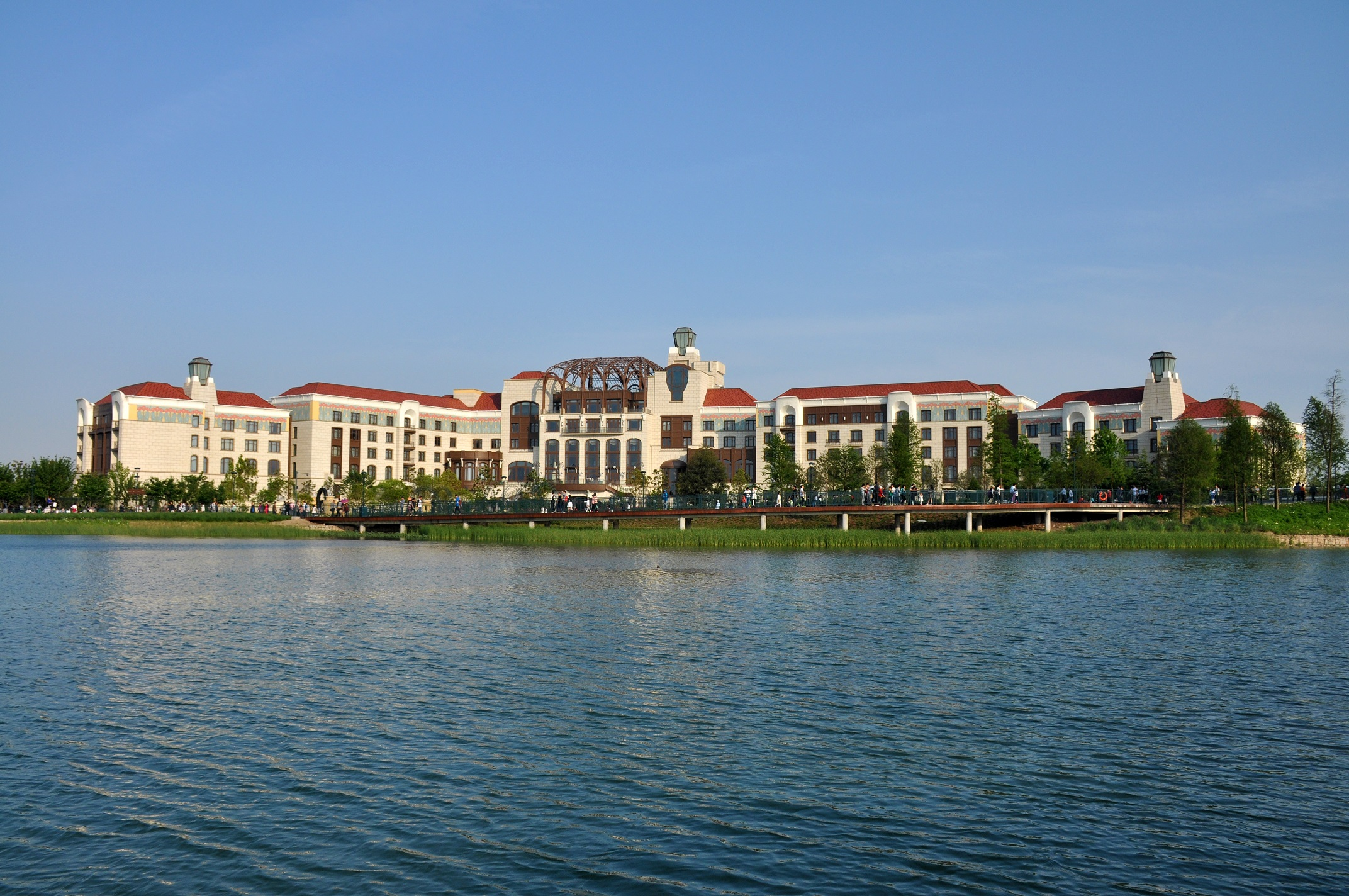
- Interactive map of the Shanghai Disneyland Hotel area

General information
- Type: Resort
- Location: Shanghai Disney Resort
- Opened: June 16, 2016

Other information
- Number of rooms: 420

Website
- Official website

Shanghai Disneyland Hotel is one of two hotels located within Shanghai Disney Resort. The hotel is in the Art Nouveau style, with Disney theming. The hotel is located across Wishing Star Lake from Shanghai Disneyland.

== Dining ==
The hotel includes multiple restaurants, including Lumiere's Kitchen (based on Disney's Beauty and the Beast franchise), Ballet Café, Bacchus Lounge, and Aurora.

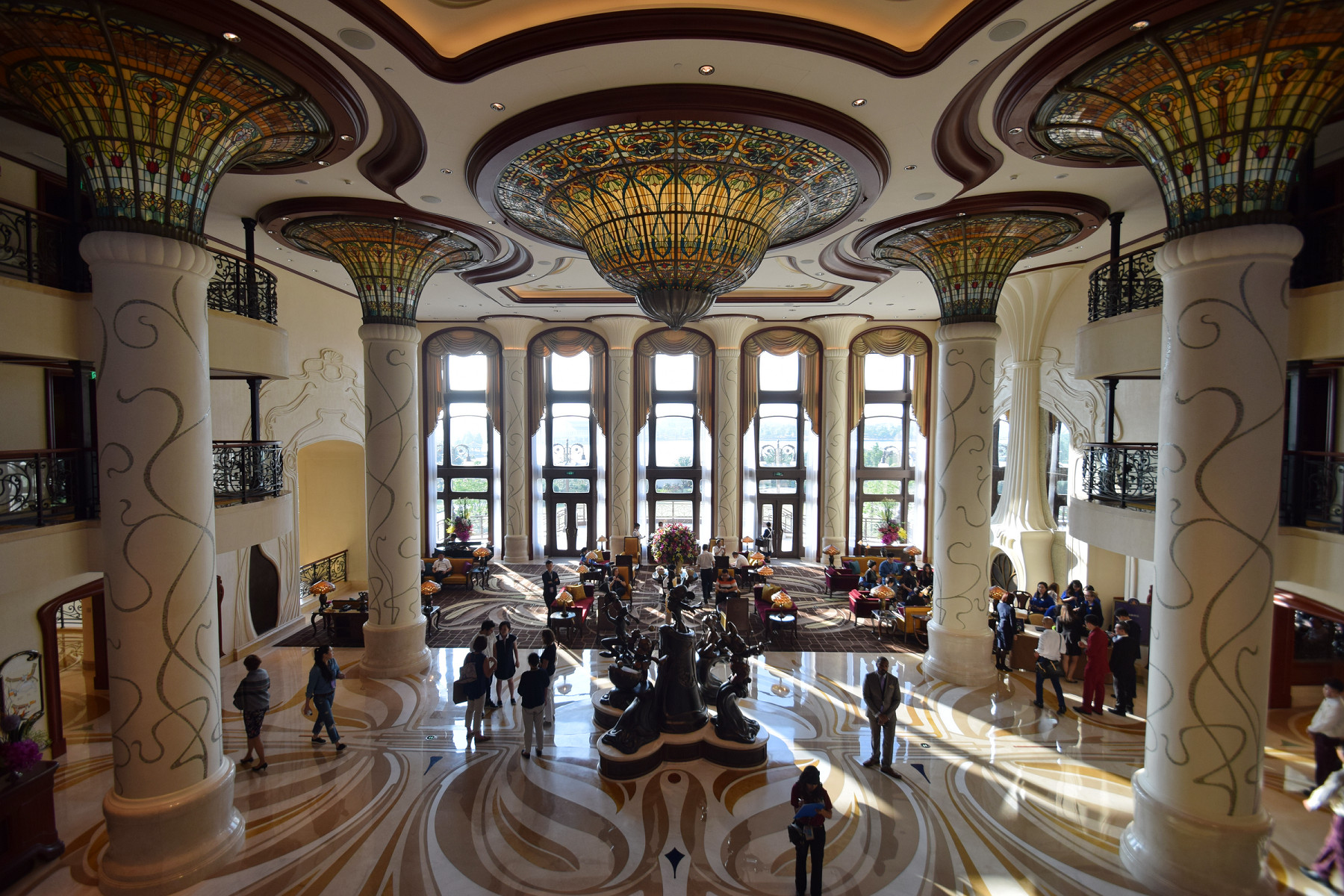
Shanghai Disneyland Hotel Grand Lobby
