= Francesca's =

American clothing and accessories retailer

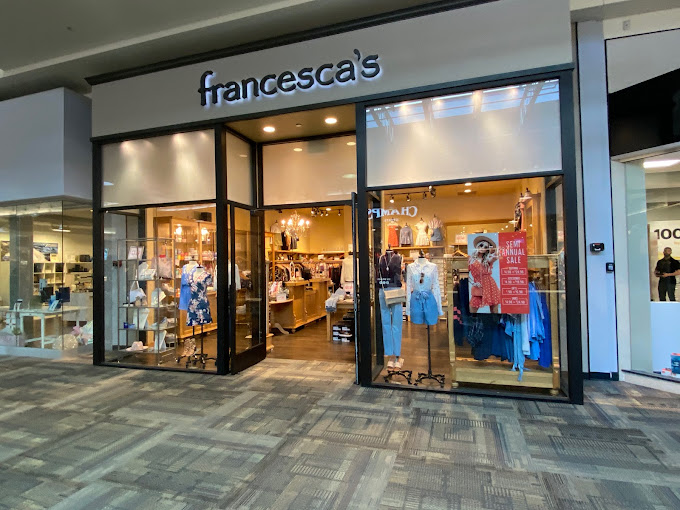
- A Francesca's store at Southern Park Mall in Boardman, Ohio
- Industry: Retail
- Founded: 1999; 27 years ago, Houston, Texas
- Founder: Chong Yi; Kyong Gill; Insuk Koo; John De Meritt
- Defunct: March 29, 2026
- Fate: Chapter 11 bankruptcy; Liquidation
- Headquarters: Houston, Texas, U.S.
- Number of locations: 410 (2023)
- Key people: Andrew Clarke (President and CEO)
- Products: Clothing and accessories
- Owner: TerraMar Capital; Tiger Capital Management (2021–present)
- Subsidiaries: Franki by Francesca's; Richer Poorer

Francesca's (stylized as francesca's, and formerly known as Francesca's Collections) was an American women's fashion and accessories company based in Houston, Texas. As of 2021, the company operated 466 stores across the United States, all of which have since been liquidated after the company went bankrupt twice.

== History ==
=== Founding and expansion ===
Francesca's was founded in 1999 by three siblings, Chong Yi, Kyong Gill, Insuk Koo, and their close affiliate friend, John De Meritt, and they opened the first Francesca's stores in Houston, Texas. Francesca's began trading on the Nasdaq Global Select Market on July 22, 2011, trading under the symbol, "FRAN".

On May 14, 2012, Gene Morphis, who at the time was serving position as CFO at Francesca's, was terminated from his position after finding out that improperly communicated private company information was found through social media, but the company refused to state what information was publicly shared, nor where the information was posted on what form of social media. A few months later, on September 4, 2012, John De Meritt, who at the time was serving position as CEO at Francesca's, announced that he would be retiring from the company by the end of 2012, after shares fell 4% at $34.51 in an afternoon trading. De Merrit would appoint President Neill Davis as CEO once he retires effective January 1, 2013.

In 2014, the company saw a Q4 profit in its stock, and announced that up to 85 stores would open throughout the year. On December 4, 2014, Michael Barnes was named the new CEO of Francesca's. Barnes was also CEO of Signet Jewelers and was president and COO of Fossil.

=== Decline, store closures and bankruptcy ===
On May 17, 2016, as Francesca's shares began to plunge, CEO Michael Barnes announced that he would be departing from the company. The company also stated that its stock was at its lowest since the company began trading back in 2011. Barnes would be replaced with Steven P. Lawrence as CEO and President.

On January 31, 2019, Francesca's announced that it was exploring strategic options to save itself, including closing down stores and a potential sale. As a result, Steven P. Lawrence announced that he would be retiring after the announcement, and Michael Prendergast would replace him as CEO effective immediately. On June 13, 2019, Francesca's announced that it would be permanently shuttering up to 30 stores as its shares declined by approximately 13%. CEO Michael Prendergast stated that Francesca's was in the early stages of a comeback, and it has plans to sell its current inventory by the end of Q2 2019, and would offer new and improved products later throughout the year.

On February 14, 2020, Michael Prendergast resigned as CEO of Francesca's, and announced that Andrew Clarke would replace him as president and CEO of the company, effective March 9. Clarke also worked as President of Ascena Retail Group. On November 16, 2020, Francesca's announced that it might be forced to file for Chapter 11 bankruptcy, amongst other options to revitalize its finances. Plans call for up to 140 stores to close by the end of January 2021. The company blamed the COVID-19 pandemic as the main cause for its significant financial hit that stopped physical store sales after all of its stores were forced to temporarily close, amongst a steep decline in mall traffic while also trying to boost online sales.

On December 3, 2020, Francesca's declared voluntary Chapter 11 of the United States Bankruptcy Code in the United States District Court for the District of Delaware. The company has plans to sell its assets, including its online business and brick and mortar stores. The company also stated that it gained $25 million in financing from Tiger Finance, which would allow for the company to pursue a sales process that would allow for the company to stay afloat during the bankruptcy procedure while still in the process of liquidating 140 stores by the end of January 2021. On December 7, 2020, Francesca's announced that it would be closing an additional 97 stores, and that its stock would be delisted from the Nasdaq after trading for nearly a decade, effective December 15, 2020.

On January 21, 2021, Francesca's won court approval to sell its assets out of bankruptcy to TerraMar Capital and Tiger Capital Management, who would plan on keeping up to 275 stores open and keep the management team and employees intact. On May 6, 2021, Francesca's filed a proposed liquidation plan a couple of months after its sale to TerraMar Capital and Tiger Capital Management. The plan would wind down the business and would sell assets to its creditors and bondholders.

=== Post-bankruptcy ===
On September 3, 2021, after completing its bankruptcy reorganization and avoiding liquidation, Francesca's announced that it was beginning to reopen many of its previously closed stores that closed earlier in the year. It was also testing new concept stores, including launching and opening two new tween store concepts called Franki by Francesca's by December 2021. 9 more Franki stores would open by the end of 2022. In April 2023, Francesca's announced that it would launch a sport collection for its Franki division, called Franki Sport. The new collection line would sell sport bras, leggings, tracksuits, jackets, tennis skirts, bike shorts, running shorts, etc.

On February 1, 2023, Francesca's announced that they would be teaming up with ThredUp to create a platform called 'Forever Francesca's', which would allow customers to purchase secondhand items from Francesca's, and will give shopping credit to customers by sending in items.

On May 12, 2023, Francesca's announced that it would acquire lifestyle brand Richer Poorer as a fully owned subsidiary. Before it filed for bankruptcy, Francesca's operated nearly 450 stores under the Francesca's and Franki by Francesca's banners.

On January 15, 2026, Francesca's announced that it would close all of its remaining 450 locations nationwide as it plans to liquidate all of its remaining assets. Liquidation sales began at all stores as early as January 16. Days later, the company was accused of laying off employees without prior notice and for owing vendors over $250 million in unpaid invoices. The company filed for Chapter 11 bankruptcy for the second time on February 5, 2026. The last day of business for Francesca's locations was on March 29, 2026.
