= Disney Village =

Shopping, dining and entertainment complex in Disneyland Paris

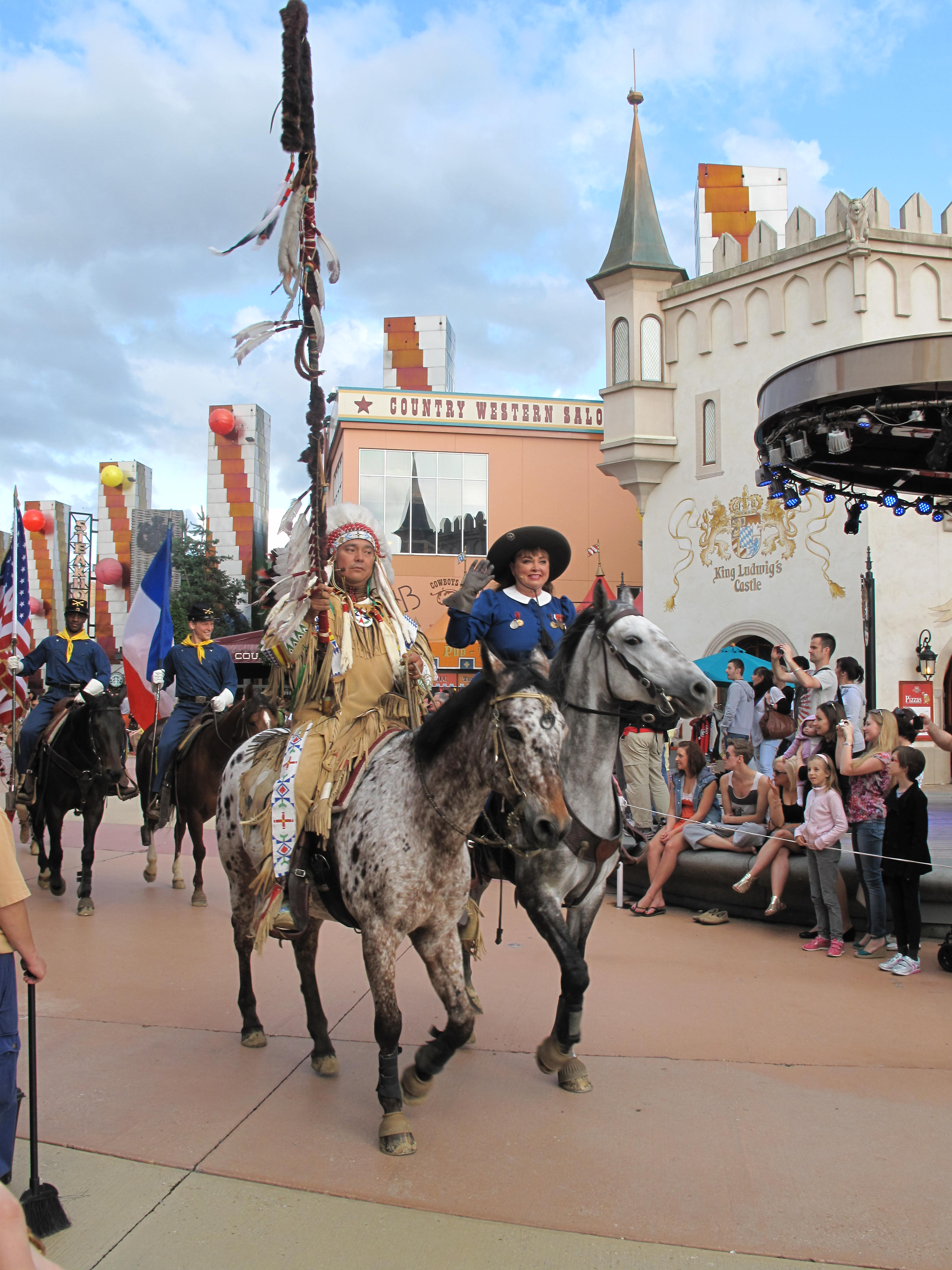
- A parade in Disney Village
- Interactive map of Disney Village
- Location: Disneyland Paris, Paris, France
- Coordinates: 48°52′09″N 2°47′05″E
- Opened: 12 April 1992; 34 years ago
- Operated by: Disneyland Paris
- Theme: Outdoor entertainment area
- Website: www.disneylandparis.com/en-us/destinations/disney-village/

Disney Village is a shopping, dining, and entertainment complex in Disneyland Paris, located in the town of Marne-la-Vallée, France. Originally named Festival Disney, it opened on 12 April 1992, covering an area of approximately 18,000 square metres (190,000 sq ft) inside what was then known as Euro Disney Resort.

Based on Walt Disney World's Disney Village Marketplace (now Disney Springs), Disney Village was designed by architect Frank Gehry with towers of oxidized silver and bronze-colored stainless steel under a canopy of lights. It is adjacent to the two theme parks of Disneyland Paris and the Lake Buena Vista hotel area.

== History ==
=== Original concept ===
The Festival Disney logo

Disney specified that the primary focus of the new facility should be entertainment. It was envisioned as an attraction inside of the Euro Disney Resort, as well as a free transitional space for visitors of the Euro Disneyland theme park and train passengers from the TGV/RER station traveling to the resort hotels. The space would include numerous shops, bars, concerts, shows, and nightclubs.

The original concept was a large, open space full of life and music. It would be lit from all sides around a central avenue and include a starry sky as its crowning feature. The columns that would support this sky would be the remnants of an old power station, which had been left standing after the site had been converted.

Gehry noted:

The idea of a station in the U.S. made me think of power stations which are often found this close to a railway line. Festival Disney is a bright place full of life. The power stations are illuminated at night, hence my idea of a network of 3,600 low-intensity bulbs that cover all of the structures. Naturally, the lights will be suspended between towers and, as a measure of the design process, I blew and embellished the towers that I wanted to sparkle without merely being decorative. Once the sky and towers were imagined, I disposed of buildings and other parts of a normal avenue.

=== Changes and alterations ===
Although the starry sky was generally well-received, the same could not be said for many other aspects of Festival Disney. From the beginning, guests and cast members alike criticized the project, perceiving it as having a cold, industrial, and soulless atmosphere. As a result, many changes were made to Gehry's original concept. Metal frames that had been placed on many of the pylons were removed and replaced with statues and food counters.

In 1996, just four years after opening, Festival Disney was renamed Disney Village. Popular restaurant chain Planet Hollywood opened in front of the Buffalo Bill's Wild West Show building, and the following year an eight-screen Gaumont multiplex cinema complex opened next door to Planet Hollywood, blocking the Wild West Show's original entrance.

Many changes and adjustments took place in existing buildings over the next 10 years, such as the opening of Café Mickey in 2002 (replacing the Los Angeles Bar & Grill), the opening of King Ludwig's Castle in 2003 (replacing Rock 'n' Roll America), and the opening of the Rainforest Café in 1999 (replacing Key West). On January 25, 1999, a large McDonald's fast food restaurant opened with a theme based on Italy's Commedia dell'arte. Later in 2004, a 570-seat IMAX cinema opened as part of the Gaumont multiplex. Finally, on December 3, 2004, an Art Deco themed multi-story parking structure called VINCI Park (now Indigo) opened.

In 2004, the resort management team began renovations that would take several years to complete. The neon lights, oversized signs, and central stage were all removed from the main area. Colorfully lit balloons were added to the remaining columns for nighttime lighting. PanoraMagique, one of the largest captive balloons in the world, opened in April 2005. It carries up to 30 passengers 100 metres (330 ft) into the sky. In 2008, resort management added large planters that contained trees, hedges, and flowers to the main thoroughfare. Terraces were added to restaurants and cafés, and the facades of buildings were updated. In the same year, a new beverage stand/snack bar was added near the entrance to Disney Village, and the tourist kiosk nearby was rebuilt in more of a neo-industrial Parisian style. In 2009, the Buffalo Trading Company closed and the premises are now occupied by a Starbucks coffee house.

As part of a €2 billion expansion of the resort, which Disney announced back in 2018, it has been confirmed that Disney Village will receive an overhaul and potential expansion. Further details have not yet been confirmed.

== Current venues ==
=== Attractions and entertainment ===
- Disney Stadium Arcade Games
- Disney Village Marina
- Disney Village Stage
- Dôme Disney Village: Conference center for professional event and evenings. It sometimes hosts public events like the 2005 production of Grease, concerts or sports competitions.
- Gaumont Disney Village: Cinema with IMAX, 4DX and D-Box Technologies
- PanoraMagique: Aerophile Observational Balloon

=== Restaurants and bars ===
- Annette's Diner (table service restaurant) – long term closed
- Ben & Jerry's Kiosque De Glaces (ice cream kiosk)
- Billy Bob's Country Western Saloon (bar with light entertainment and snacks)
- Earl of Sandwich (counter service restaurant)
- Five Guys (counter service restaurant)
- La Grange (buffet)
- McDonald's (counter service restaurant)
- Rainforest Cafe (table service restaurant)
- Rosalie (table service restaurant) – replaced Café Mickey
- Sports Bar (bar with table service)
- Starbucks (coffee house)
- The Steakhouse (table service restaurant)
- The Royal Pub (table service restaurant) – replaced King Ludwig's Castle
- Vapiano (counter service restaurant)

=== Shopping ===
Disney Store in Disney Village

- World of Disney
- Disney Store
- Disney Fashion
- Disney Fashion jr
- The Disney Gallery
- World of Toys
- Lego Store
- Rainforest Cafe Retail Village
- Bureau de change

== Closed venues ==
- Streets of America – closed in 1993
- The Surf Shop – closed in 1993
- Key West Seafood – closed in 1999
- Los Angeles Bar & Grill – closed in 2002
- Rock'n'Roll America – closed in 2003
- Buffalo Trading Company – closed in 2009
- Hurricanes Discotheque – closed on 1 March 2010
- Hollywood Pictures – closed in July 2013
- NEX Fun Bowling & Games – closed in 2016
- New York Style Sandwiches – counter service restaurant
- Buffalo Bill's Wild West Show with Mickey & Friends: an original show re-enacted twice nightly in a purpose-built arena since 1992. Despite technological production elements, the show retained a high degree of authenticity, including bison, Longhorn cattle, and quarter horses imported from North America. The cast included Native American members, as well as trained rodeo cowboys. Most of the more famous elements of the original show remain, including the Pony Express, Indian Attack, and Stagecoach Robbery. A dinner show entry included a cowboy hat and a themed menu of chili and barbecue ribs. The show was approaching world-record attendance with over 10,000 shows performed in front of 8.5 million guests. Since 2009, the show starred Mickey Mouse and his friends. – closed in 2020
- Café Mickey (table service restaurant) – closed in 2020, replaced by Rosalie
- Planet Hollywood (table service restaurant) – closed in 2023
- King Ludwig's Castle (table service restaurant) – closed in 2023 to be replaced by The Royal Pub.
- Coca-Cola Cool Stop (refreshment kiosk) – closed in January 2024

== See also ==
- List of works by Frank Gehry
- Disney Springs at Walt Disney World Resort
- Downtown Disney (California) at Disneyland Resort
- Ikspiari at Tokyo Disney Resort
