= Shanghai Disney Resort =

Theme resort by Walt Disney Parks and Resorts

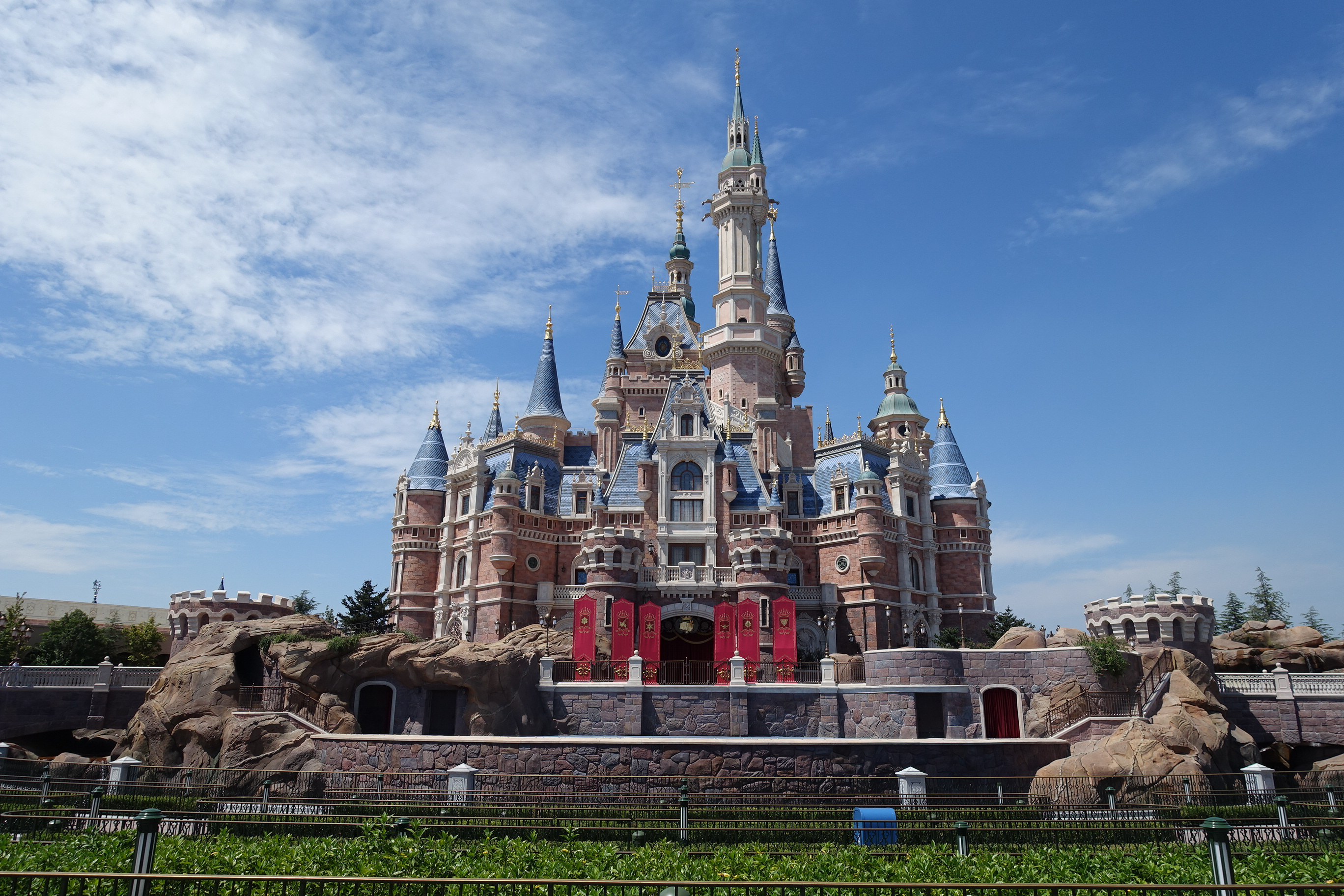
- The Enchanted Storybook Castle at Shanghai Disneyland
- Native name: 上海迪士尼度假区
- Romanized name: Shànghǎi Díshìní Dùjiàqū
- Industry: Theme parks and resorts
- Founded: June 16, 2016; 10 years ago
- Headquarters: Pudong, Shanghai, China 31.1440°N 121.6570°E
- Owner: Shanghai Shendi Group (57%); The Walt Disney Company (43%)
- Website: Official website

Shanghai Disney Resort (Chinese: 上海迪士尼度假区) is a themed resort in Pudong, Shanghai, China. The resort opened to the public on June 16, 2016. It is the first Disneyland in mainland China. It is also the sixth Disney resort worldwide, after Disneyland Resort, Walt Disney World Resort, Tokyo Disney Resort, Disneyland Paris and Hong Kong Disneyland Resort.

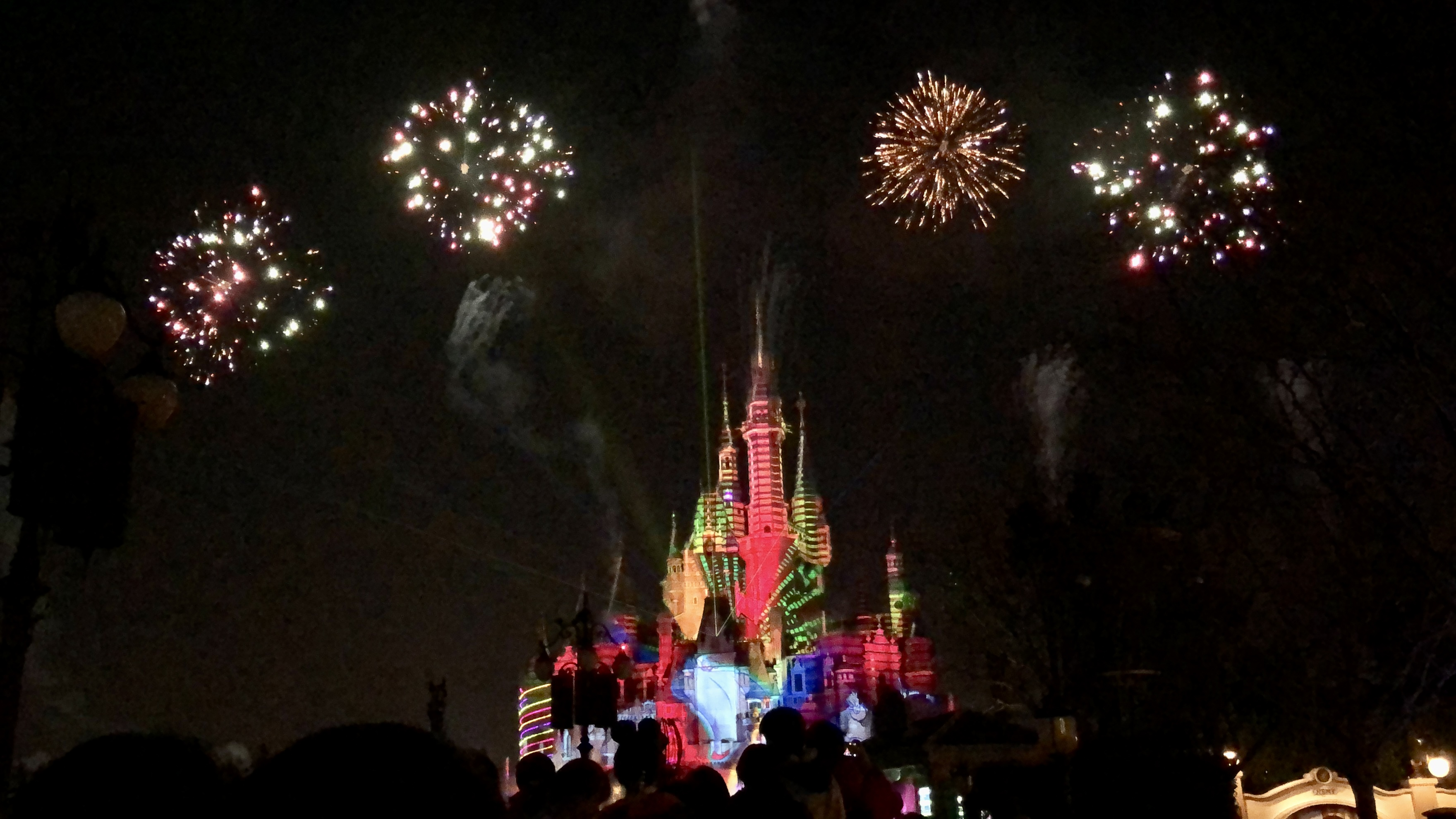
Fireworks surrounding the Enchanted Storybook Castle in 2021

The resort features Shanghai Disneyland, an entertainment district, two themed hotels, recreational facilities, a lake and associated parking and transportation hubs. Additional phases will see the development of two additional theme parks at the resort. The site will cover 390 hectares (963 acres) in Pudong, or approximately three times the size of Hong Kong Disneyland, at a cost of CN¥ 24.5 billion (US$3.7 billion) for the new theme park and an additional CN¥ 4.5 billion (US$0.7 billion) to build other aspects of the resort, totaling CN¥ 34 billion (US$5.5 billion). The Walt Disney Company owns 43 percent of the resort; the majority 57 percent is held by Shanghai Shendi Group, a joint venture of three companies owned by the Shanghai government.

== History ==
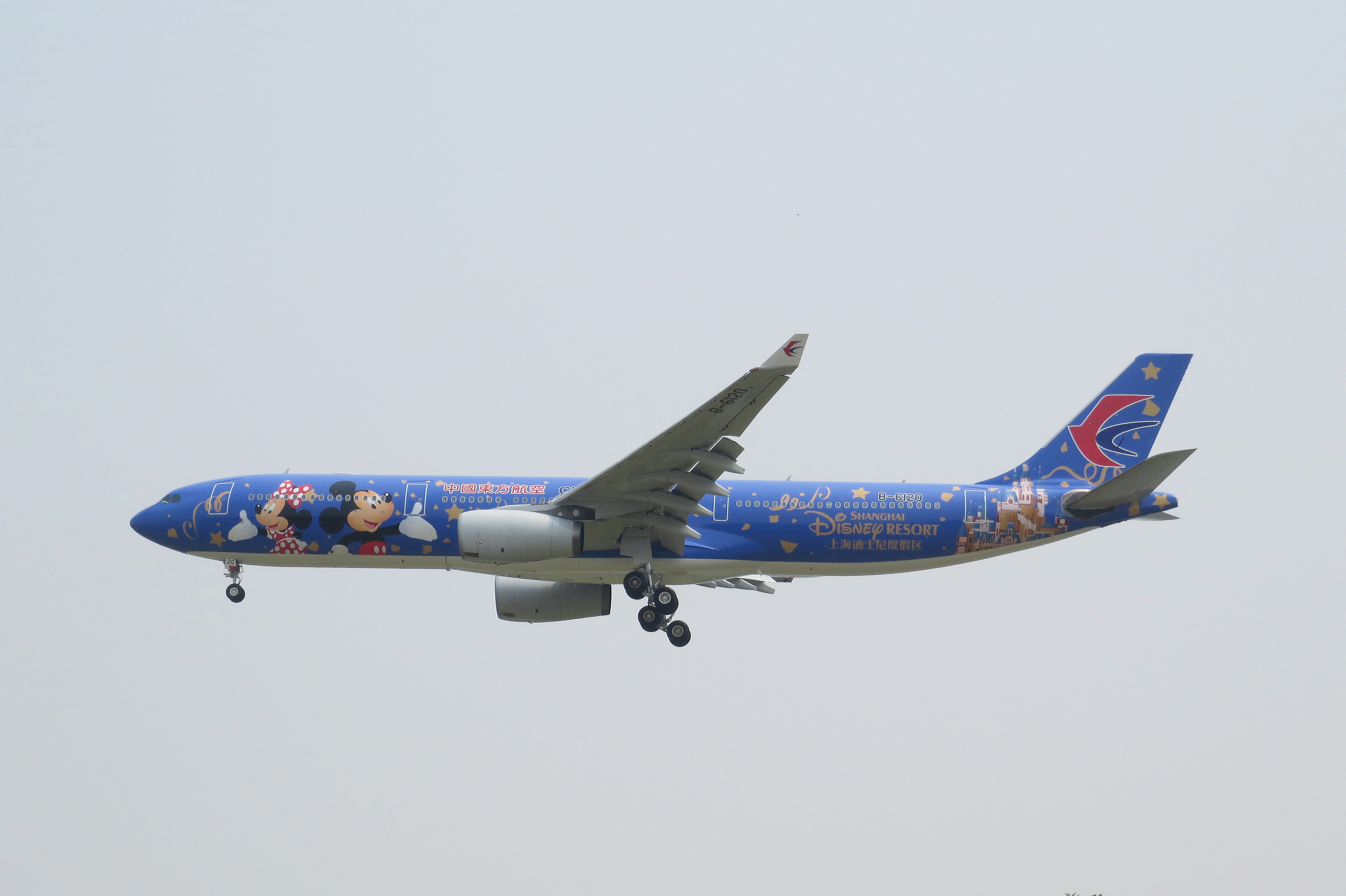
China Eastern Airlines, the major airline based in Shanghai, painted one of its Airbus A330-300s in Shanghai Disney Resort livery.

Location scouting in Pudong began in 1999 with Bob Iger. The park was first envisaged in the early 2000s, and negotiation for Shanghai Disney Resort began around 2001. However, in order to help Hong Kong Disneyland grow, the Chinese national government deliberately slowed the development of Shanghai Disney. The Hong Kong resort opened in 2005, two years after the SARS epidemic devastated Hong Kong's economy, and it was hoped that Hong Kong Disneyland would help the city's tourism industry recover.

On November 4, 2009, the Shanghai Municipal Government announced that the Shanghai Disney project had been approved by the national government, with an estimated total investment of CN¥ 24.4 billion. Land near the proposed production site dramatically increased in value after the announcement was made. In January 2011, a government official confirmed that Shanghai Disneyland would be 2–3 times the size of Hong Kong Disneyland and would eventually contain three theme parks.

On April 7, 2011, groundbreaking began at the Shanghai Disneyland Resort site. Major construction work started on April 8, 2011, targeting a 2016 spring opening. The resort was planned to cover an area of 4 km^{2} (1.5 sq mi) and was expected to cost CN¥ 25 billion (US$3.66 billion). The project was financed by several large Chinese state-owned enterprises in Shanghai, who formed a joint venture with the Walt Disney Company. "The first-phase of the project will be to the South of Huanglou Area, an area in Chuansha Town, the southeast suburbs of Shanghai's Pudong area; the second phase will extend further southwest," an urban developer from Shanghai stated. DeSimone Consulting Engineers were the structural engineers behind the construction work.

Walt Disney Imagineering led the design of the resort. Key designers included Bob Weis as Lead Executive Designer and Scot Drake as Tomorrowland Lead Designer. Mike Ross served as Overall Theme Park Project Architect, while [to: Rolando Mendoza served as Design and Delivery Executive, implementing Virtual Design and Construction (VDC) and Building Information Modeling (BIM) strategies for project integration.

On February 27, 2014, PepsiCo announced a strategic partnership with the resort, making the Shanghai Resort the first Disney property in 25 years to sell Pepsi products and not Coca-Cola products.

On April 28, 2014, Disney CEO Bob Iger announced an extra US$800 million investment to add additional rides and entertainment by opening day, bringing the total budget to US$5.5 billion. In February 2016, it was rumored that the resort was still behind schedule and was over budget, causing the United States–based resorts (Disneyland Resort and Walt Disney World Resort) to make budget cuts. That same month, Disney announced that Hong Kong Disneyland Resort reported its first loss in four years, losing HK$148 million, and falling 9.3% in annual attendance, to 6.8 million visitors. Analysts attributed this to fewer mainland Chinese tourists visit, hurt by a combination of China's slowdown, political unrest, and a weak yuan relative to the Hong Kong dollar, as well as the upcoming opening of the Shanghai Resort. In total, more than 100,000 workers constructed the first phase of the resort over 5 years. The facility incorporated 72,000 metric tons of structural steel and 130 kilometres (81 mi) of utility piping. The final price tag was US$5.5 billion.

=== Operating ===
Shanghai Disney Resort officially opened at noon on June 16, 2016. It was reported that the "colorful opening ceremony" featured speeches, fireworks, and mostly orderly crowds in spite of the rain. One of the dignitaries, Vice Premier Wang Yang, joked that the wet weather foretold good luck for the resort because it represented a "rain of U.S. dollars and RMB".

The park's first expansion, Toy Story Land, opened in second quarter 2018. On December 10, 2019, the resort began construction on its second expansion, Zootopia-themed land, next to Fantasyland.

On January 26, 2020, the resort temporarily closed as a result of what became the COVID-19 pandemic. The resort partially reopened on March 9, with the Shanghai Disneyland Hotel, Disneytown, and Wishing Star Park resuming limited operations with new health and safety protocols in place. Disney fully reopened Shanghai Disney Resort on May 11, with new social distancing guidelines and temperature checks in place.

In 2022, Shanghai Disney Resort closed again, from March 21 through June 29, due to an increase in COVID-19 cases in China. On October 31, 2022 it was announced that the park would once again close indefinitely due to a surge in cases. Some resort facilities reopened on November 17, followed by a full reopening on November 25, closure from November 29 to December 7, and reopening again on December 8.

On December 20, 2023, Shanghai Disney Resort officially opened Zootopia, Disney's first Zootopia-themed area.

In November 2025, the resort unveiled plans for a fourth themed hotel and an expansion of its shopping and dining district, which are fueled by growing demand from guests and fans from across China and around the world. According to the announcement, the area next to Shanghai Disneyland's main entrance will become the fourth themed hotel.

== Attractions and features ==
=== Shanghai Disneyland ===
Like most other Disney Resorts around the world, Shanghai Disneyland Resort features a flagship park called Shanghai Disneyland. The park is similar in style to Disney's other Disneyland-style parks, containing traditional and newly created themed lands. One of the aims of the park is the combination of Disney stories and characters with attractions that are specifically designed for Chinese guests. An interactive castle called Enchanted Storybook Castle lies at the center of the park. Other large-scale performance venues are found across the park. The original theme lands, or areas with the park are Adventure Isle, Gardens of Imagination, Mickey Avenue, Tomorrowland, Treasure Cove and Fantasyland. With the additional theme land added, Toy Story Land, the park has seven theme lands. In 2019, Disney announced a new theme land for the park, City of Zootopia, inspired by the 2016 film Zootopia. It opened on December 20, 2023.

=== Hotels ===
The resort has two themed hotels. The Shanghai Disneyland Hotel has 420 rooms and offers a free water taxi service across the Wishing Star Lake to the theme park. The Toy Story Hotel, with 800 rooms, features the Sunnyside Cafe, which is decorated with Chinese-style kites flown by Disney characters.

The resort has started construction on its third hotel as Shanghai Disney Enchanted Star Hotel, a 400-room property inspired by Art Nouveau architecture and design (which will be open on December 16, 2026), as well as a fourth hotel situated to the right of the park entrance.

=== Disneytown ===
The Disneytown area features large venues for retail shopping, dining, and entertainment.

== Transportation ==
Metro Line 11 serves the resort at Disney Resort station. Another nearby station, Shanghai International Resort station, on the Airport Link Line, opened in December 2024. The resort is also served by public buses and internal shuttle buses.

== Management structure ==
The resort's management structure consists of three companies:

- Shanghai International Theme Park Company Limited – 43% owned by the Walt Disney Company, 57% owned by Shanghai Shendi Group – ownership company for theme parks within the resort
- Shanghai International Theme Park and Resort Management Company Limited – 70% owned by Disney Experiences, 30% owned by Shanghai Shendi Group – manages and operates the resort as a whole as well as the project to develop it, on behalf of the ownership companies
- Shanghai Shendi Group itself comprises three companies:
  - Shanghai Lujiazui (Group) Company Limited
  - Shanghai Radio, Film and Television Development Company Limited
  - Jinjiang International Group Holding Company

== See also ==
- Large amusement railways
- Happy Valley Shanghai
- Hong Kong Disneyland Resort
- Universal Beijing
- Legoland Shanghai
- Jinjiang Action Park
