= Walt Disney World Swan and Dolphin Resort =

The Walt Disney World Swan and Dolphin Resort consists of three hotels:

- Walt Disney World Dolphin
- Walt Disney World Swan
- Walt Disney World Swan Reserve
