= Disney's Beach Club Resort =

Hotel at Walt Disney World

Coordinates: 28.371241°N 81.556451°W

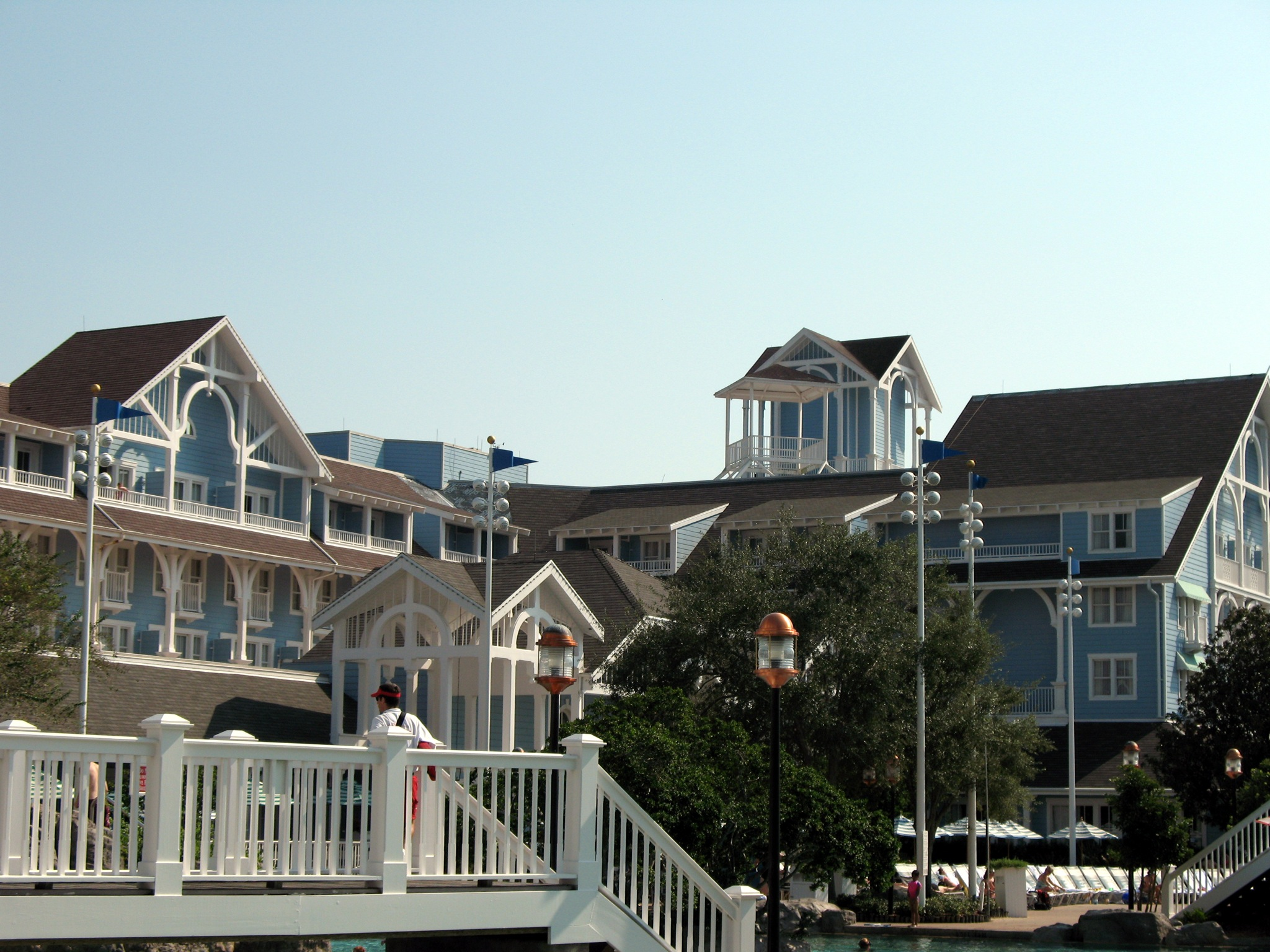
- Beach Club's main building
- Interactive map of the Disney's Beach Club Resort area

General information
- Type: Resort
- Location: Epcot Resort Area
- Opened: November 19, 1990
- Operator: Disney Experiences

Other information
- Number of rooms: 583

Website
- Official website

Disney's Beach Club Resort is a New England-style resort at the Walt Disney World Resort in Bay Lake, Florida. It opened on November 19, 1990. The resort is owned and operated by Disney Parks, Experiences and Products.

Disney's Beach Club Resort is located on Crescent Lake in the Epcot Resort Area, next to its sister resort, Disney's Yacht Club Resort. The two resorts share amenities and resources, including staff, management, and buses. The resort also includes the Villas, which are Disney Vacation Club properties.

== Resort ==
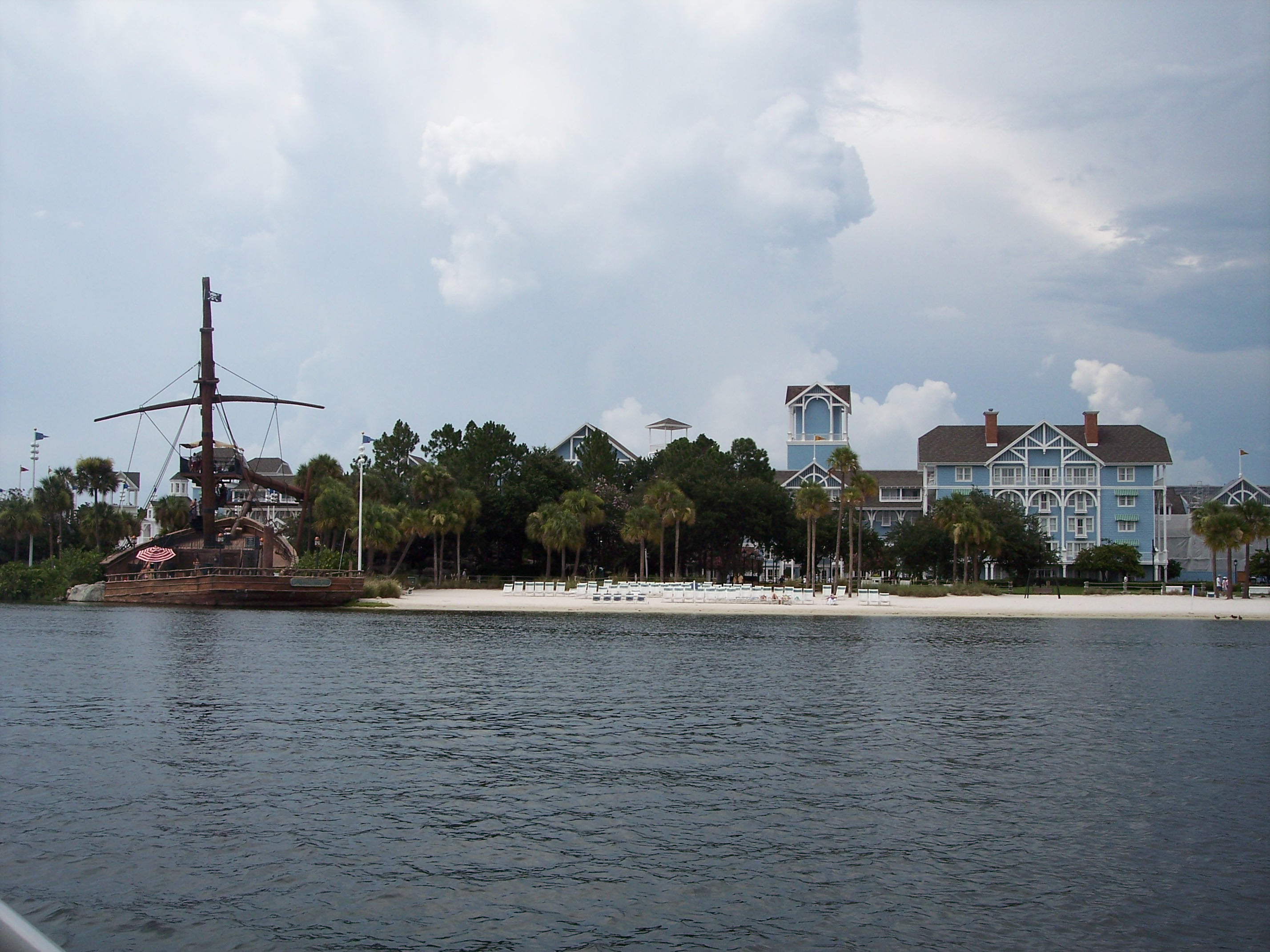
Beach area at Disney's Beach Club Resort

The hotel was designed by the firm of Robert A.M. Stern Architects and themed after the seaside cottages of 19th-century Newport, Rhode Island.

Boat transportation from the resort runs to Epcot and Disney's Hollywood Studios, as well as Disney's Boardwalk Resort and the Walt Disney World Swan and Walt Disney World Dolphin resorts. The resort is approximately five minutes walking distance from Epcot, and roughly fifteen minutes walking distance to Disney's Hollywood Studios. Guests can use the International Gateway entrance to Epcot in World Showcase between the France and United Kingdom pavilions; in front of this entrance, there is also a Disney Skyliner station.

Disney's Beach Club Resort has received the designation in the Florida Green Lodging Program.

The resort offers a fifth-floor Concierge Level with private floor access, a concierge lounge, turndown service, and other amenities. The Concierge Level is home to the resort's Presidential Suite.

== Entertainment ==
=== Dining ===
Disney's Beach Club Resort shares facilities with Disney's Yacht Club Resort, and together they feature four full-service restaurants, a poolside counter-service restaurant, two marketplaces, and several bars and lounges.

Cape May Cafe is the primary table service restaurant at Beach Club Resort. It is a buffet-style dining experience, offering a Character breakfast and a "seafood-and-more" dinner daily.

Beaches & Cream Soda Shop is a 1950s diner-themed restaurant and ice cream shop inspired by the "nostalgia of the Atlantic seashore". It is located near the Stormalong Bay pool and offers both to-go and dine-in service.

Beach Club Marketplace is the resort's quick service location and gift shop, located near the lobby. It offers hot and cold grab ‘n’ go food items for breakfast, lunch, and dinner.

Martha's Vineyard is a New England-inspired bar and lounge offering drinks and appetizers.

Hurricane Hanna's Waterside Bar and Grill is the pool bar and grill located between the two resorts, along the south side of Stormalong Bay.

=== Pools ===
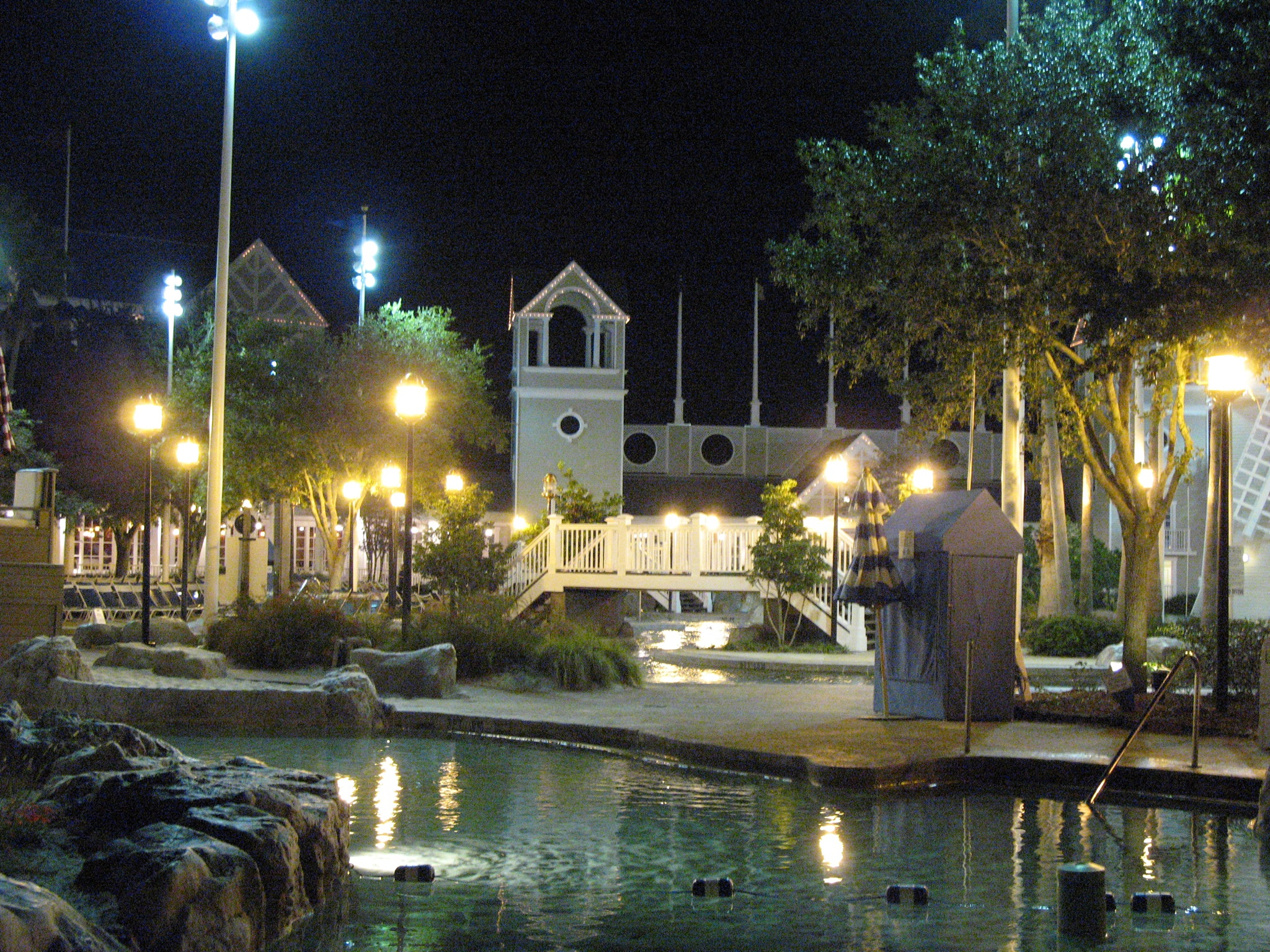
Disney's Beach Club Resort at night

Stormalong Bay is the main 3-acre pool complex at Disney's Yacht and Beach Club resorts that resembles a beach-side water park with its sand-bottom pools, a circular lazy river, waterfall, and a large replica of a shipwreck with one of the highest resort water slides at Walt Disney World. The Stormalong Bay pool complex offers a poolside counter service restaurant and bar, a shallow area for children called the Shipwreck Pool, and an elevated tanning deck. Stormalong Bay is centrally located between both the Beach Club Resort and the Yacht Club Resort, facing Crescent Lake.

Tidal Pool is the quiet pool for Beach Club resort and is found near the volleyball courts and the international gateway entrance to Epcot.

Dunes Cove Pool is a small pool with depths ranging up to about five feet, changing and bathroom facilities, a jacuzzi tub, and barbecue grills located in the Beach Club Villas, serving as the villas quiet pool.

=== Recreation ===
Ship Shape Health Club is a health and fitness center. The health club is centrally between both the Beach Club Resort and the Yacht Club Resort.

Lafferty Place Arcade is an indoor arcade near the Beaches & Cream Soda Shop.

=== Convention center ===
Disney's Yacht & Beach Club Convention Center is a convention center At the Yacht Club Resort and is over 73,000 square feet (6,800 m^{2}) of meeting space.
