= Skyway (Disney) =

Former amusement ride in Disney parks

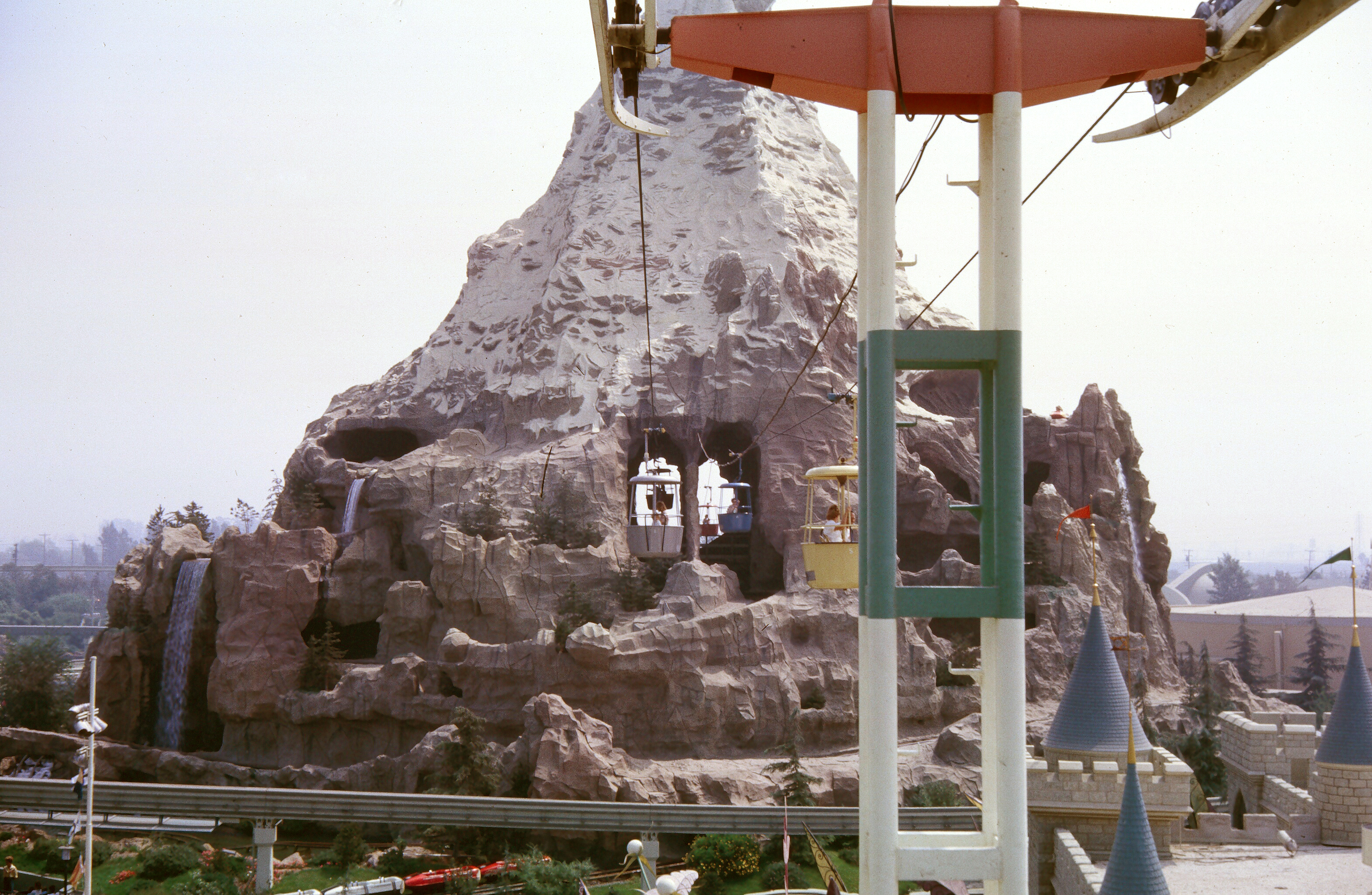
- The Skyway passing through the Matterhorn Bobsleds, 1962

Disneyland
- Area: Fantasyland, Tomorrowland
- Status: Removed
- Soft opening date: June 10, 1956
- Opening date: June 23, 1956
- Closing date: November 9, 1994
- Replaced by: Star Wars: Galaxy's Edge (Fantasyland station)

Magic Kingdom
- Area: Fantasyland, Tomorrowland
- Status: Removed
- Opening date: October 1, 1971
- Closing date: November 10, 1999
- Replaced by: Tangled Restrooms (Fantasyland Station); Disney Skyliner (spiritual successor)

Tokyo Disneyland
- Area: Fantasyland, Tomorrowland
- Status: Removed
- Opening date: April 15, 1983
- Closing date: November 3, 1998
- Replaced by: Pooh's Hunny Hunt (Fantasyland station); Stellar Sweets (Tomorrowland station)

Ride statistics
- Attraction type: Gondola lift
- Manufacturer: Von Roll Holding
- Designer: WED Enterprises
- Model: Vonroll Type 101 detachable monocable gondola lift
- Height: 60 ft (18 m)
- Length: 1,200 ft (370 m)
- Speed: 4 mph (6.4 km/h)
- Vehicle type: Gondola
- Vehicles: 42
- Riders per vehicle: 4
- Duration: 3:36
- Required Ticket: D (Disneyland, Magic Kingdom)

The Skyway was a gondola lift attraction at Disneyland, at the Magic Kingdom, and at Tokyo Disneyland. Since all versions of this attraction took riders back and forth between Fantasyland and Tomorrowland, the route from Tomorrowland was called Skyway to Fantasyland, and the route from Fantasyland was called Skyway to Tomorrowland.

== History ==
=== Disneyland ===
The Skyway at Disneyland opened on June 23, 1956. It was built by Von Roll, Ltd. based in Bern, Switzerland. It was the first Von Roll Type 101 aerial ropeway in the United States. Walt Disney Imagineering bought the ride from Switzerland. It was a 1947 Vonroll sidechair model. In 1959, a major renovation added The Submarine Voyage, the Disneyland Monorail, the Matterhorn (now a Fantasyland Attraction), and the Motor Boat Cruise, but when the Matterhorn was planned, it was designed to be built in the path of the Skyway. The Skyway closed in late 1957, its tallest tower of 60 feet tall was demolished and Matterhorn Bobsleds was built in its spot. The attraction later reopened in 1959 with the expanded Tomorrowland Complex.

During the Fantasyland renovation at Disneyland in the early 1980s, the Skyway made only roundtrips from Tomorrowland.

The Skyway closed on November 9, 1994. The closure was attributed to metal fatigue. Stress cracks had developed inside the Matterhorn tower battery supports, and the only way to do maintenance was to open up the Matterhorn to do work on it. ADA had no bearing on the Skyway's closure as the ride was grandfathered into ANSI code B77.1. The Skyway's operating budget was transferred to Indiana Jones and the Temple of the Forbidden Eye. The holes in the Matterhorn were partially filled in and the Skyway's cable and supports were dismantled within weeks. Despite popular belief, the Skyway was not closed due necessarily to the assessment of risk newly brought on by a park attendee who intentionally jumped out of the passenger cabin of a gondola into a tree below and sued Disney earlier that year.

While the Tomorrowland Skyway station at Disneyland was removed soon after the attraction's closure, the Fantasyland Skyway station remained intact until mid-2016. The sidewalks up to the station were simply chained off from guests, and the chalet remained empty, eventually hidden from view due to overgrown trees. On May 11, 2016, the City of Anaheim approved a permit to The Walt Disney Company for the "demolition of 5,132 square feet for Skyway Building #7301", signaling the likely demolition of the chalet, as land clearing for construction of Star Wars: Galaxy's Edge had reached the chalet's western side. After 22 years, the abandoned chalet was demolished after park closing on June 11, 2016, nearly 60 years after the attraction's opening day.

=== Magic Kingdom ===
At the Magic Kingdom, the Skyway was removed in 1999. During the renovation of Space Mountain, the top half of the Tomorrowland station was demolished in the summer of 2009, with the bottom half serving as a restroom location as of 2025, while the Fantasyland station was used for stroller parking. However, the Fantasyland station was later demolished for a Tangled themed restroom area in 2012.

=== Tokyo Disneyland ===
In 1998, Tokyo Disneyland closed its Skyway. The Fantasyland station was removed to make room for Pooh's Hunny Hunt, while the Tomorrowland station was remodeled into a candy store.

== Legacy ==
A tribute to the Skyway was added to the Matterhorn Bobsleds after an extensive refurbishment in 2015. Several wrecked Skyway buckets and Matterhorn Bobsled vehicles from the park's history appear just past the top of the lift hill, torn to shreds and abandoned by the attraction's Abominable Snowman. These replaced the original flashing crystals.

The Skyway gondola sold for $162,000 at the Heritage Auctions in 2022, claimed to be one of "the rarest Disney attraction vehicles to exist" and "everything on it is original."

After almost twenty years of absence, Disney Parks, Experiences and Products announced in 2017 the construction of the Disney Skyliner at Walt Disney World. While the Skyliner and Skyway are both aerial ropeways, the Skyliner gondolas would be larger than the Skyway cars since the Skyliner would act as a commuter transport. This gondola system, which opened on September 29, 2019, connects four resorts, Caribbean Beach, Art of Animation, Pop Century and Disney's Riviera Resort, with two theme parks, Disney's Hollywood Studios and Epcot; the latter's station located at International Gateway, rather than the front entrance like the Hollywood Studios station.

== Gallery ==
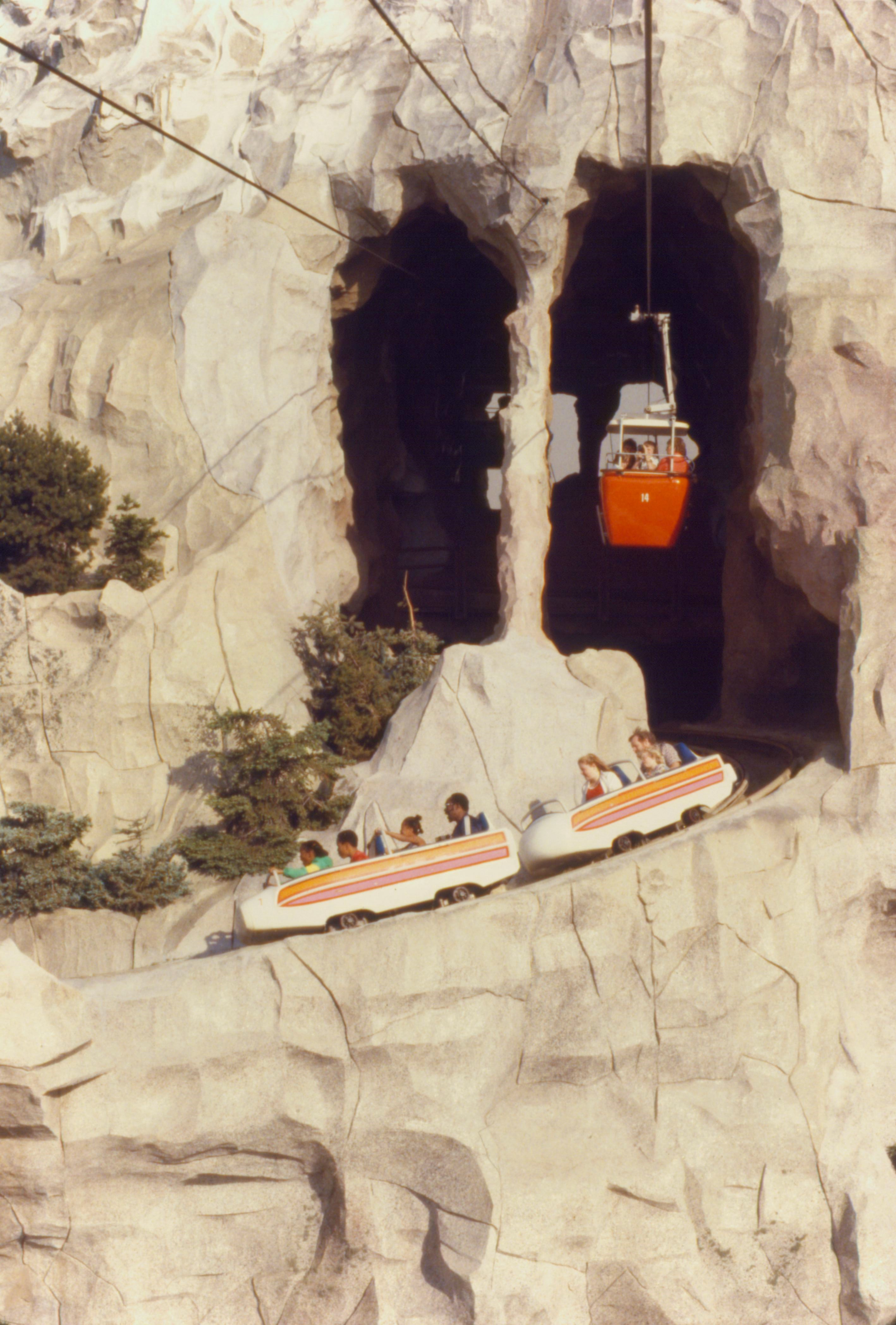
Matterhorn Bobsleds and the Skyway at Disneyland

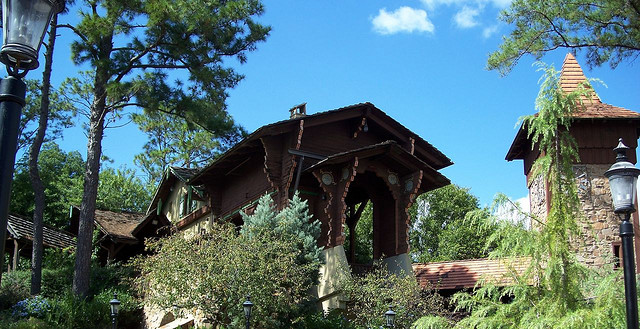
The defunct Fantasyland station at the Magic Kingdom in 2008

The Skyway passing through the Matterhorn Bobsleds

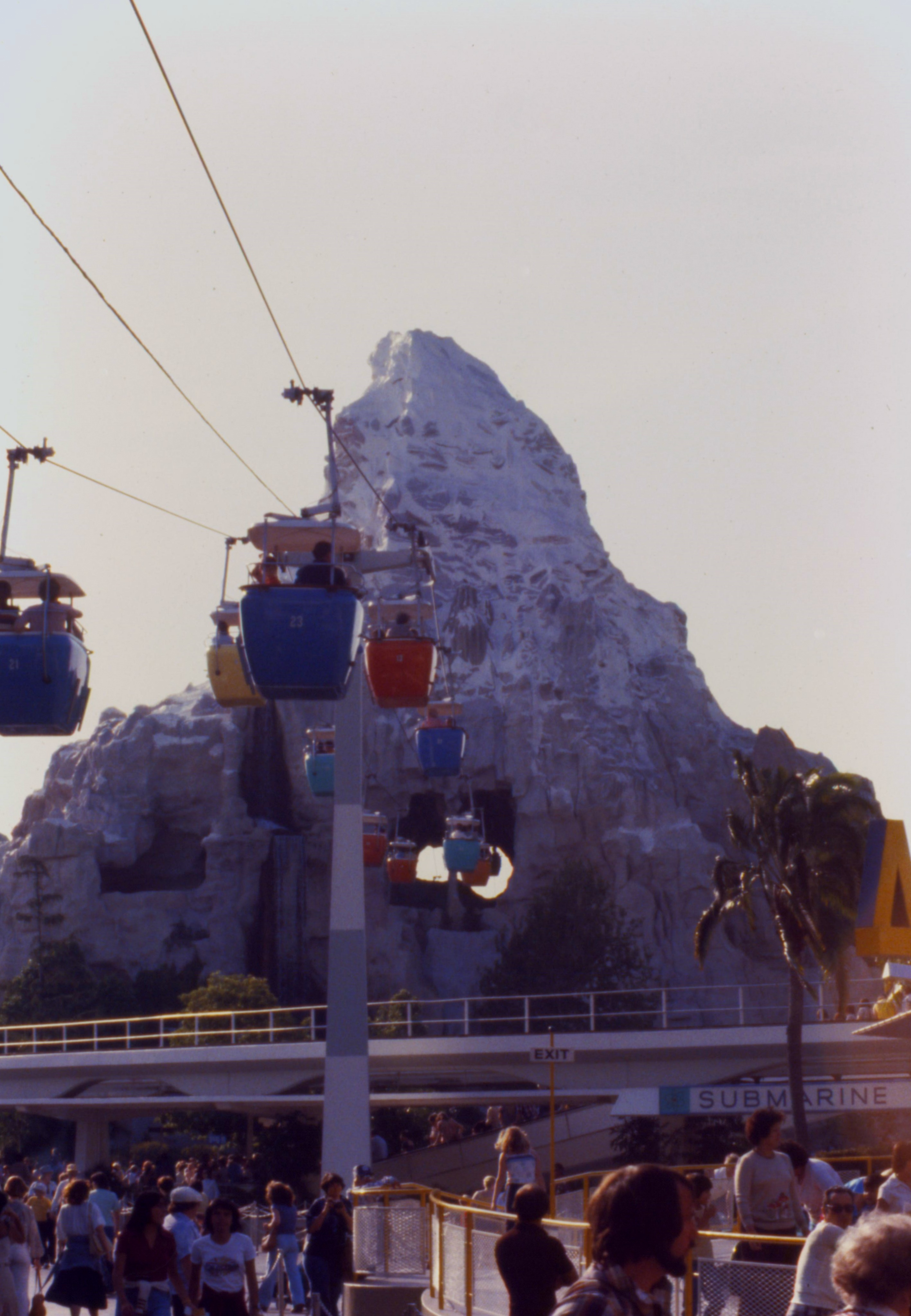
Skyway and Matterhorn Bobsleds in 1979

== See also ==
- List of former Disneyland attractions
- List of Magic Kingdom attractions
- List of incidents at Disneyland Resort
- List of incidents at Walt Disney World
- Disney Skyliner
