= Walt Disney World Dolphin =

Hotel at Walt Disney World

Coordinates: 28°22′02″N 81°33′38″W

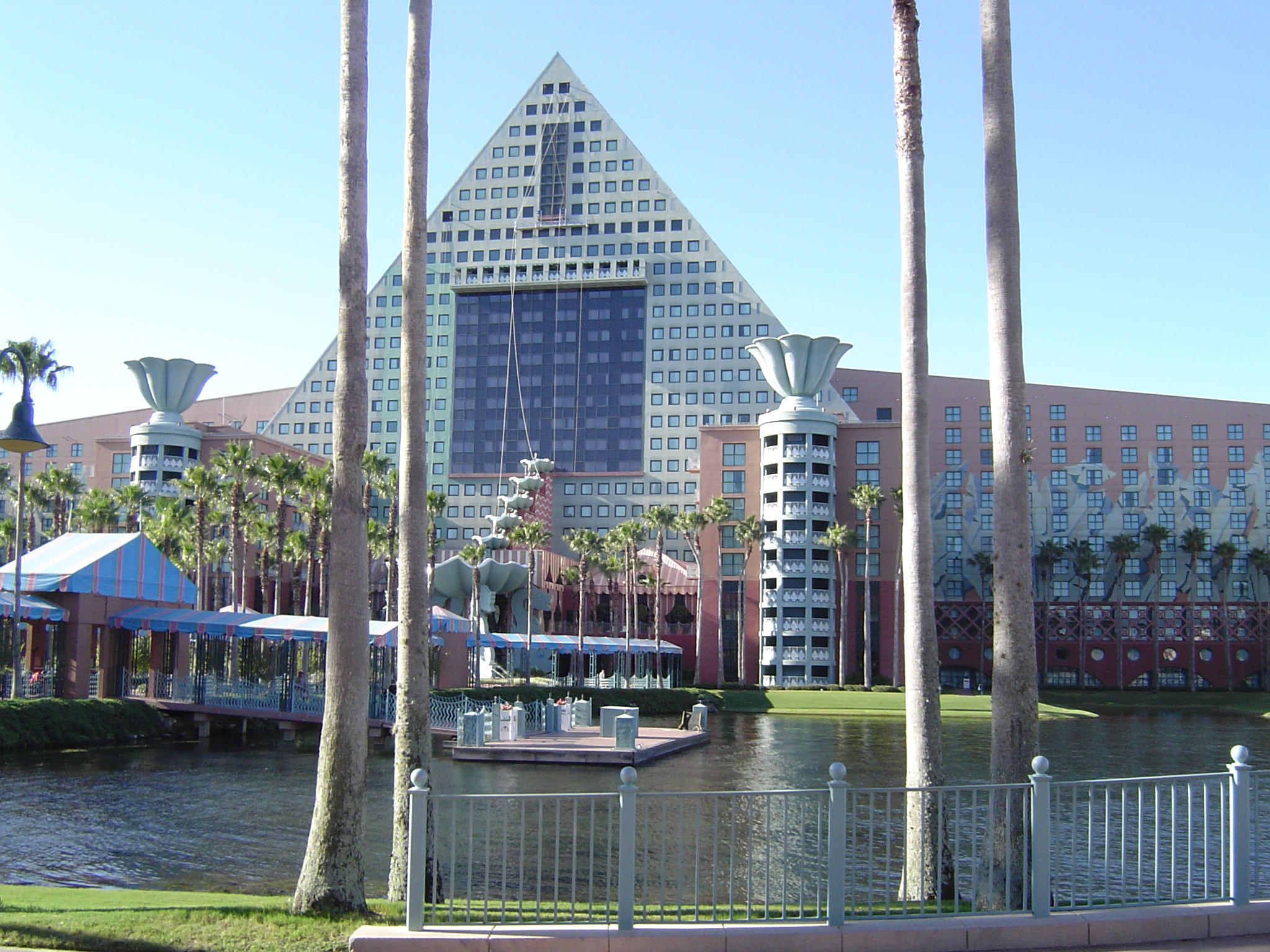

General information
- Type: Resort
- Location: Epcot Resort Area
- Opened: June 4, 1990
- Operator: Sheraton Hotels and Resorts

Other information
- Number of rooms: 1,514

Website
- swandolphin.com

The Walt Disney World Dolphin is a resort hotel located between Epcot and Disney's Hollywood Studios in the Walt Disney World Resort in Bay Lake, Florida, and across from its sister resort, the Walt Disney World Swan, both of which are operated by Marriott International. It is one of the few resorts inside Walt Disney World that is not owned and operated by The Walt Disney Company. The resort opened on June 4, 1990, partially in response to a lack of convention center space inside Walt Disney World.

Both the Swan and Dolphin were designed by Michael Graves and are connected by a covered walkway crossing a lagoon. The hotels were developed as part of a joint venture between Disney, the developer Tishman, insurance company MetLife, and Starwood Hotels and Resorts, which was bought by Marriott in 2016. It is operated by Marriott's Sheraton Hotels and Resorts brand.

The Swan and Dolphin are part of the Walt Disney Collection of resorts, so guests have access to benefits typically available to Disney Resort Hotel guests only, such as early entry.

The Dolphin and Swan share similar elements, but each has a distinctive appearance. The Dolphin is composed of a 257-foot (78 m) tall triangular tower bisecting a 12-story rectangular mass with four 9-story wings on the Swan-side of the structure. The roof of each half of the main mass is adorned with a 56-foot (17 m) tall Dolphin statue. On the main colored facade, there is a turquoise banana-leaf pattern echoed by a similar wave pattern on the Swan.

The statues on top of the Dolphin Hotel are not mammalian dolphins but a stylized version of a nautical dolphin, a common symbol used on old-world nautical maps. The design of the creatures is based on Triton Fountain in Rome.

== History ==
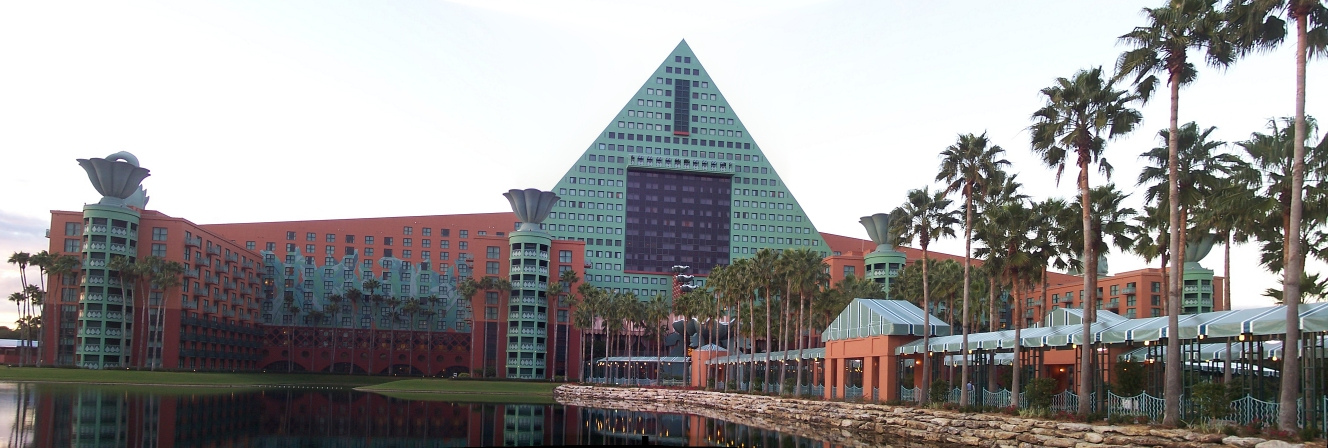
Dolphin hotel panorama

In the early 1980s, The Walt Disney Company was facing a cash crunch. Company leadership decided that when it decided to add more resorts to Walt Disney World, it would partner with property developers and hotel companies, who would take on the costs and risks of building and managing a hotel. The first of these deals came together in 1985 with developer Tishman, who had been the general contractor of Epcot. Under the deal, Tishman would build a Sheraton and a Crowne Plaza on the outskirts of the Walt Disney World complex, near Walt Disney World Village. In order to protect Tishman’s investment, Disney agreed that no new hotels would be built at Walt Disney World during an exclusivity period.

However, by the mid-1980s, Disney's financial fortunes had improved, and CEO Michael Eisner was growing frustrated that the Walt Disney World Resort was losing business to other hotels in the Orlando area that catered to conventions and large meetings. Tishman, worried that Disney may sign a deal with another developer to build a convention hotel at Walt Disney World during its exclusivity period, filed a lawsuit in 1986 seeking US$1.3 billion in damages and canceled the Sheraton and Holiday Inn. The two-year legal battle ended in 1988 with a settlement, Disney and Tishman would form a joint venture with hotel operator Sheraton and investors Aoki and MetLife to build two large hotels with convention facilities.

As part of the deal, no damages would be paid, Disney would receive more say over the design of the complex and a share of revenues, while Tishman would be given a 99-year lease on a much more desirable location within walking distance of Epcot and the yet-to-be-built Hollywood Studios and also connected by a waterway with ferry boats. The $375 million project was to include the 1,514-room Dolphin Resort, the 756-room Swan Resort and 200,000 square feet (19,000 m^{2}) of meeting space.

Disney and Tishman hired architect Michael Graves to design the hotels. Eisner had used Graves for other Disney projects and wanted to continue to build striking, unique buildings. The Dolphin was the largest of the two hotels and, at the time of its construction, was the largest in Florida, edging out the 1,500-room Orlando World Center Marriott. The Dolphin was the second of the two hotels to open and would be operated under Starwood's Sheraton brand.

In 2008, The Walt Disney Dolphin Resort was awarded a One Palm designation through the Florida Green Lodging Program established by the Florida Department of Environmental Protection. The voluntary program encourages operators to adopt “green” practices that reduce waste and conserve natural resources.

== Dining ==
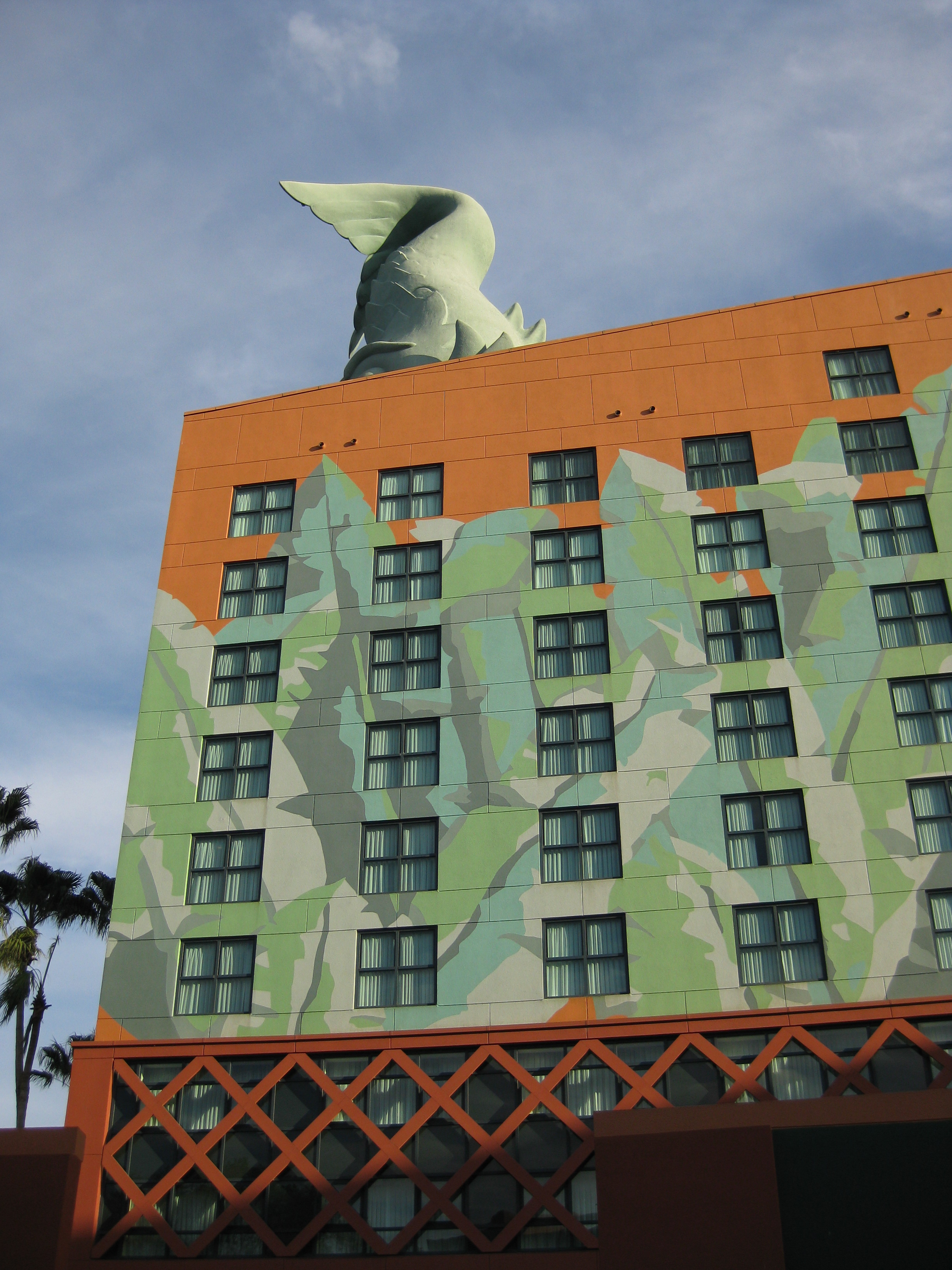
Dolphin on top of the hotel, February 2009

=== Fine dining ===
- Todd English's BlueZoo – Seafood
- Bourbon Steak - Steak and Seafood (formerly Shula's Steakhouse)
- Rosa Mexicano – Mexican Cuisine

=== Casual dining ===
- Cabana Bar and Beach Club – Poolside
- The Fountain – Food and Ice Cream Shop

=== Quick service ===
- Fuel – Snacks and Treats

=== Lounges ===
- Bourbon Steak Lounge
- Todd English's Bluezoo Lounge
- Phins
- Rosa Mexicano Lounge

== Walt Disney World privileges ==
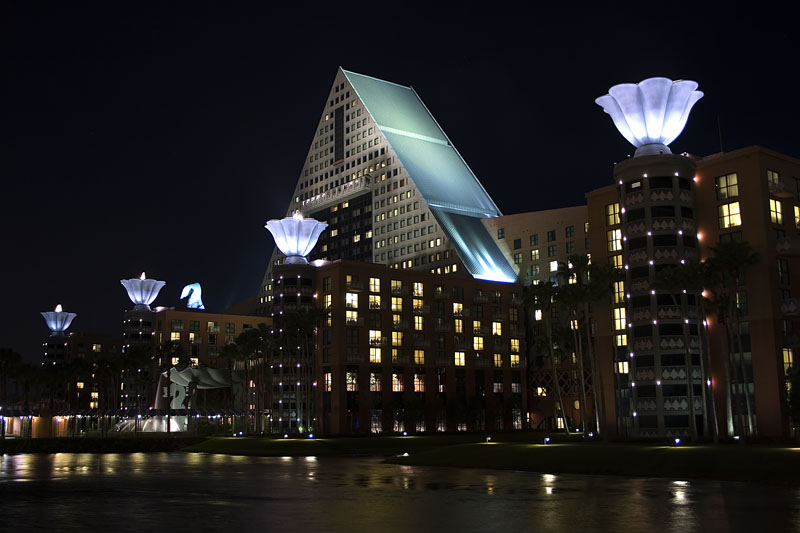
Dolphin Hotel at night

Walt Disney World Swan and Dolphin guests are provided complimentary transportation to all Walt Disney World theme parks and attractions on the Disney Transportation System, via the FriendShip boats (to Epcot and Disney's Hollywood Studios). Length-of-stay park passes are available, as is package delivery from Disney theme park shops to the resort. There is a Walt Disney World guest services desk located in the lobby of each resort. Walt Disney World Swan and Dolphin guests can also use Extended Evening Hours, and can make dining reservations 60 days prior to their arrival at the resort. However, room charging (using hotel key as a credit card at Walt Disney World) is not available and hotel restaurants only participate in the Tables in Wonderland Dining Plan, not the Disney Dining Plan. Room charging within the Walt Disney World Swan and Dolphin Resort Complex is available. Also, guests staying at the Walt Disney World Swan and Dolphin have free theme park parking and priority access to the Disney theme parks during sell out situations.

== Walking path to BoardWalk ==
The Walt Disney World Swan and Dolphin both have access to Disney's BoardWalk Resort via a walking path. This path is located near the FriendShip boat dock behind the two hotels. If you continue past the BoardWalk, the path will then lead you to Disney's Yacht and Beach Club Resorts and further to the EPCOT International Gateway.
