= Disney's Yacht Club Resort =

Hotel at Walt Disney World

Coordinates: 28.370680°N 81.558660°W

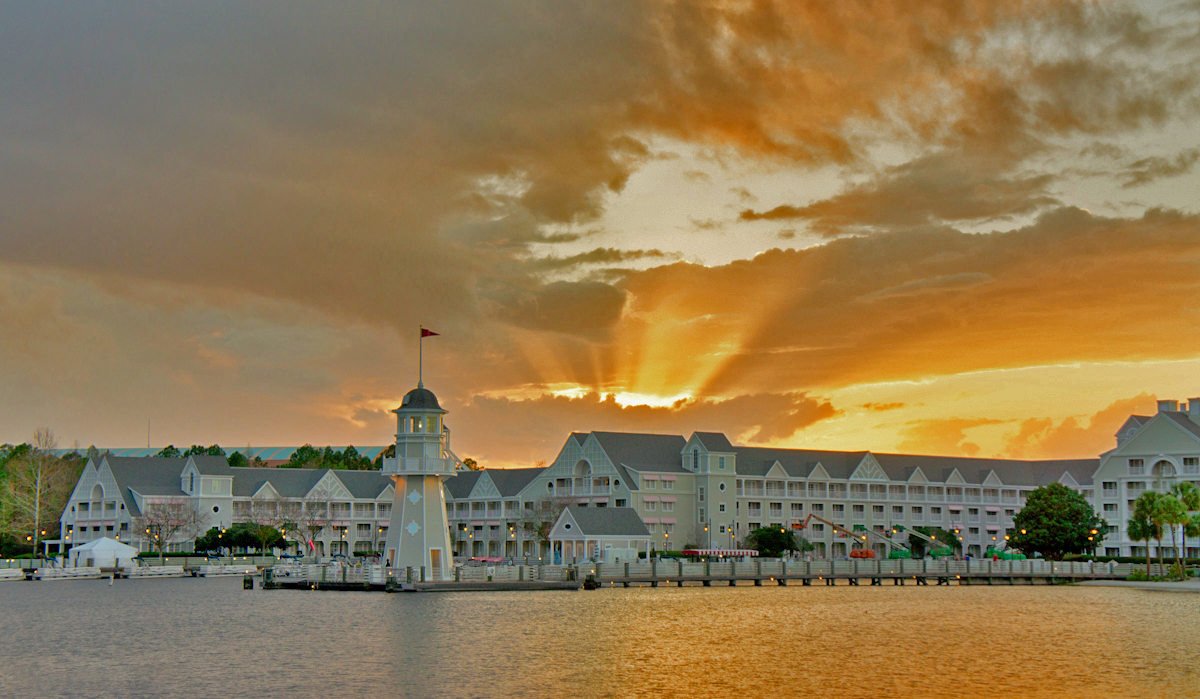
- Sunrise over Disney's Yacht Club Resort
- Interactive map of the Disney's Yacht Club Resort area

General information
- Type: Resort
- Location: Epcot Resort Area
- Opened: November 5, 1990

Other information
- Number of rooms: 630

Website
- Official website

Disney's Yacht Club Resort is a New England nautical-themed resort located at the Walt Disney World Resort in Bay Lake, Florida. First opened on November 5, 1990, it is one of the several Epcot Area Resorts. Disney's Yacht Club is located next to a sister resort, Disney's Beach Club Resort, and across Crescent Lake from Disney's BoardWalk Resort. The resort is owned and operated by Disney Parks, Experiences and Products. It was designed by Robert A.M. Stern Architects.

== Resort features ==
Disney's Yacht and Beach Club resorts share resources, including staff and management. Boat transportation from both of the resorts run to Epcot and Disney's Hollywood Studios, as well as the BoardWalk and the Walt Disney World Swan & Walt Disney World Dolphin resorts. The resort is about five minutes walking distance from Epcot and roughly 15 minutes walking distance to Disney's Hollywood Studios. Guests are allowed to use the International Gateway entrance to Epcot through the World Showcase between the France and the UK Pavilions.

The Yacht Club is home to a 73,000-square-foot (6,800 m^{2}) Convention Center shared with the Beach Club.
