= Von Roll Holding =

Swiss infrastructure company

Von Roll Holding AG
- Type: Public (Aktiengesellschaft)
- Traded as: SIX: ROL
- Industry: metal industry
- Founded: 1803
- Headquarters: Breitenbach, Canton of Solothurn, Switzerland
- Key people: Dr. Christian Hennerkes (CEO); Dr. Peter Kalantzis (chairman); Artur Lust (CFO); Claudia Güntert (head of corporate communications)
- Number of employees: 1,536 (31 December 2017)
- Website: vonroll.com

Von Roll Holding AG is a Swiss industrial group that operates worldwide that was founded in 1803. As one of Switzerland's longest-established industrial companies, Von Roll focuses today on products and systems for electrical applications such as power generation, transmission, and storage as well as e-mobility and industrial applications. It made gondola systems, monorails, and funicular systems at attractions in various countries.

== History ==
Von Roll has its roots in the Eisenwerke der Handelsgesellschaft der Gebrüder Dürholz & Co. (Ironworks of the commercial firm of the Brothers Dürholz & Co.) which was established in 1803. This firm was then taken over in 1810 by Von Roll & Cie, newly formed by Ludwig Freiherr von Roll (1771–1839) and Jakob von Glutz. In May 1823, Ludwig von Roll founded the Gesellschaft der Ludwig von Roll'schen Eisenwerke which benefited from industrialization and railroad construction that demanded a lot of iron.

Von Roll participated in the construction of the Wetterhorn Elevator in 1908.

The business developed into one of the most important industrial groups in Switzerland with more than 10,000 employees in the 1970s. Like other Swiss companies, Von Roll suffered during the oil crisis of 1973. The company underwent financial restructuring after financial restructuring, seemingly without end. As recently as 2003, Von Roll had to fight for its survival. At the end of 2002, following the accumulated losses of previous years, Von Roll's equity capital had shrunk to 10.3 million. In 2004 the company initiated a new strategy to focus on the insulation business, beginning its turnaround.

The main shareholder is in early 2019 August von Finck Jr. family with above 65% of the quotes. After the conversion of some convertible bonds in December 2018 the composition of shareholders became unclear. In 2019 the company is involved in law case for some salaries paid in euro (€).

== Von Roll Seilbahnen AG ==
Von Roll Seilbahnen AG was the aerial tramway and cableway division that was sold to Austrian manufacturer Doppelmayr in 1996.

=== Products ===
Perhaps Von Roll's best-known product was the type 101 sky ride or simply "VR101" that operated in many amusement parks. A total of over 100 were installed. As of 2008, only ten remained operational. On 30 December 1954 Felseneggbahn was opened. It was built by Von Roll in seven months for one million Swiss francs. It still runs, and on 31 March 2010, it carried its 10 millionth passenger. The Disneyland Skyway was Von Roll's first aerial ropeway in the United States. It opened on 23 June 1956 and closed on 9 November 1994. The first Von Roll VR101 was built in Flims, in 1944, and replaced in 1986.

=== Operating Von Roll Type 101s ===
Ride name	Opened	Park name	Location	Notes	Ref
Krupka-Komáří Sky Ride	1952	Lanová Dráha Krupka	Krupka, Czech Republic	The last VR101 Sidechair lift in the world, not to be replaced for a long time. Received historical status. The oldest and longest-serving detachable monocable ropeway in history.	
Skyride	1962	Cedar Point	Sandusky, Ohio	Uses former Frontier Lift cabins.	
Skyride	1962	Superland	Rishon LeZion, Israel		
Skyride	1964	Minnesota State Fair	Falcon Heights, Minnesota		
Bayside Skyride	1967	SeaWorld San Diego	San Diego, California	Round-trip ride.	
Skyfari	1969	San Diego Zoo	San Diego, California		
Skyride	1974	Busch Gardens Tampa	Tampa, Florida		
Sky Lift	1974	Taman Safari	Bogor, Indonesia		
Aeronaut Skyride	1975	Busch Gardens Williamsburg	Williamsburg, Virginia	3 stations, all one-way.	
Delta Flyer / Eagle's Flight	1976	California's Great America	Santa Clara, California		
Skyride	1980	Washington State Fair	Puyallup, Washington	Originally built for the 1962 Seattle World's Fair.	
Cableway	1995	National Coffee Park	Quindío Department, Columbia	Combination ride of Bronx Zoo and Knoxville World's Fair rides.	

=== Former Von Roll Type 101s ===
Ride Name	Opened	Closed	Park Name	Location	Notes	Ref
Alpine Swiss Skyride	1963	1994	Aquarena Springs	San Marcos, Texas	Closed in 1994, removed in 2013.	
Jennerbahn	1953	2017	Berchtesgaden National Park	Berchtesgaden, Bavaria, Germany	Replaced by a modern 10-passenger gondola. The second-to-last VR101 in Europe. Original chairs replaced in the 1970s - 1980's with gondola cabins.	
Astrolift	1967	1981	Six Flags Over Georgia	Austell, Georgia	Cabins used for Sky Buckets.	
Astrolift	1961	1981	Six Flags Over Texas	Arlington, Texas	Removed over safety concerns.	
Astroway	1968	2005	Six Flags AstroWorld	Houston, Texas	Demolished along with the park, some parts and cabins moved to Six Flags Over Georgia and Six Flags Great Adventure, while others were auctioned off.	
Brussels World's Fair Skyride	1960	1976	Lakeland	Memphis, Tennessee		
Delta Flyer / Eagle's Flight	1976	1984	Six Flags Great America	Gurnee, Illinois	Cabins moved to Six Flags Great Adventure.	
Frontier Lift	1968	1985	Cedar Point	Sandusky, Ohio	Cabins used on Skyride, removed for Iron Dragon.	
Gondola Skyride	1982	????	World's Fair 1982	Knoxville, Tennessee	Relocated to Parque Nacional del Café.	
Lake Louise Gondola	1959	2019	Lake Louise	Lake Louise, Alberta, Canada	Built in 1959.	
New England Sky Way	1973	2014	Six Flags New England	Agawam, Massachusetts	Built in 1963 at Coney Island (Brooklyn, NY); removed to build Wicked Cyclone.	
Ocean Skyway	1958	1967	Pacific Ocean Park	Santa Monica, California	Relocated to Legend City (Phoenix, AZ) as Sky Ride.	
Tucson Mining Company Ore Buckets	1960	1964	Freedomland USA	Bronx, New York	Towers were later used at Great Adventure, Jackson, NJ; believed that the buckets were from the 1958 Brussels World's Fair.	
Satellite	1968	1983	Legend City	Phoenix, Arizona		
Sky Buckets	1968	2020	Six Flags Over Georgia	Austell, Georgia	Cabins moved to Six Flags Great Adventure.	
Skyfari	1972	2009	Bronx Zoo	Bronx, New York	Relocated to Parque Nacional del Café.	
Skyride	1964	1999	Brackenridge Park	San Antonio, Texas	Closed in 1999, removed in 2002 due to maintenance costs.	
Skyride	1965	1971	Coney Island	Cincinnati, Ohio	Relocated to Kings Island.	
Skyride	1968	????	Hemisfair '68	San Antonio, Texas	Continued operation after fair closure.	
Skyride	1972	1979	Kings Island	Mason, Ohio	Relocated from Coney Island (Cincinnati, OH).	
Skyride	1967	1996	La Ronde	Montreal, Quebec, Canada	Built for 1967 World's Fair, demolished; only boarding-station platform remains.	
Skyride	1972	1997	Opryland	Nashville, Tennessee	Parts moved to Six Flags New England.	
Skyride	1966	1975	Pirates World	Dania, Florida		
Skyride	1965	2023	Tulsa State Fairgrounds	Tulsa, Oklahoma	The Tulsa Skyride ran from 1971 to 2006 at Bell's Amusement Park. After Bell's closed, it was then run by the county during state fairs until 2019. In 2023 it was dismantled and sold to GT Amusement Service, an Iraq based company who states they plan to refurbish and re-open it in the United Arab Emirates	
Skyway	1956	1994	Disneyland	Anaheim, California	Removed due to stress cracks in Matterhorn battery.	
Skyway	1971	1999	Magic Kingdom	Lake Buena Vista, Florida		
Skyway	1983	1998	Tokyo Disneyland	Urayasu, Chiba, Japan		
Skyway	1974	2024	Six Flags Great Adventure	Jackson Township, New Jersey	Originally built for the 1964 World's Fair in Queens. Parts moved to Cedar Point, One of the cabins moved to Kings Dominion for shelving.	
Sky-Way	1971	1981	Six Flags St. Louis	Eureka, Missouri	Accident on 26 July 1978 killed 3 and seriously injured 1. Cabins moved to Six Flags AstroWorld.	
Southern Cross	1977	1983	Six Flags Great America	Gurnee, Illinois	Cabins moved to Six Flags Great Adventure.	
Space Ride	1963	1967	Riverview Park	Chicago, Illinois		
Swiss Skyride	1964	1979	Fair Park/State Fair of Texas	Dallas, Texas	Removed after accident, 1 killed.	
Union 76 Skyride	1962	1980	Century 21 Exposition	Seattle, Washington	Ran at Seattle Center, relocated to Washington State Fair.	
Sky Hi	1973	1987	Worlds of Fun	Kansas City, Missouri		

=== Monorail ===
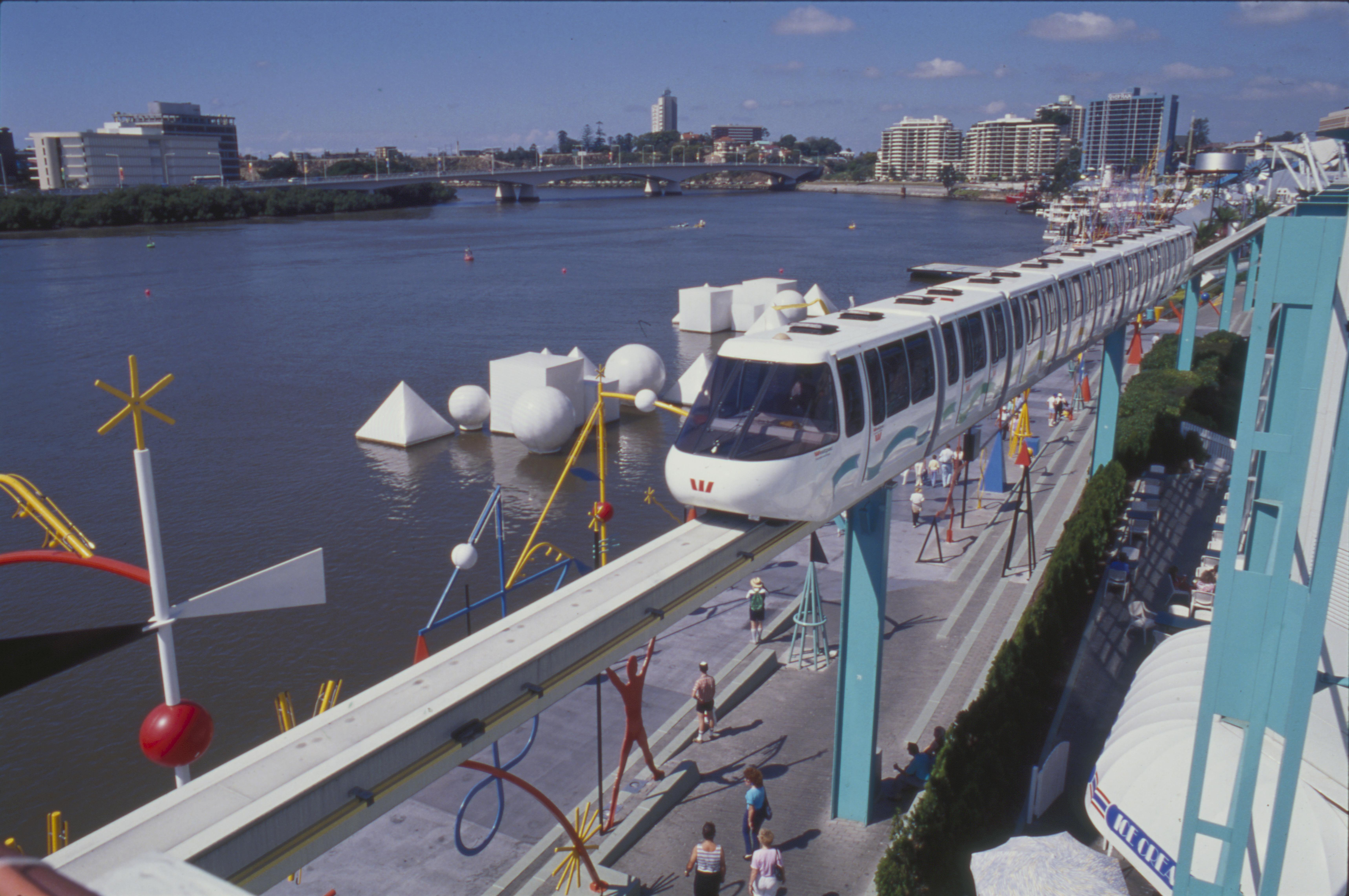
Von Roll MkII monorail at World Expo 88

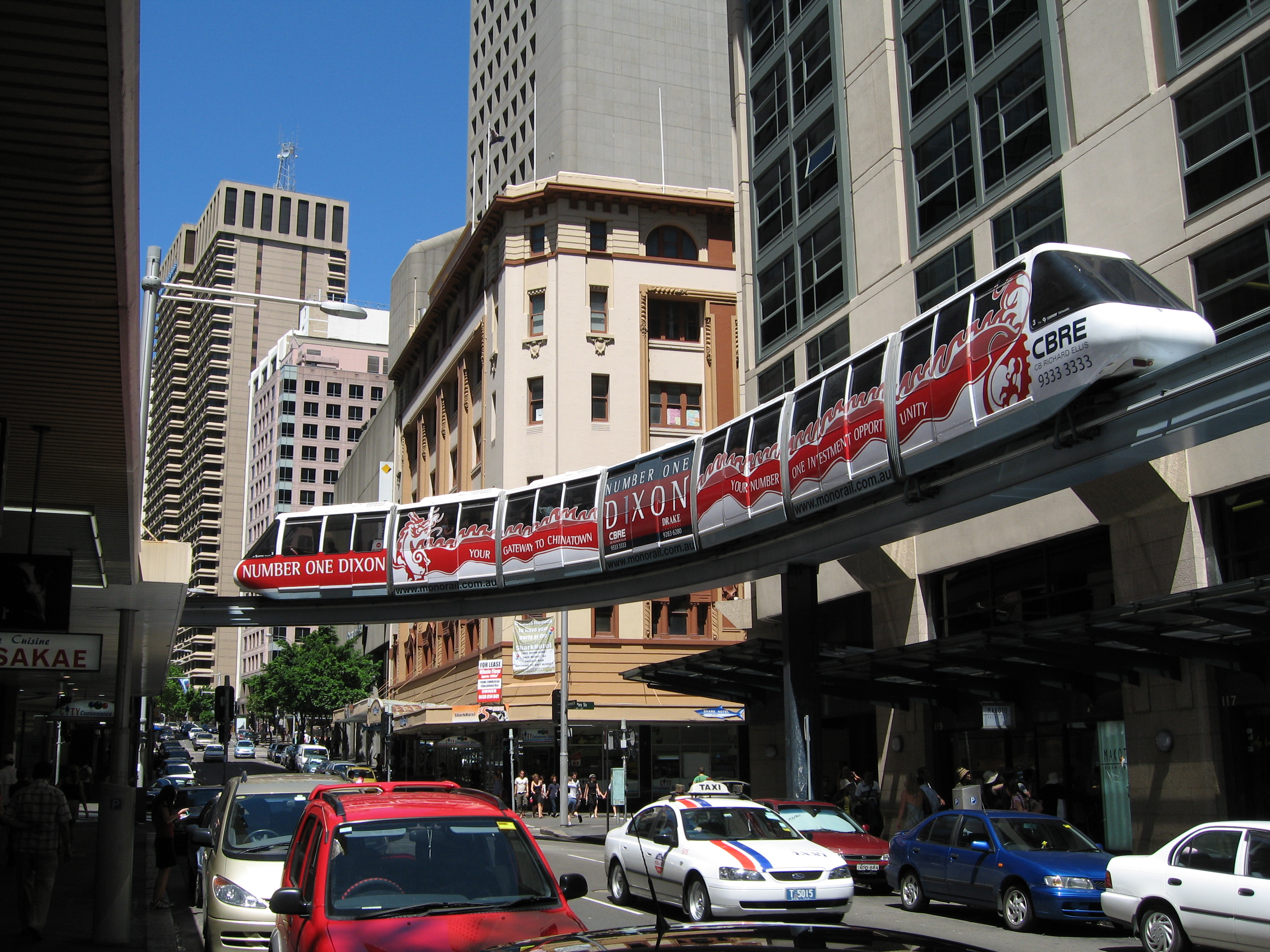
Von Roll MkIII Sydney Monorail which closed in 2013.

The Mk II and Mk III monorail automated people mover (APM) systems were installed in a variety of locations before the technology was sold to Adtranz (later Bombardier), which continues to supply the parts for the monorail systems.

AirTrain Newark opened in 1996 and is a Von Roll system. The AirTrain Newark system was extended to connect with Amtrak and NJ Transit in 2001. The current system is expected to be fully replaced by 2030.

The monorail cars at Alton Towers theme park in England were built for Expo 86 in Vancouver, British Columbia, Canada.

Von Roll also manufactured the old Sentosa Monorail in Sentosa Island, Singapore, in 1982, which closed down in March 2005.

The Jurong Bird Park Panorail in Jurong Bird Park, Singapore is a four-car straddle-beam monorail that began operation in 1991 and ceased operations in 2012.

Australia has had a total of four Von Roll Monorail systems, all of which are now retired. For example, a Von Roll MkII system at Sea World theme park on the Gold Coast (first monorail in Australia which opened in 1986). A MkIII Monorail system in nearby Broadbeach linking Oasis Shopping Centre to Jupiter's Hotel & Casino opened in 1989, but closed on 29 January 2017 due to life-expired equipment and declining patronage. Another MkIII Monorail system, the Sydney Monorail, operated in Australia linking the City Centre to Darling Harbour, began operation on 21 July 1988 and due to a lack of spare parts it ceased operation on 30 June 2013. A MkII Monorail system was also in operation during World Expo 88 held in Brisbane, Australia, with a loop around the expo site at Southbank. After Expo it was dismantled and three of the four trains were sold back to Von Roll for use at Europa-Park in Germany; the fourth train and some of the track was sold to Sea World.

=== Space Towers ===
Cedar Point's Space Spiral, Astro World's Astro needle and Coney's Space Tower were built by Willy Bühler Space Towers Company of Berne, Switzerland, with cabins by Von Roll. In 1971 Intamin started marketing these towers and contracted these same companies to build them. Willy Bühler Space Towers was eventually acquired by Von Roll.

== Funicular systems ==
- Falls Incline Railway, Niagara Falls, Ontario, Canada, 1966

== See also ==
- Von Roll rack system
- List of aerial lift manufacturers
