= Disney Skyliner =

Gondola lift system at Walt Disney World

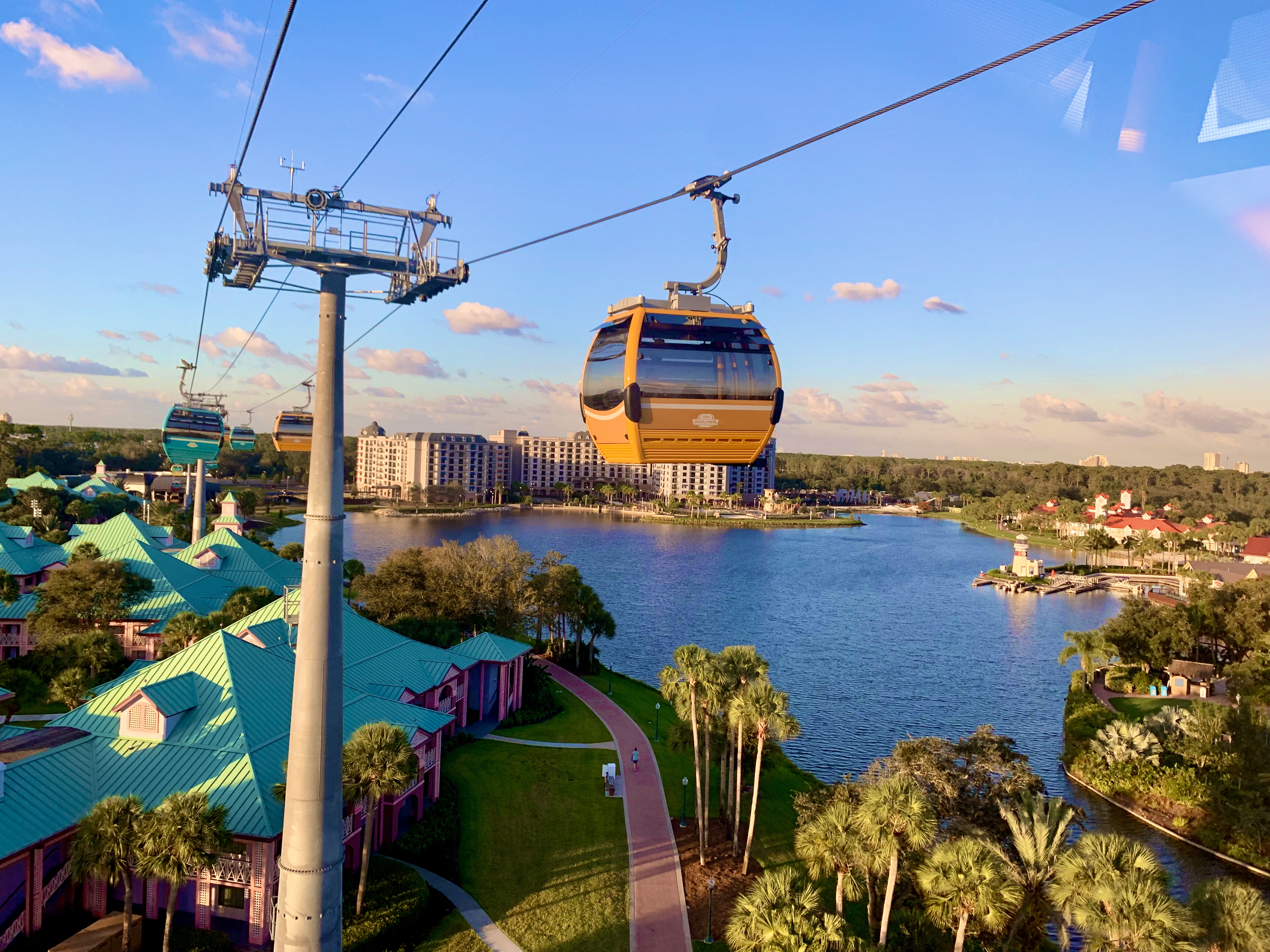
- Disney Skyliner cabins over Disney's Caribbean Beach Resort, with Disney's Riviera Resort in the background
- Interactive map of Disney Skyliner

Overview
- System: Disney Transport
- Location: Walt Disney World; Bay Lake, Florida
- Country: United States
- Coordinates: 28.35910°N 81.54495°W
- Termini: Caribbean Beach Resort (hub)
- Elevation: lowest: 3 ft (0.91 m) highest: 60 ft (18 m)
- No. of stations: 5 (Note: An additional turn station sits next to the parking lot and tennis courts of Disney's BoardWalk Resort.)
- Services: Epcot; Disney's Riviera Resort; Disney's Caribbean Beach Resort; Disney's Hollywood Studios; Disney's Art of Animation Resort / Disney's Pop Century Resort
- Built by: Buena Vista Construction Company
- Construction begin: 2017
- Open: September 29, 2019
- Website: disneyworld.disney.go.com/guest-services/disney-skyliner/

Operation
- Owner: The Walt Disney Company
- Operator: Disney Transport (Disney Experiences)
- No. of carriers: 250+ CWA Omega IV
- Carrier capacity: 10 passengers per cabin; 6 passengers per cabin with wheelchair or other mobility device
- Operating times: Open: 1 hour before earliest park opening; Close: 1.5 hours after latest park closing
- Trip duration: 11 min. (Riviera, Epcot); 5 min. (Hollywood Studios); 4 min. (Art of Animation / Pop Century)
- Fare: Free

Technical features
- Aerial lift type: Mono-cable gondola detachable
- Manufactured by: Doppelmayr USA
- Line length: Approx. 3 mi (4,800 m)
- No. of support towers: 48
- No. of cables: 5
- Operating speed: 11 mph (18 km/h)

The Disney Skyliner is a gondola lift system, part of the Disney Transport system, that opened on September 29, 2019, at the Walt Disney World Resort in Bay Lake, Florida. The system is composed of five stations that serve four resorts and two theme parks, with a fleet of over 250 gondola cabins that can accommodate up to ten guests per cabin, or up to six with an open wheelchair or other mobility device. Guests sit on twin, inward-facing, wooden benches.

== Predecessors ==
Almost a year after Disneyland opened in Anaheim, the Skyway, a gondola lift system, opened at the park on June 23, 1956, connecting Fantasyland and Tomorrowland. Magic Kingdom followed suit and built a Skyway, connecting the same lands when Walt Disney World opened on October 1, 1971, as well as Tokyo Disneyland on opening day, April 15, 1983.

The Disneyland Skyway closed on November 4, 1994, due to metal fatigue on one of its support towers, located inside the Matterhorn Bobsleds, which could not be repaired unless the latter's enclosed mountain was cut open. The Tokyo Disneyland Skyway closed on November 3, 1998, and the Magic Kingdom Skyway closed on November 10, 1999.

== History ==
On February 15, 2017, the Reedy Creek Improvement District filed plans with the South Florida Water Management District for "various improvements." Among these plans was a design for a 100-foot-high (30 m) building in the shape of a "V," consistent with a gondola lift changing direction. The blueprints described improvements to the South end of Epcot at the World Showcase, as well as in Disney's BoardWalk Resort and Disney's Hollywood Studios. These V-shaped structures were also planned for Disney's Caribbean Beach Resort, Disney's Pop Century Resort and Disney's Art of Animation Resort.

The gondola lift plan was confirmed by Disney Parks, Experiences and Products at the D23 Expo on July 15, 2017, detailing the system connecting four hotels, including the upcoming Disney's Riviera Resort, with Epcot and Disney's Hollywood Studios, affording "a bird's-eye view" of the area.

By 2018, the Disney Skyliner was already under construction. The towers and stations were more than halfway completed by summer 2018. In November 2018, Disney Parks announced that the Disney Skyliner would open in fall 2019. Testing with passenger cabins began in late January 2019, on the Hollywood Studios line.

The Disney Skyliner system opened on September 29, 2019.

== Routes ==
=== Riviera and Epcot line ===
The Epcot line is the longest and most complex of the three lines. Departing North from the Caribbean Beach hub, the line rises up to cross over the Jamaica and Aruba villages of the resort, before descending to a mid-station at the Riviera Resort, which is accessible from and adjacent to the Aruba village of Caribbean Beach. At the station, the line turns West and travels alongside Buena Vista Drive. As it reaches the Disney's BoardWalk Resort, the line reaches its turning station and resumes traveling North. The line then passes over the France pavilion at Epcot before descending into its International Gateway terminus.

The travel time between Caribbean Beach and Riviera takes 3 minutes, while the travel time between Riviera and Epcot takes 9 minutes.

=== Hollywood Studios line ===
The Hollywood Studios line departs from the Caribbean Beach hub, headed West. The first part of the line cuts through slash pine forest, before crossing over Hollywood Studios's parking lot before its final descent.

The travel time on the Hollywood Studios line is 5 minutes.

=== Art of Animation / Pop Century line ===
The Art of Animation / Pop Century line is the shortest of the three routes. This line heads South from the Caribbean Beach hub towards the Art of Animation and Pop Century resorts. The first half of the line travels over reclaimed swampland, and the second half travels over Hourglass Lake.

Travel time on the Art of Animation / Pop Century line takes 4 minutes.

== Operation ==
The Disney Skyliner uses the D-Line detachable monocable technology from Doppelmayr. The Austrian company is also the maintenance contractor for the Skyliner. It is only the second D-Line system in the Americas after the Big Sky Resort’s Ramcharger 8, which opened just months before the Skyliner.

The Disney Skyliner typically begins operations an hour before early entry begins at EPCOT and Hollywood Studios, and ceases operations ninety minutes after the parks close. The system is closed when lightning is nearby or when strong winds are measured. When this happens, buses are dispatched to serve the affected resorts.

=== Stations ===
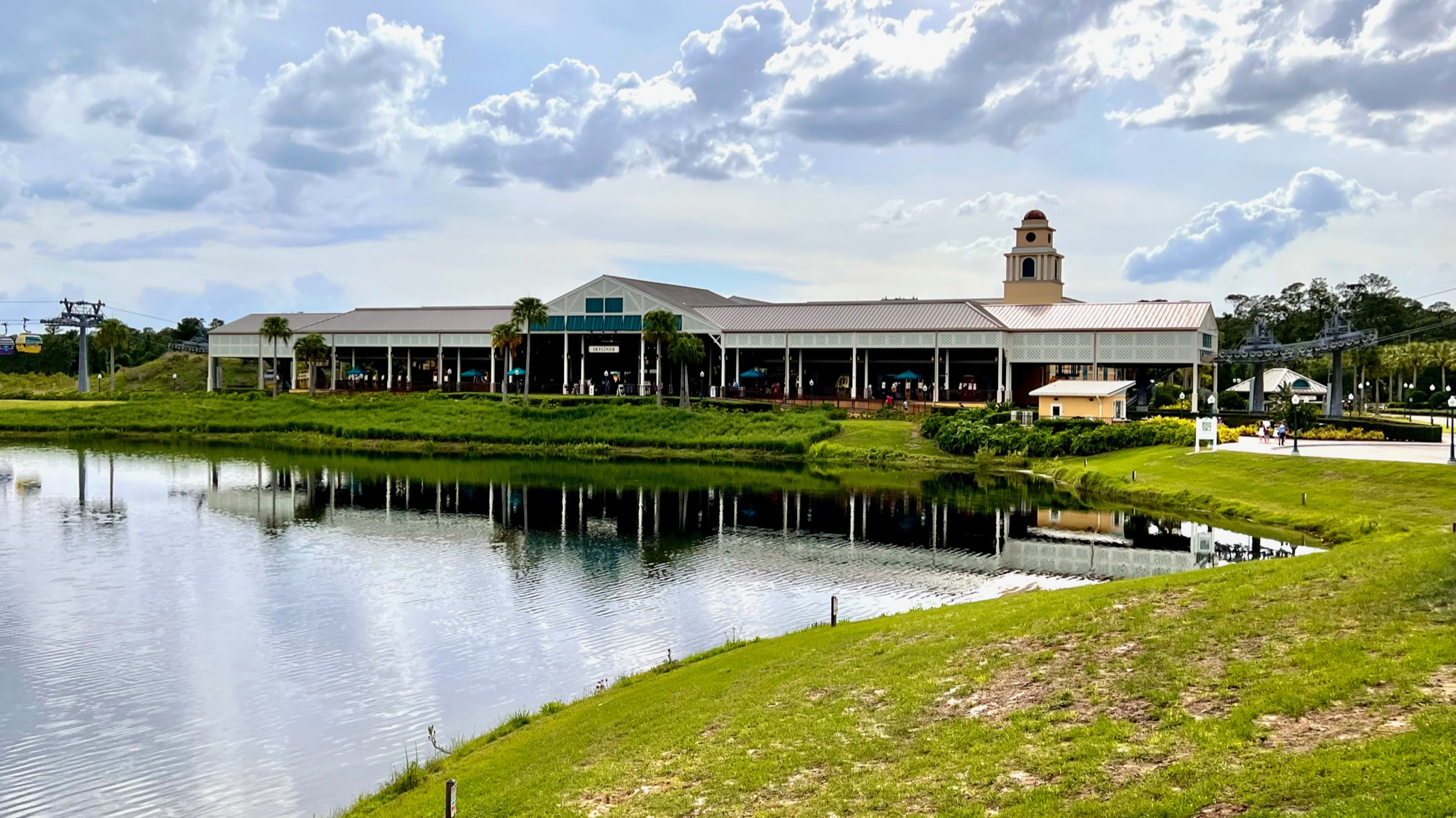
Disney's Caribbean Beach Resort station, the hub of the Disney Skyliner system.

Caribbean Beach is the hub of the system. The drive wheels for all three lines are located at the station along with parking rails for cabins not in active use.

At the end terminals of each line, most cabins unload their guests at the primary unload platform and then turn around before loading guests on primary loading platform on the opposite side.

For passengers with mobility issues, including those using a wheelchair or other mobility devices, their cabin is routed to a secondary unloading platform where it will remain stationary; this service is available at all stations except Riviera. Cabins then rejoin the main conveyor of gondola cabins. The Disney Skyliner is the only gondola system in North America to include separate stationary loading and unloading platforms at each station.

=== Cabins ===
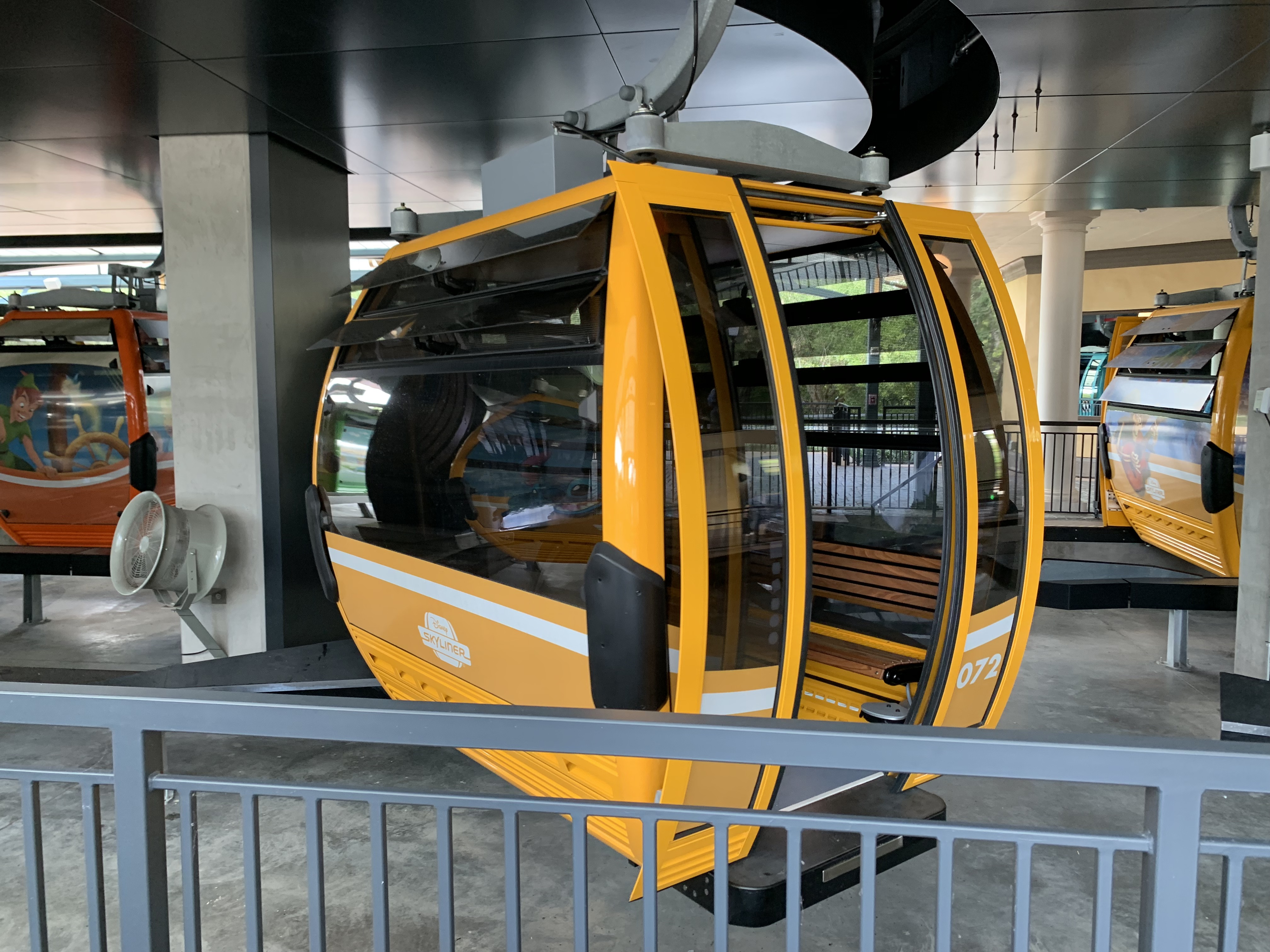
A Disney Skyliner cabin at the Epcot station on the terminus of the Epcot line.

The line has nearly 300 Omega IV model cabins, built by CWA Constructions, a subsidiary of Doppelmayr. Inside, guests sit on twin, inward-facing, wooden benches; strollers measuring 30 in × 48 in (76 cm × 122 cm) or smaller are able to roll directly into the gondola without having to be folded.

Cabins have indirect LED lighting of the floor and a speaker for announcements and recorded information for passengers, both powered by a battery onboard, which is recharged when in stations. Adding power-intensive air conditioners to each cabin would be unfeasible, so to maintain a comfortable temperature in the tropical climates, the glass on each cabin has reflective glazing and there are numerous windows and vents to create cross ventilation when in motion. When stopped for an extended period, gondolas can get hot and the battery for lighting could be depleted. To address these issues, each cabin has an emergency kit stocked with glow sticks, instant cold packs and water. There are also emergency call boxes in each cabin.

Selected Skyliner cabins feature exterior designs with characters from Mickey Mouse, Disney Animation, Pixar, Star Wars, Guardians of the Galaxy, and The Muppets as well as Walt Disney World attractions The Haunted Mansion and Pirates of the Caribbean. With over 250 cabins in operation, each one features onboard audio, which is unique to each of the three routes. Each cabin has wooden bench-style seating that fits a maximum of 10 people, 5 per bench, while strollers that measure up to 30 in × 48 in (76 cm × 122 cm) can roll directly into the gondolas without being folded; accessible gondolas can accommodate up to 6 people with an open wheelchair or mobility device.

== Incidents ==
The Disney Skyliner can experience delays and full stops of each of its three lines, which are usually reset either immediately or within 20 minutes, depending on the cause of the stop. In more serious circumstances, such as delays of over 20 minutes, where a line is no longer suitable for normal operation and transport, they are kept running until all guests have been escorted out of the gondolas upon reaching the unloading platform at each station. Under extreme circumstances, evacuations can be conducted by Reedy Creek Fire Department if a line shuts down and service cannot be reset or restarted. Gravel access roads were built under all over-land portions of the route to position aerial platform vehicles for the evacuation processes, while a specialized barge was built to reach the height of the gondolas overwater at Hourglass Lake.

On October 5, 2019, a gondola became jammed at the Riviera Resort station, just before taking off for Epcot. A subsequent backlog of gondolas ensued and got stuck behind the jammed gondola inside the station. There were no known injuries, but the Epcot line was closed for the remainder of the night. On April 22, 2021, a second collision occurred with two gondolas collided at the Hollywood Studios station; no injuries were reported and the system resumed operation after an inspection by Doppelmayr. A third collision occurred on June 8, 2021, at the Epcot station, also between two gondolas.

== Gallery ==
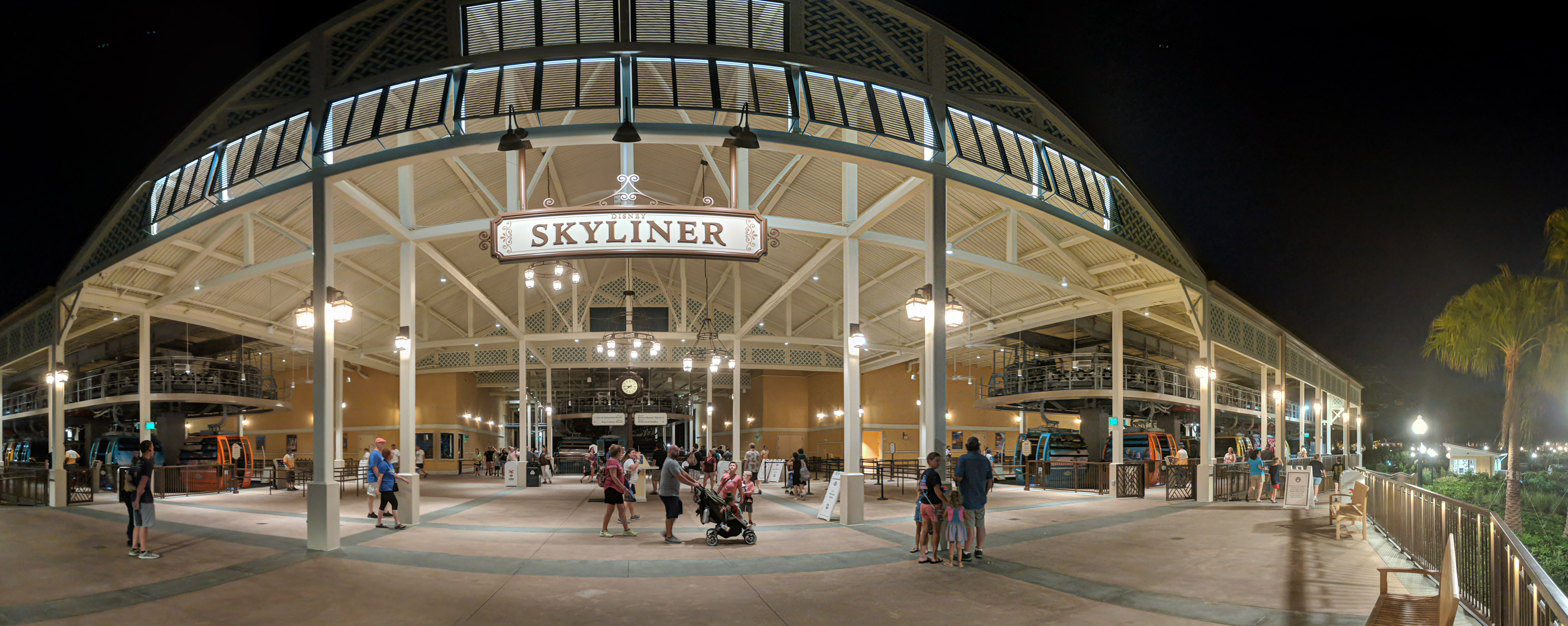
Caribbean Beach Resort station, the hub of the Skyliner

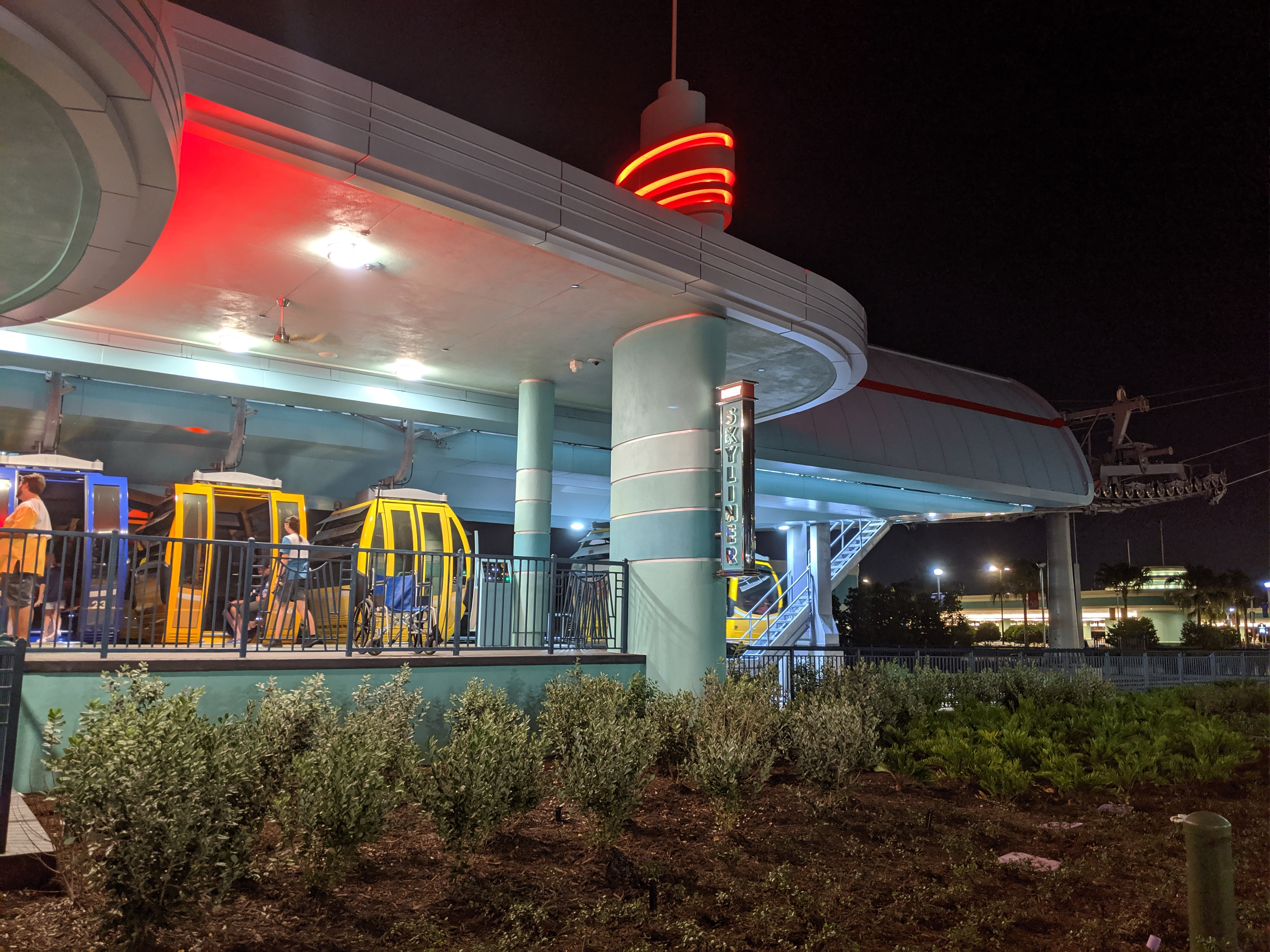
Disney's Hollywood Studios station

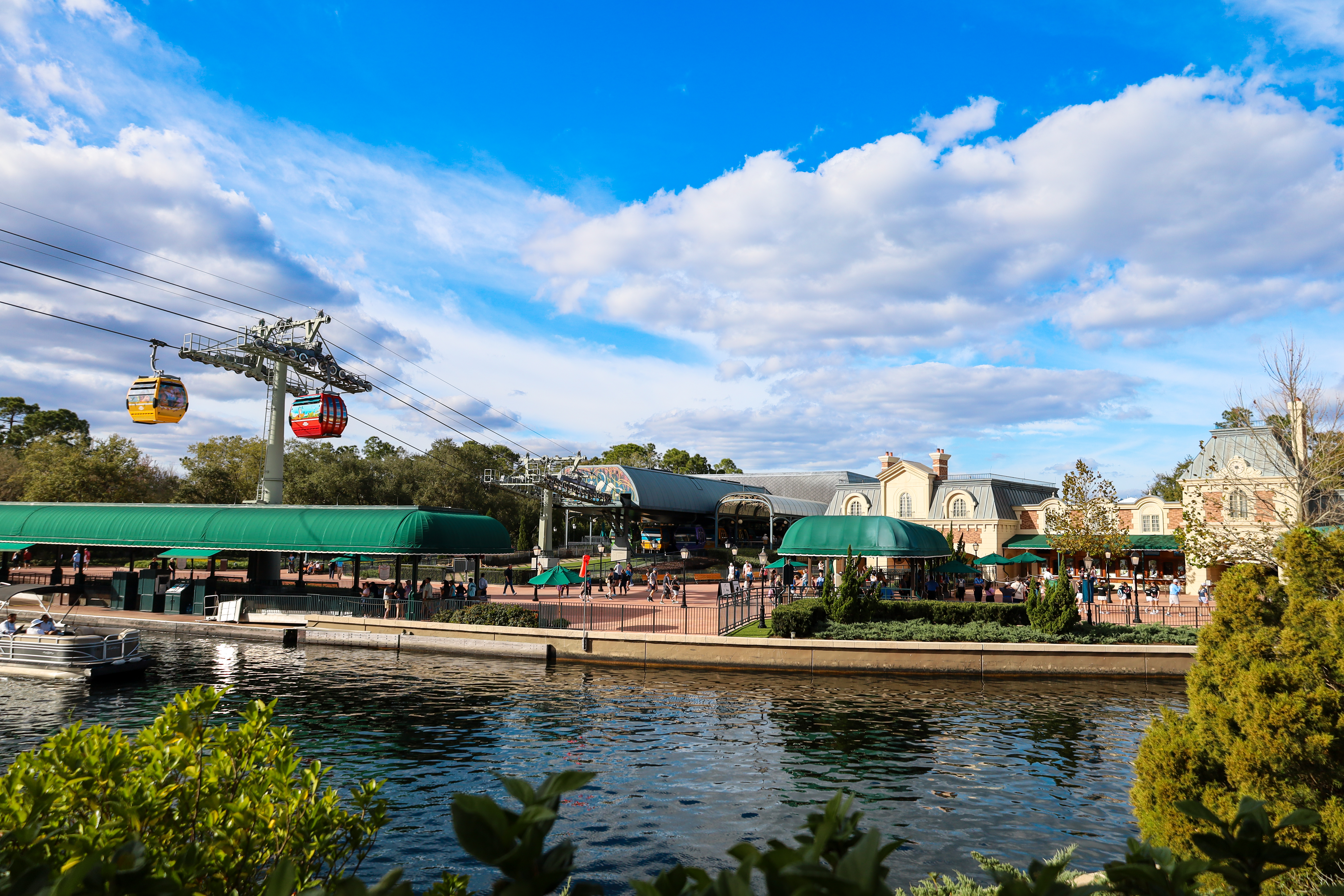
Epcot station at the International Gateway entrance

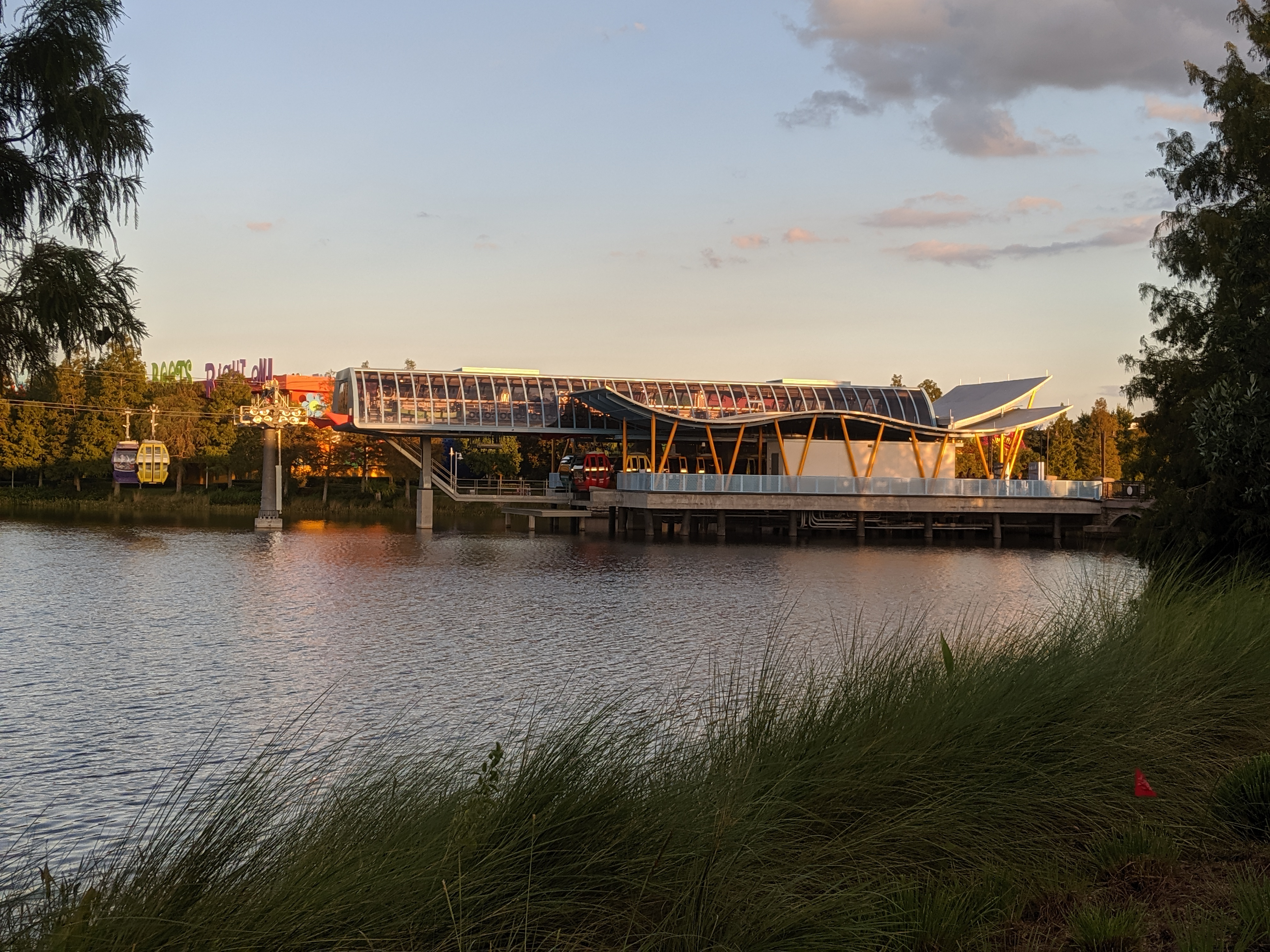
Art of Animation/Pop Century resorts station, located in the middle of Hourglass Lake

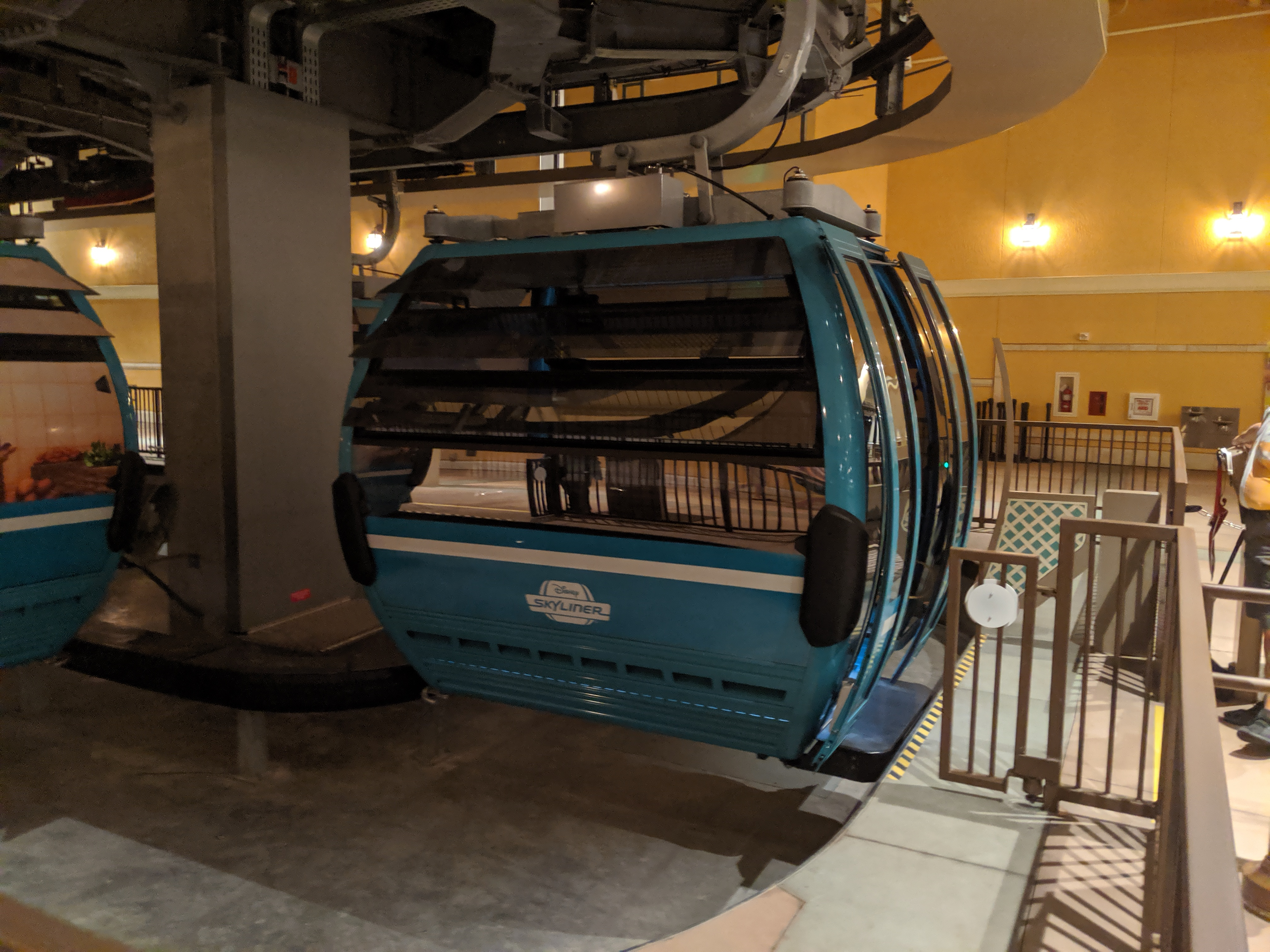
Cabin at the accessible stationary loading area

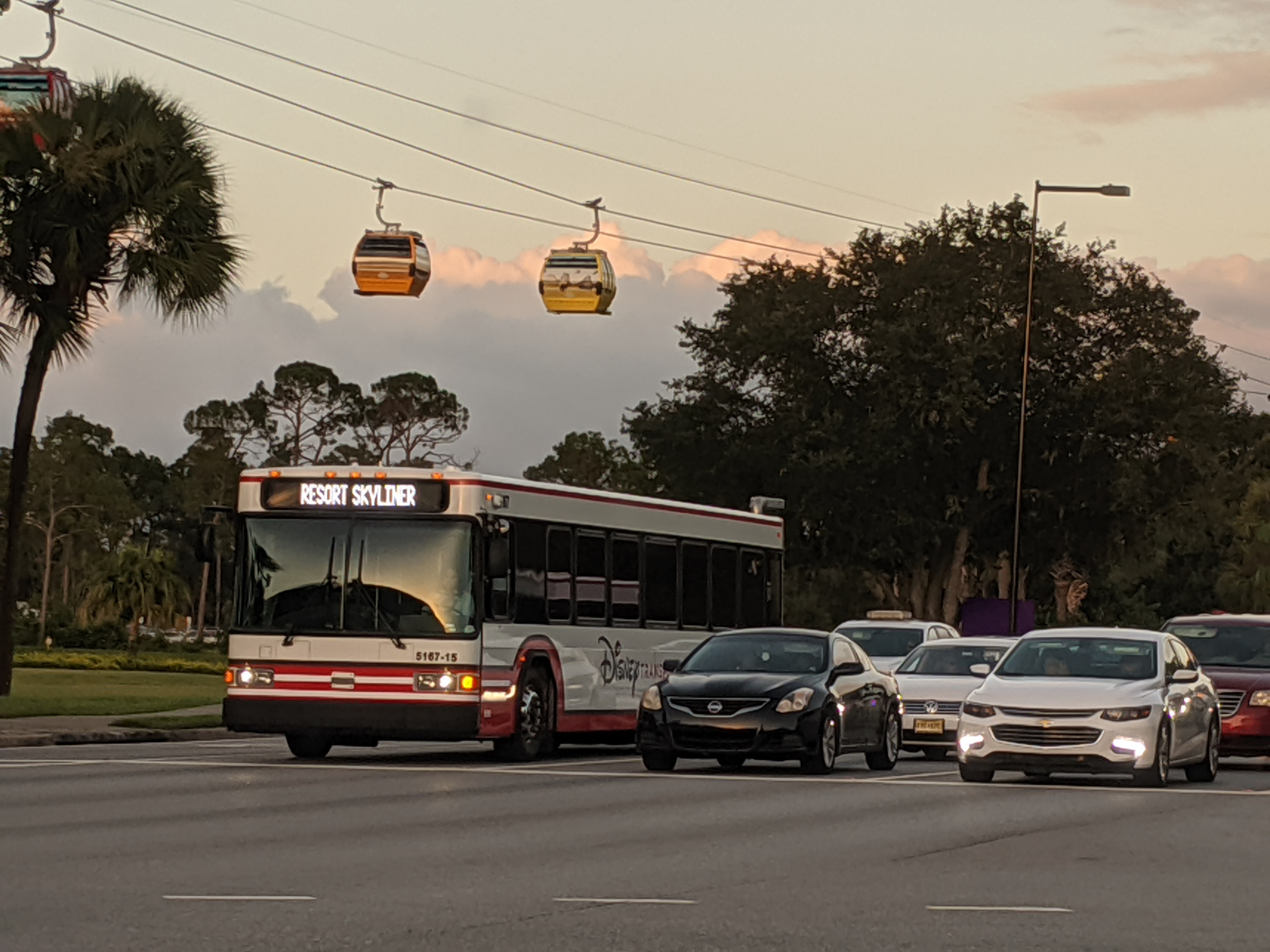
Disney Transport bus operating during Skyliner service suspension

== See also ==
- Disney Transport
