= Disney's BoardWalk Resort =

Hotel at Walt Disney World

Coordinates: 28°22′02″N 81°33′23″W

Disney's BoardWalk

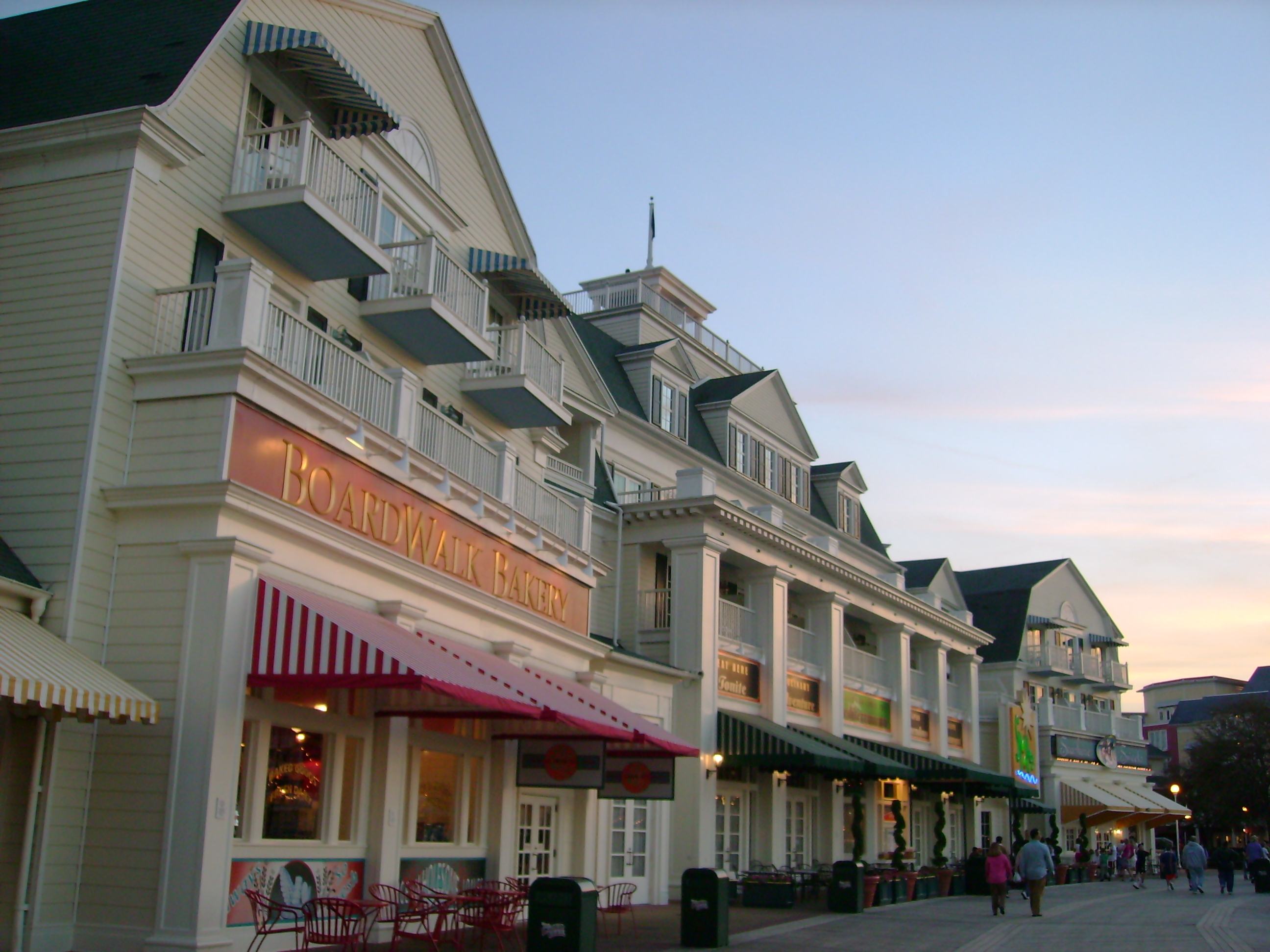
- The eponymous boardwalk as seen in January 2007.
- Interactive map of the Disney's BoardWalk area

General information
- Type: Resort
- Location: Epcot Resort Area
- Opened: July 1, 1996
- Operator: Disney Experiences

Other information
- Number of rooms: 378

Website
- Official website

Disney's BoardWalk is a hotel and entertainment complex at the Walt Disney World resort in Bay Lake, Florida, near Orlando. First opened in 1996, the BoardWalk Resort is located in the Epcot Resort Area, alongside Crescent Lake, between Epcot and Disney's Hollywood Studios. The resort is owned and operated by Disney Experiences. The Inn and the villas share a common lobby with the rest of the resort. The Inn, Atlantic Dance Hall, and other features of the boardwalk were designed by Robert A.M. Stern Architects.

== Description ==
=== Entertainment district ===
The entertainment district at BoardWalk lies along a 0.25-mile-long (0.40 km) boardwalk, reminiscent of Coney Island in New York or Atlantic City, New Jersey. Several restaurants are present on the BoardWalk.

- Dining: Disney's BoardWalk Inn offers the following dining options both on the boardwalk and inside the resort:
  - Big River Grille & Brewing Works – On the Villas side of the boardwalk (closed in January 2024)
  - BoardWalk Deli – Sandwich deli, which replaced BoardWalk Bakery in 2022.
  - Flying Fish – A seafood restaurant on the Inn side of the boardwalk.
  - Trattoria al Forno – A restaurant featuring Italian cuisine.
  - BoardWalk Ice Cream – Operating in the former ESPN Yard Arcade/ESPN Club Store building on the Inn side of the boardwalk, this replaced the closed Ample Hills Creamery in 2021.
  - Pizza Window – Located next to Trattoria al Forno.
  - The Cake Bake Shop by Gwendolyn Rogers – Located at the old ESPN.
- Shopping: Disney's BoardWalk offers many shopping options, both on the boardwalk and inside the resort.
- Pools: Disney's BoardWalk has two dedicated pools. The feature pool at Disney's BoardWalk is the Luna Park Pool, which is themed after a 1920s–1940s carnival with the 200-foot (61 m) Keister Coaster Water Slide and a play area for young children. The other "quiet pool" is located near Community Hall at the villas.
- Recreation: Other recreational activities at Disney's BoardWalk Villas include bike rentals and tennis courts.
- Nightlife:
  - Atlantic Dance Hall – Located at the far end of the villas on the boardwalk.
  - Abracadabar – Located next to Trattoria Al Forno, Abracadabar serves drinks with entertainment from a magician.

=== Inn ===
One of Walt Disney World's "deluxe resorts," BoardWalk Inn contains decor inspired by the seaside districts of the Northeastern United States during the 20th century. The Inn is a short walk or FriendShip boat ride from the other resorts around Crescent Lake, as well as Epcot and Disney's Hollywood Studios. It is located directly across the lake from Disney's Yacht and Beach Club resorts.
