= Disney's Caribbean Beach Resort =

Hotel at Walt Disney World

Coordinates: 28°21′45.05″N 81°32′33.61″W

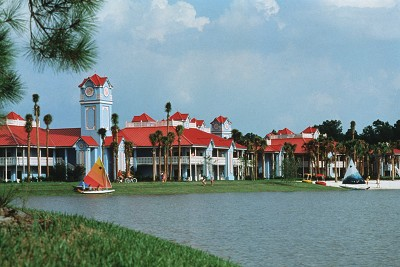
- Martinique section of Disney's Caribbean Beach Resort
- Interactive map of the Disney's Caribbean Beach Resort area

General information
- Type: Resort
- Location: Epcot Resort Area
- Opened: October 1, 1988

Other information
- Number of rooms: 1,536

Website
- Official website

Disney's Caribbean Beach Resort is a resort located within the Walt Disney World Resort in Bay Lake, Florida. It is located in the Epcot Resort Area, close to Disney's Typhoon Lagoon water park and is classified as a Moderate resort. The resort opened on October 1, 1988 and is owned and operated by Disney Experiences.

== Resort description ==
Disney’s Caribbean Beach Resort is designed with a Caribbean theme. Guests stay in one of the small buildings that encircle Barefoot Bay, a 45-acre (180,000 m^{2}) lake. Buildings are grouped into one of five villages, with shared resources, each named after an island in the Caribbean: Martinique, Barbados, Aruba, Jamaica, and Trinidad. The resort also offers an internal bus service that circulates throughout the entire property, making stops at each village to provide convenient transportation for guests moving between different areas of the resort. Each village has its own swimming pool and some also have their own small playgrounds.

The majority of the resort's facilities are located at Old Port Royale Centertown, a building that contains the hotel lobby, food court, and gift shop. A pool bar and table-service restaurant can also be found nearby in an adjacent building.

The shores of the bay feature beaches, hammocks, lounge chairs, and other activities such as beach volleyball. The resort also features various water sports at the Marina, where resort guests can rent various watercraft, such as paddle boats and speed boats by the half-hour.

=== Guest Rooms ===
Guest rooms are decorated in a Caribbean style with pastel tones, and each island village has slightly different themes. Some guest rooms can sleep up to 5 guests and are equipped with fold-down trundle beds. In 2009, Disney refurbished some of the guest rooms with a Finding Nemo theme. Also in 2009, Disney refurbished many guest rooms in the Trinidad South village with a pirate theme, inspired by the popular Pirates of the Caribbean franchise. In 2023, Disney refurbished many of the guest rooms with an Under the Sea theme, inspired by The Little Mermaid.

=== Dining ===
Caribbean Beach Resort offers a variety of dining options including sit-down restaurants, lounges and bars, and quick service restaurants.

- Sebastian's Bistro – Caribbean Beach's full-service family-style restaurant, serving American cuisine with Caribbean influences.
- Centertown Market – Caribbean Beach's primary quick-service restaurant, located at Old Port Royale
- Banana Cabana – pool bar located at Old Port Royale which serves snacks and drinks poolside.
- Spyglass Grill – serves American food with a Caribbean twist, located by Trinidad's pool.

=== Recreation ===
- Pools – Five heated "quiet pools" are located throughout the island villages. The Fuentes del Morro Pool near Old Port Royale features waterfalls, two water slides, and shooting cannons, and is the resort's feature pool.
- Beaches – Several white-sand beaches are located around the resort for relaxation and for children to play in the sand.
- "Caribbean Cay" – a full-acre playground located in the middle of Barefoot Bay with tropical birds and pleasant seating areas.
- Playgrounds – the resort's primary playground is located on the middle island of "Caribbean Cay".
- Marina – watercraft rentals such as pontoon boats are available on Barefoot Bay. The resort also offers fishing charters, at an additional charge.
- Jogging Trail – a 1.2-mile trail is located around Barefoot Bay.
- Volleyball Courts – volleyball courts are located on Martinique beach.
- Bike Rentals – bicycle and surrey rentals are available for use along the island promenade.

== Renovations ==
In January 2017, plans were filed for extensive resort renovations. The next Disney Vacation Club resort, Disney's Riviera Resort, was built over the original Barbados section and part of the Martinique section. As a result, the Martinique section became the smallest section, the Trinidad North section became the new Barbados section, and the Trinidad South section became known as simply the Trinidad section. Riviera is not considered a part of Caribbean Beach and operates with its own check-in and amenities.

Caribbean Beach serves as the transfer hub of the Disney Skyliner gondola transit system, which connects Epcot and Disney's Hollywood Studios.
