= Disney's Riviera Resort =

Hotel at Walt Disney World

Coordinates: 28.366389°N 81.540278°W

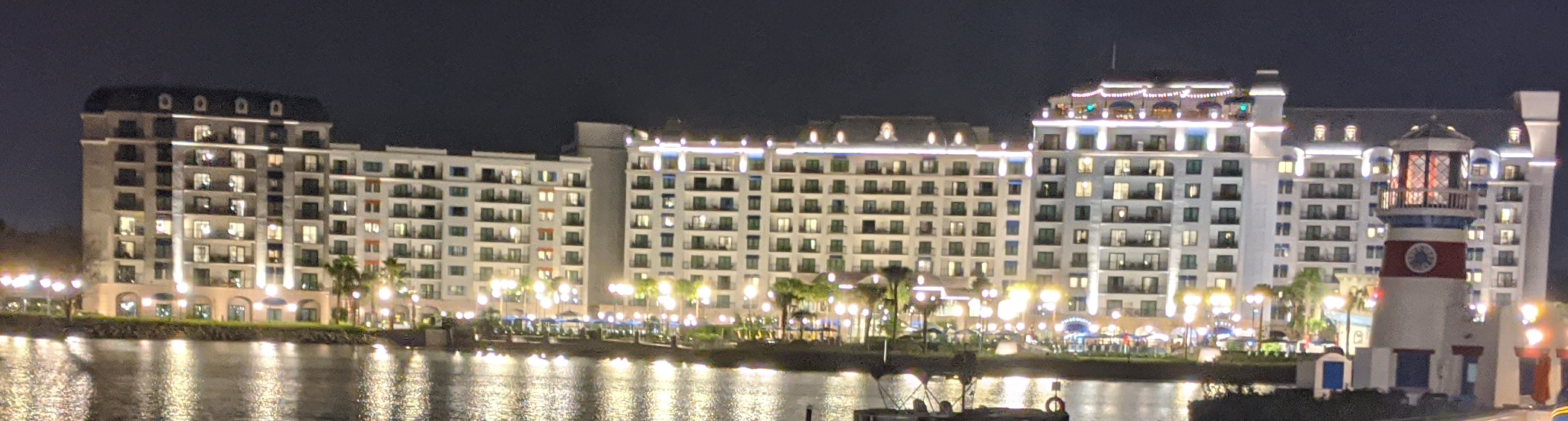
- Disney's Riviera Resort as seen from Disney's Caribbean Beach Resort
- Interactive map of the Disney's Riviera Resort area

General information
- Type: Resort
- Location: Epcot Resort Area
- Opened: December 16, 2019
- Operator: Disney Experiences

Other information
- Number of rooms: 489

Website
- Official website

Disney's Riviera Resort is a Disney Vacation Club resort at the Walt Disney World Resort in Bay Lake, Florida. It was built by Disney Experiences between Epcot and Disney's Hollywood Studios. It is the first newly-constructed resort to be served by the Disney Skyliner gondola system and the 15th Disney Vacation Club property to be built.

The resort is themed after Walt Disney's travels in Europe and his love of the French Riviera and Italian Riviera and is inspired by grand Mediterranean hotels. A collection of his photographs and memorabilia are on display and incorporated into the resort's decor. It opened on December 16, 2019.

== History ==
Plans for the resort were released during the D23 Expo in 2017. It is the first entirely new Disney Vacation Club Resort built since Aulani in O'ahu, Hawaii.

Being a Disney Vacation Club property, the Riviera Resort offers guests multiple room styles ranging from Tower or Deluxe studios to one-, two-, or three-bedroom suites, which it refers to as "villas". Suites include accommodations for up to 12 guests.

== Dining ==
Within the resort, guests have four options for food and beverage:

- Le Petit Café, whose name is inspired by the restaurant in the Disney film The Aristocats, offers pastries, specialty coffee, and lounge service.
- Primo Piatto is a quick-service restaurant that offers breakfast, lunch, dinner, and late-night dining.
- Topolino's Terrace - Flavors of the Riviera is the rooftop, sit-down "signature" experience located at the top of the resort, serving breakfast and dinner. Fireworks shows at EPCOT and Disney's Hollywood Studios are within view during dinner service.
- Bar Riva is an open-air pool bar.

In addition to four restaurants, the "La Boutique" gift shop in the lobby offers a small selection of grocery options like frozen, canned, and pre-made meals, due to the fact the resort largely offers suites with kitchens and caters to Disney Vacation Club members.

== Amenities ==
The Riviera Resort has a full-size pool, a leisure pool, and a shallow interactive splash area for small children.

La Boutique is the Disney merchandise store on-premises.

Resort guests are also given access to Early Theme Park Entry, which allows guests to enter the Disney parks early. As with other Disney resorts, The Riviera uses Magic Bands for room key access.
