= Walt Disney World Swan =

Hotel at Walt Disney World

Coordinates: 28°21′56″N 81°33′32″W

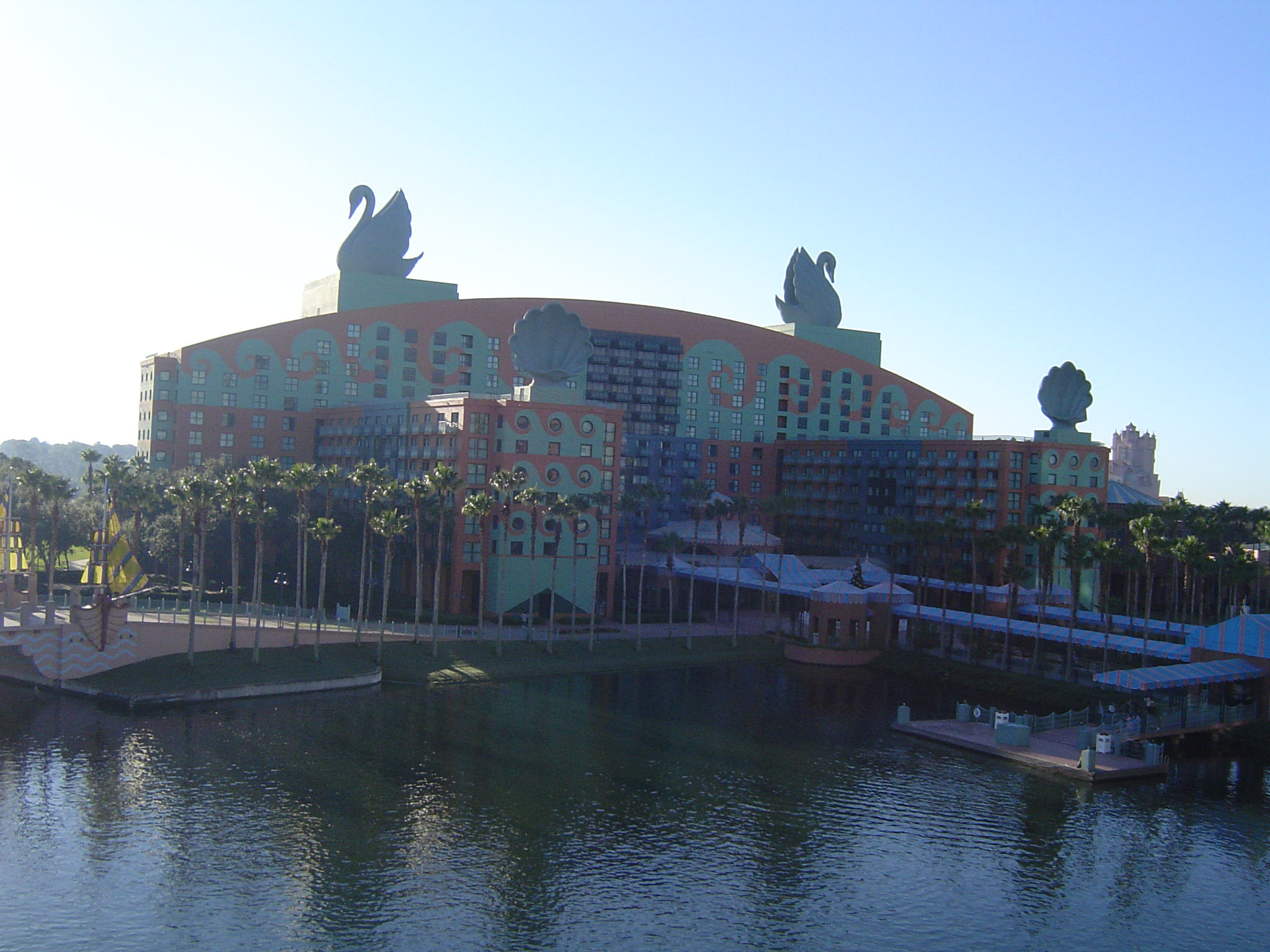

General information
- Type: Resort
- Location: Epcot Resort Area
- Opened: January 13, 1990
- Operator: Westin Hotels & Resorts

Other information
- Number of rooms: 756

Website
- swandolphin.com

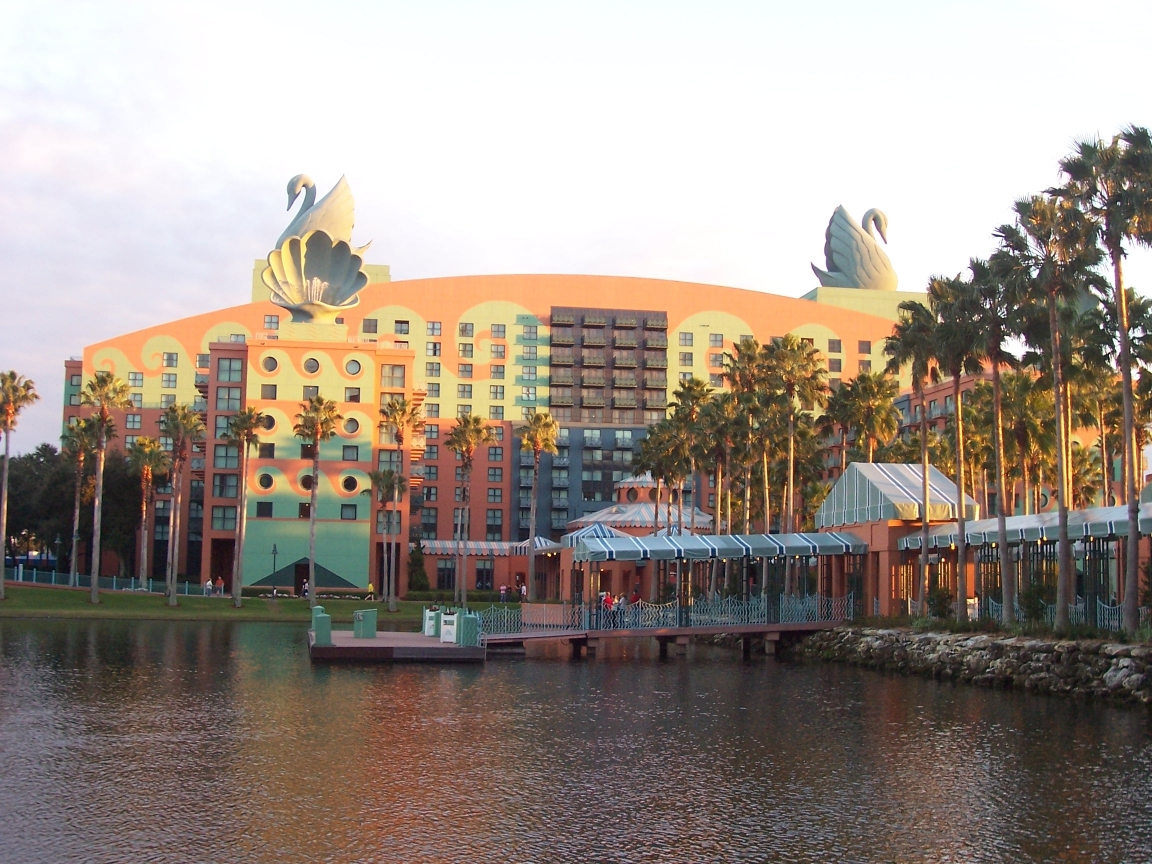
Swan Hotel

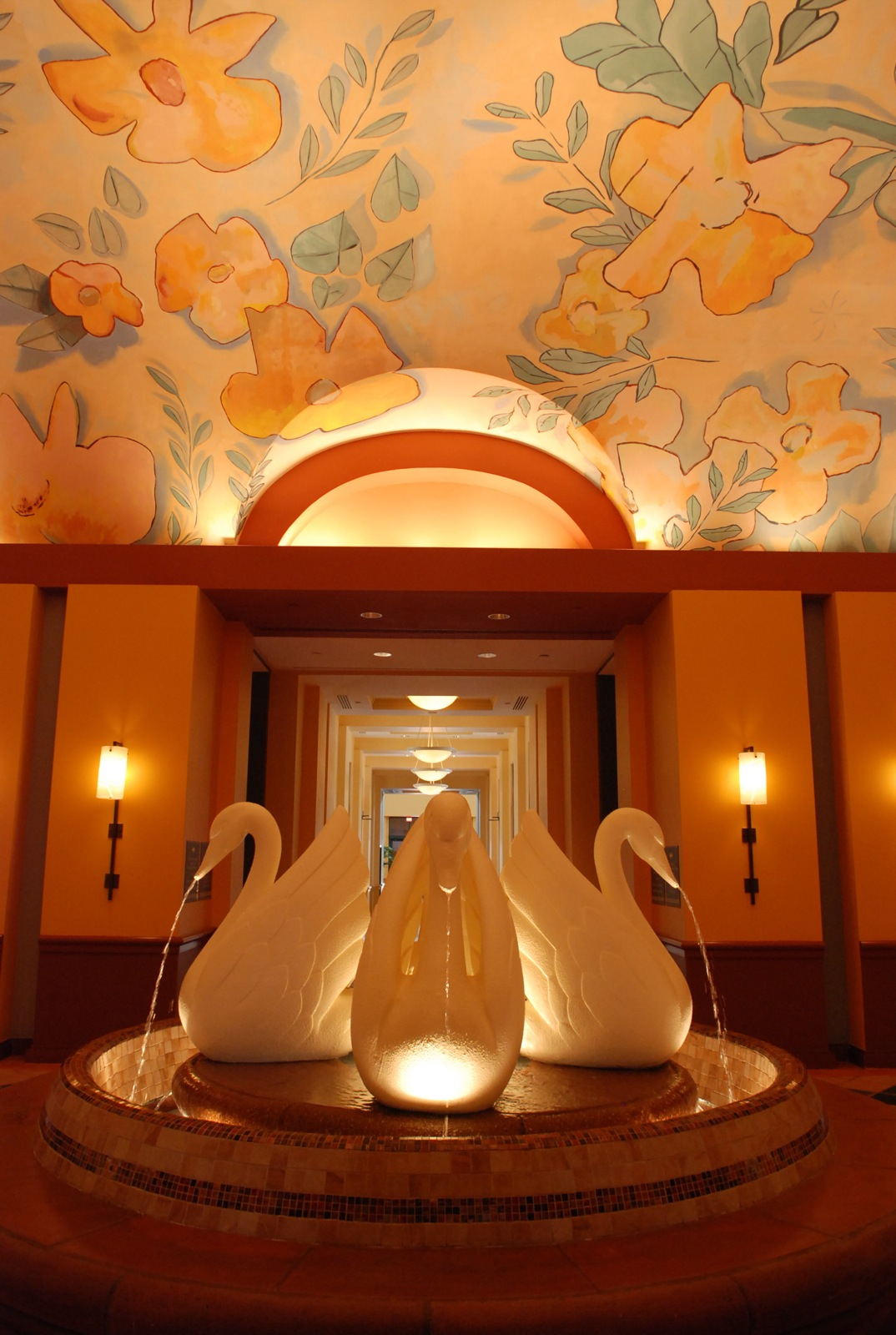
Swan Hotel Lobby

The Walt Disney World Swan is a resort hotel located between Epcot and Disney's Hollywood Studios in the Walt Disney World Resort in Bay Lake, Florida, and across from its sister resort, the Walt Disney World Dolphin, both of which are operated by Marriott International. It is one of the few resorts inside Walt Disney World that is not owned and operated by The Walt Disney Company. The resort opened on January 13, 1990, partially in response to a lack of convention center space inside Walt Disney World.

Both the Swan and Dolphin were designed by Michael Graves and are connected by a covered walkway crossing a lagoon. The hotels were developed as part of a joint venture between Disney, the developer Tishman, insurance company MetLife, Aoki Corporation and Starwood Hotels and Resorts, which was bought by Marriott in 2016. It is operated by Marriott's Westin Hotels & Resorts brand.

The Swan and Dolphin are part of the Walt Disney Collection of resorts, so guests have access to benefits typically available to Disney Resort Hotel guests only, such as early entry.

The Dolphin and Swan share similar elements, but each has a distinctive appearance. The Swan's main structure is a 12-story rectangular main structure with a gently arching top and two 7-story wings, on the Swan side the main structure is crowned with two, 47-foot (14 m) tall Swan statues. The colored facade is adorned with turquoise waves similar to the Dolphin's banana-leaf motif.

== History ==
In the early 1980s, The Walt Disney Company was facing a cash crunch. Company leadership decided that when it decided to add more resorts to Walt Disney World, it would partner with property developers and hotel companies, who would take on the costs and risks of building and managing a hotel. The first of these deals came together in 1985 with developer Tishman, who had been the general contractor of Epcot. Under the deal, Tishman would build a Sheraton and a Crowne Plaza on the outskirts of the Walt Disney World complex, near Walt Disney World Village. In order to protect Tishman’s investment, Disney agreed that no new hotels would be built at Walt Disney World during an exclusivity period.

However, by the mid-1980s, Disney's financial fortunes had improved, and CEO Michael Eisner was growing frustrated that the Walt Disney World Resort was losing business to other hotels in the Orlando area that catered to conventions and large meetings. Tishman, worried that Disney may sign a deal with another developer to build a convention hotel at Walt Disney World during its exclusivity period, filed a lawsuit in 1986 seeking US$1.3 billion in damages and canceled the Sheraton and Holiday Inn. The two-year legal battle ended in 1988 with a settlement, Disney and Tishman would form a joint venture with hotel operator Starwood and investors Aoki and MetLife to build two large hotels with convention facilities.

As part of the deal, no damages would be paid, Disney would receive more say over the design of the complex and a share of revenues, while Tishman would be given a 99-year lease on a much more desirable location within walking distance of Epcot and the yet-to-be-built Disney-MGM Studios and also connected by a waterway with ferry boats. The $375 million project was to include the 1,514-room Dolphin Resort, (Florida’s biggest at the time), the 756-room Swan Resort and 200,000 square feet (19,000 m^{2}) of meeting space.

Disney and Tishman hired architect Michael Graves to design the hotels. Eisner had used Graves for other Disney projects and wanted to continue to build striking, unique buildings. The Swan was the smaller of the two hotels and was scheduled to open first in late 1989 and operated by Westin Hotels & Resorts, which at the time was owned by Aoki.

In 2008, The Walt Disney Swan Resort was awarded a One Palm designation through the Florida Green Lodging Program established by the Florida Department of Environmental Protection. The voluntary program encourages operators to adopt “green” practices that reduce waste and conserve natural resources.

On November 3, 2021, the hotel opened a new wing, the Walt Disney World Swan Reserve, a 349-room luxury boutique hotel adjacent to the original building.

== Amenities ==
The resort, along with the Walt Disney World Dolphin Resort, has two lap pools and one grotto pool with a waterslide and waterfall. Drinks can be ordered by guests near the pools through a nearby cabana bar. Resort guests have access to a spa, arcade, and daycare program, along with multiple Disney gift shops.

Walking paths or Disney boats are available from the resort to both Epcot and Disney's Hollywood Studios. Buses contracted by the hotel bring guests to all other Walt Disney World attractions.

== Dining ==
=== Fine dining ===
- Il Mulino New York Trattoria – Italian
- Kimonos – Sushi

=== Casual dining ===
- Garden Grove – American
- Splash Pool Bar and Grill – Poolside

=== Quick service ===
- Java – Coffee and Food
- Chill – Frozen drinks

=== Lounges ===
- Il Mulino Lounge
- Kimonos Lounge

== Former Dining ==
- Palio – Italian

== Walt Disney World privileges ==
Walt Disney World Swan guests are provided complimentary transportation to all Walt Disney World theme parks and attractions on the Disney Transportation System, via boat (to Epcot and Disney's Hollywood Studios). Length-of-stay park passes are available, as is package delivery from Disney theme park shops to the resort. There is a Walt Disney World guest services desk located in the lobby of each resort. Walt Disney World Swan guests can also use Early Theme Park Access, and begin booking Lightning Lane selections at 7:00am by linking their reservation to the My Disney Experience mobile app. However, room charging (using hotel key as a credit card at Walt Disney World) is not available and hotel restaurants do not participate in the Disney Dining Plan.
