= Green lodges =

Environmentally responsible hotels and resorts

Green lodges are hotels, motels, inns and resorts which meet the standards for environmental responsibility. In the United States, California, Delaware, Florida, Georgia, Maine, Massachusetts, Michigan, New Hampshire, North Carolina, Pennsylvania, Rhode Island, South Carolina, Vermont and Virginia have implemented certification programs to identify facilities which have implemented continuing programs to conserve natural resources, reduce waste and minimizing pollution.

Green Lodge is an online guide that details and ranks the lodges in each state's green programs, and lists those which participate in the Energy Star program or have won sustainability awards.

== Florida ==
Official logo of Green Lodging Florida

The Florida Green Lodging Program was established in 2004 by the Florida Department of Environmental Protection to recognize environmentally conscientious lodging facilities in the state. The program encourages the lodging industry to conserve and protect the state's natural resources through education and certification programs.

Designated hotels must complete a minimum set of best management practices in the areas of communication, water conservation, energy efficiency, waste reduction and clean air to receive a "One Palm" designation. Hotels must progress to "Two Palm" and "Three Palm" designations through continued improvement to retain the right to use the Florida Green Lodging Program designation in their promotion.
