= Toy Story Hotel =

Hotel in Shanghai Disney Resort

Coordinates: 31.1416924°N 121.6485655°E

- 玩具總動員酒店
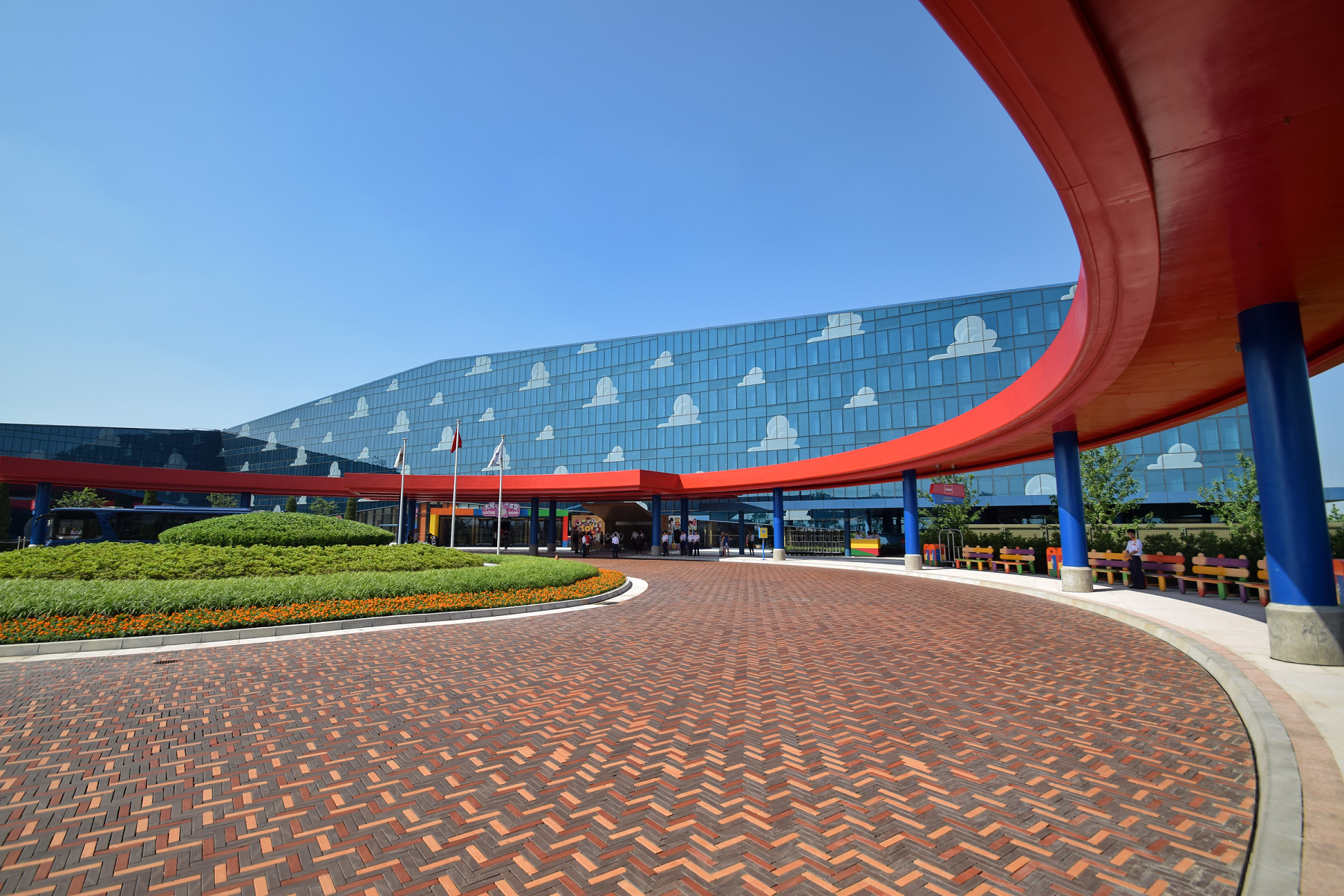
- Interactive map of the Toy Story Hotel area

General information
- Status: Completed
- Type: Resort
- Location: Shanghai Disney Resort, Shanghai, China
- Opened: 16 June 2016; 10 years ago

Other information
- Number of rooms: 800

Website
- Official website

The Toy Story Hotel is one of two hotels located within Shanghai Disney Resort. The hotel is themed after the Disney Pixar franchise of Toy Story animated films. The hotel has two sections, the Sheriff Woody wing and the Buzz Lightyear wing. The hotel, when viewed from above, has the appearance of an infinity symbol. Toy Story Hotel was opened in 2016 together with the rest of the resort.

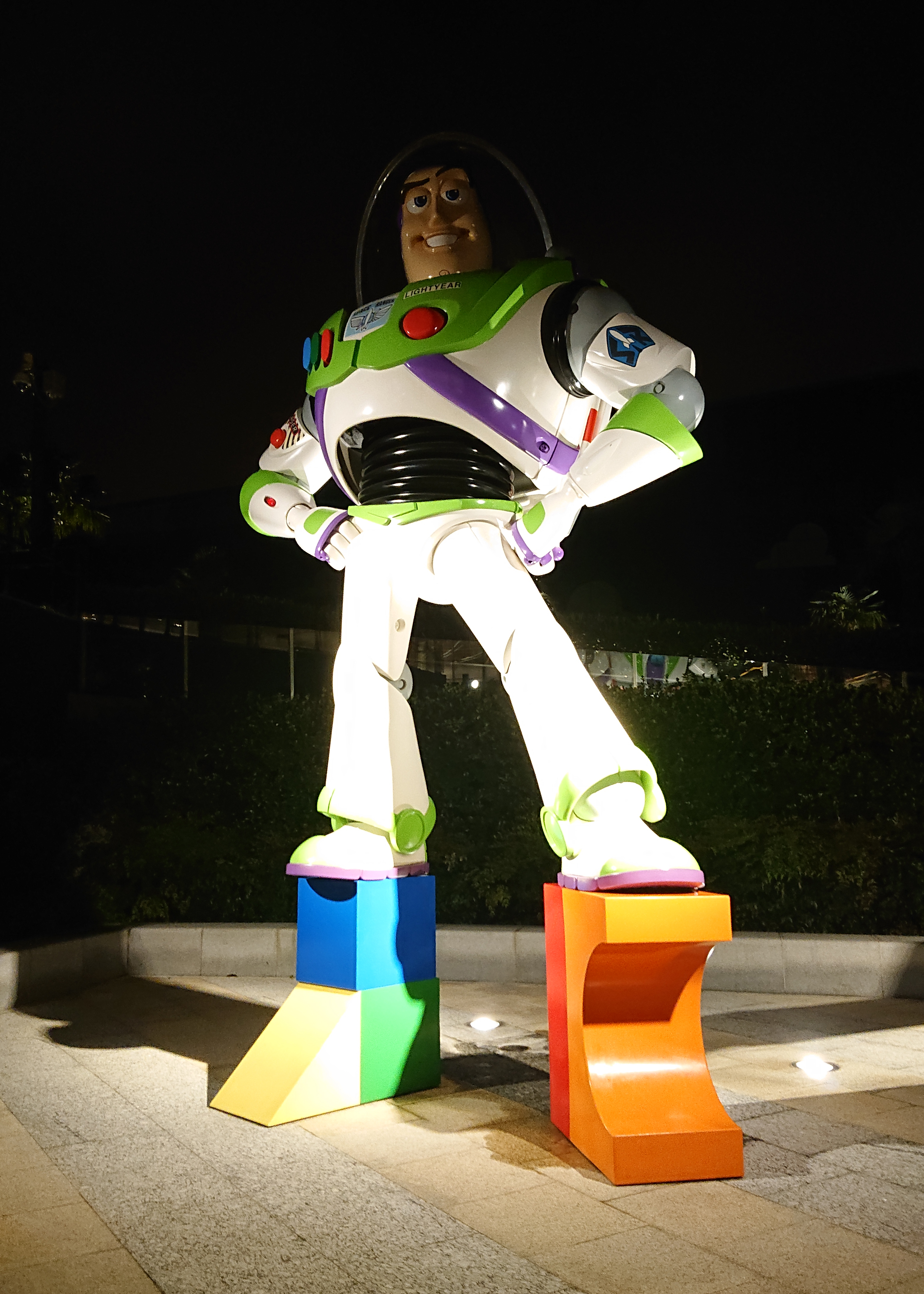
Buzz Lightyear statue outside of the Toy Story Hotel

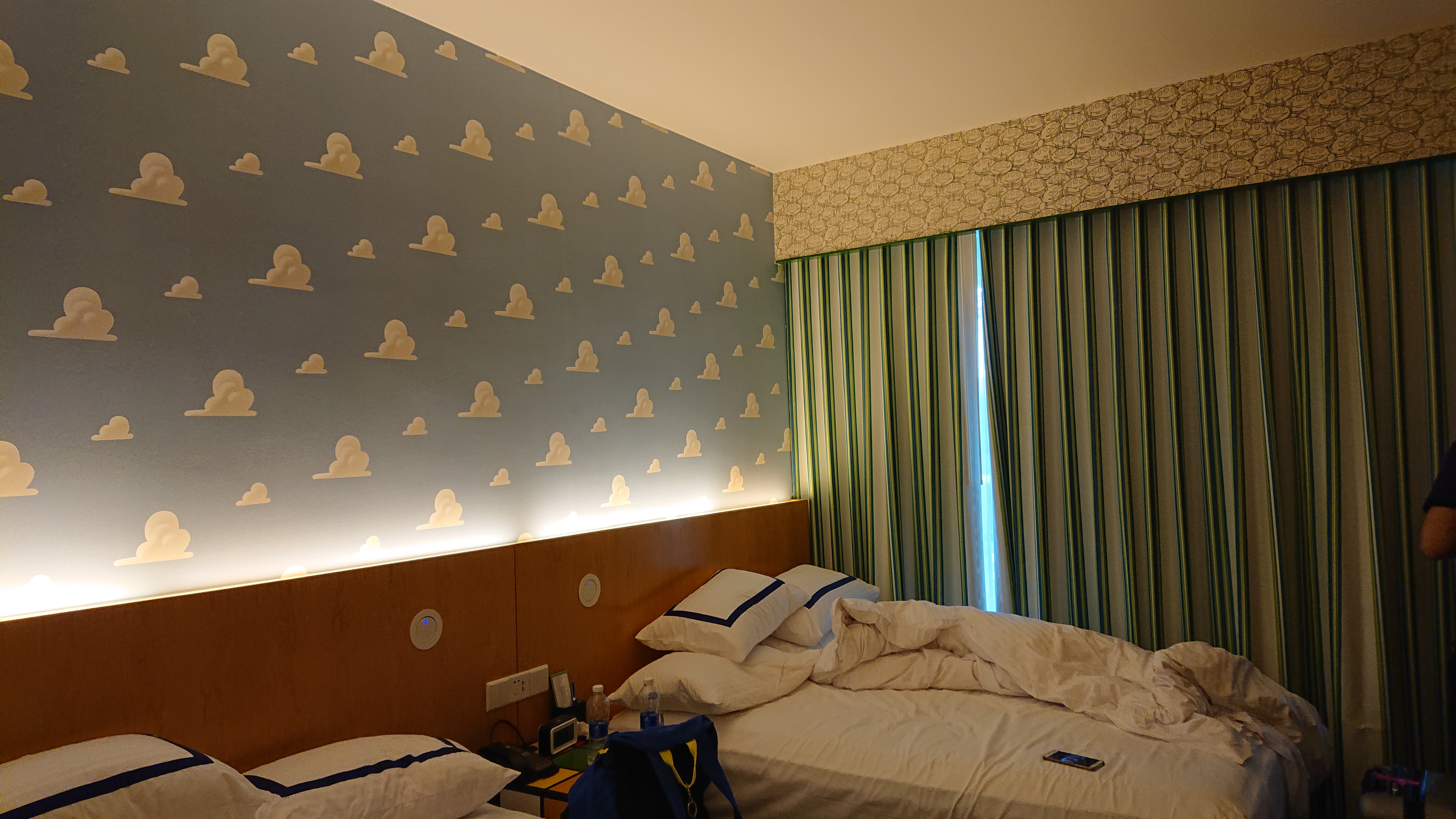
Toy Story Hotel room interior

== Theming ==
The hotel is the first hotel to be themed entirely to Toy Story. It is similar to the value resorts at Walt Disney World Resort (Disney's All Star Movies, Music, Sports, Pop Century, and Art of Animation Resorts), in that it includes oversized sculptures in its courtyard. It is most similar to the Art of Animation Resort, which is also themed after Disney•Pixar films.
