= All-star (disambiguation) =

An all-star is an individual with a high level of performance in their field.

All-star or All Star may also refer to:

== Awards ==
- GAA GPA All Stars Awards, annual awards given to practitioners of Gaelic games
  - Camogie All Stars Awards
  - Ladies' Gaelic football All Stars Awards
  - List of All Stars Awards winners (football)
  - List of All Stars Awards winners (hurling)
    - All Stars Footballer of the Year
    - All Stars Hurler of the Year
      - All Stars Young Footballer of the Year
      - All Stars Young Hurler of the Year

== Books ==
- All Star Comics, a 1940s comic book series
- All Star DC Comics, an imprint of comic book titles from 2005 to 2008
- All-Star (character), a character from DC Comics, though otherwise unrelated to the aforementioned series

== Film and television ==
- All Stars (1997 film), a Dutch sports comedy film
- All Stars (2013 film), a British dance film
- All Stars (2014 film), an American sports comedy film
- All Stars (TV series), an Italian television series
- Pretty Cure All Stars, an anime film series
- Project Runway All Stars, a spin-off series of Project Runway
- Road Rules: All Stars, 1st season of MTV competition reality series, latter rebranded to "The Challenge"
- RuPaul's Drag Race: All Stars, a spin-off series of RuPaul's Drag Race
- Survivor: All-Stars, the 8th season of Survivor
- Total Drama All-Stars, the 5th season of Total Drama
- America's Next Top Model: All-Stars, the 17th season of America's Next Top Model
- Exatlón Estados Unidos: All-Stars, the 7th, 8th, and 9th seasons of Exatlon broadcast on Telemundo in the United States
- La casa de los famosos: All-Stars, the 5th season of La casa de los famosos broadcast on Telemundo in the United States
- Mira quien baila All Stars, the seventh season of Mira quien baila broadcast on Univisión
- Lego Star Wars: All-Stars
- All Stars - De serie, a Dutch television series featuring Jack Wouterse

== Music ==
- All Star Records, a reggaeton record label from Puerto Rico

=== Artists ===
- All-Stars (band), a British blues group
- Allstars (band), a UK pop band
- Doug Anthony All Stars, an Australian musical comedy group
- Easy Star All-Stars, a reggae and dub collective
- Junior Walker & the All Stars, a 1960s soul group
- La Secta AllStar
- Ringo Starr & His All-Starr Band
- Louis Armstrong and His All Stars, a jazz sextet from the 1940s
- P-Funk All-Stars, a funk and soul collective featuring members of Parliament-Funkadelic

=== Albums ===
- All Stars (Jurica Pađen album)
- AllStar (album), a 2001 album La Secta AllStar
- Allstars (album), a 2002 album by Allstars

=== Songs ===
- "All Star" (song), a song by Smash Mouth
- "All Stars" (song), a song by Martin Solveig
- "All Star", a song by Ty Dolla Sign
- "All Star", a song by Lil Tecca

== Sport ==
- All-Star Mile, an Australian thoroughbred horse race
- All Star Wrestling, a British professional wrestling promotion run by Brian Dixon
- AWA All-Star Wrestling, American Wrestling Association television program featuring matches and interviews
- Ballymena United Allstars F.C., a British women's association football team
- All-Stars, an Australia Football League team

== Video games ==
- Defense of the Ancients: Allstars, a custom map for Warcraft III: The Frozen Throne
- Blizzard All-stars, a working title for Heroes of the Storm
- Sega All-Stars (series), a series of crossover video games
- Super Mario All-Stars, a video game with four Mario titles
- Super Mario 3D All-Stars, a Nintendo Switch game with three 3D Mario platform titles
- All-Star, a playable game mode in the Super Smash Bros. franchise
- Nickelodeon All-Star Brawl, a 2021 video game developed by Ludosity and Fair Play Labs

== Other uses ==
- Chuck Taylor All-Stars, a line of sport shoes by Converse
- All Stars, a miniature chocolate assortment by Nestlé
- Disney's All-Star Sports Resort, Disney's All-Star Music Resort, and Disney's All-Star Movies Resort, resort hotels at Walt Disney World Resort in Lake Buena Vista, FL

== See also ==
- All Star Cashville Prince, American rapper
- The Amazing Race: All-Stars (disambiguation)
- Bad Girls All-Star Battle, spin-off series of Bad Girls Club
