= Epcot Center Ultralight Flightpark =

Former private-use ultralight airport

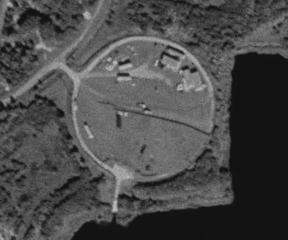
- Epcot Center Ultralight Flightpark; November 1999
- IATA: none; ICAO: none; FAA LID: 44FD

Summary
- Airport type: Private
- Owner: The Walt Disney Company
- Location: Bay Lake, Florida
- Elevation AMSL: 102 ft (31 m)
- Coordinates: 28°21′11″N 081°32′49″W

Map
- Interactive map of Epcot Center Ultralight Flightpark

Runways
Direction	Length		Surface
Direction	ft	m	Surface
ALL/WAY	424	129	Turf
- Source: Federal Aviation Administration

Epcot Center Ultralight Flightpark (FAA LID: 44FD) was a private-use ultralight airport located in Bay Lake, Florida.

== History ==
It was privately owned by the Walt Disney World Company, and was used to launch aircraft used in the "Skyleidoscope" (1985–1987) and "Surprise in the Skies" (1991–1992) shows at the Epcot theme park.

Although still listed active in FAA records as recently as September 2010, the facility closed for theme park use in 1992, when "Surprise in the Skies" ended. The land sat unused for nearly 10 years, when it was cleared for the second phase of Disney's Pop Century Resort, named the Legendary Years. Construction on the hotel was stopped after the September 11 attacks caused tourism to drop off, but development later resumed and the land of the former airfield is now the site of Disney's Art of Animation Resort, which opened in May 2012.

=== Incidents ===
On August 1, 1987, a 27-year-old male cast member from Winter Garden was killed when the ultralight aircraft he was flying crashed during a show rehearsal. The pilot was practicing for Epcot's "Skyleidoscope" show at an altitude of 500–1000 feet when the ultralight suffered catastrophic structural failure, nosediving into the ground about 150 yards from the flightpark and 1.5 miles from Epcot.

== Facilities and aircraft ==
Epcot Center Ultralight Flightpark had one circular runway designated "ALL/WAY" with a 424 × 424 ft (129 × 129 m) turf surface. There were 20 aircraft based at this airport: 50% single-engine and 50% ultralight.

== See also ==
- Walt Disney World Airport
