= Walt Disney World Airport =

- IATA: ~~DWS~~; ICAO: none

Summary
- Airport type: Private
- Owner: Walt Disney Company
- Location: Bay Lake, Florida
- Coordinates: 28.4°N 81.5715°W

Map
- Interactive map of Walt Disney World Airport

Runways
Direction	Length		Surface
Direction	ft	m	Surface
16/34	2,000 x 100	609.6 x 30.5	Asphalt

Walt Disney World Airport, also known as Lake Buena Vista Airport and Lake Buena Vista STOLport (IATA: ~~DWS~~), is a former small airfield owned by The Walt Disney Company, located within Walt Disney World, just across World Drive from the Transportation and Ticket Center, in Bay Lake in Orange County, Florida, United States. When it was active, it accommodated smaller commuter airliners such as the de Havilland Canada DHC-6 Twin Otter turboprop, which had STOL ("Short Take Off and Landing") capabilities and could operate from airfields with short runways (also known as STOLports). It is no longer registered as an active airport by the FAA, ICAO, and IATA, and as of December 2017 serves Walt Disney World as a storage lot.

== History ==
Lake Buena Vista Airport was built in 1971 to serve as an airfield for Walt Disney World guests and employees, with scheduled passenger airline service to Orlando Jetport at McCoy (now Orlando International Airport) and Tampa International Airport provided by Shawnee Airlines, using STOL-capable De Havilland Canada DHC-6 Twin Otter aircraft. Executive Airlines also offered scheduled passenger service into the airport using DHC-6 aircraft.

The airport was never large, with only enough ramp space at the passenger terminal to accommodate four aircraft at a time, and no hangar space was ever built. This STOL airfield was intended as a proof-of-concept but was ultimately rejected in favor of a vision for a larger, full-service airport within Walt Disney World itself, which itself was later rejected.

There has been no scheduled or unscheduled commercial service to this airport since the early 1980s. The next nearest airport to the resort, Kissimmee Gateway Airport, briefly offered passenger service through DayJet which suspended operations in 2008. As of 2024, most Walt Disney World guests arrive through Orlando International Airport and to a lesser extent, Orlando Sanford International Airport or Melbourne Orlando International Airport.

The runway and apron have been converted to storage and parking. They are visible to motorists traveling along World Drive toward the Transportation and Ticket Center and passengers on the monorail.

== "The Singing Airport" ==
The runway featured a set of grooves, like rumble strips on the side of a highway, that played "When You Wish Upon a Star" when driven over at roughly 45 miles per hour (72 km/h) to surprise the airplane passengers. The musical grooves were removed in 2008.

It is considered a precursor to future musical roads, the first of which was built in Denmark in 1995. The musical road in the village of Takayama, Gunma, Japan, plays the same song the "Singing Runway" once did.

== See also ==
- Disney Transport
- Epcot Center Ultralight Flightpark
