= Disney's All-Star Music Resort =

Hotel at Walt Disney World

Coordinates: 28.339842°N 81.572950°W

- Interactive map of the Disney's All-Star Music Resort area

General information
- Type: Resort
- Location: Animal Kingdom Resort Area
- Opened: November 22, 1994
- Operator: Disney Experiences

Other information
- Number of rooms: 1,412
- Number of suites: 192

Website
- Official website

Disney's All-Star Music Resort is a hotel within the Walt Disney World Resort in Osceola County, Florida. It belongs to the Value Resort category, alongside Disney's All-Star Sports Resort, Disney's All-Star Movies Resort, Disney's Pop Century Resort, and Disney's Art of Animation Resort. Positioned in the southern part of the Walt Disney World property, near Disney's Animal Kingdom, the resort spans 1,412 rooms and includes 192 family suites, a feature introduced first among Disney's Value Resorts. The resort's design centers on a music theme, with oversized decorations representing genres such as Broadway show tunes, calypso, country, jazz, and rock n’ roll. These include large-scale replicas of instruments like guitars, trumpets, and drums. The resort participates in the Florida Green Lodging Program, meeting state environmental standards.

Construction for the All-Star Resort complex began in November 1992, with Arquitectonica of Miami serving as the architect. Disney's All-Star Music Resort opened on November 22, 1994, following Disney's All-Star Sports Resort as the second in the All-Star series. The Calypso section opened first, while the Broadway section was completed last on February 17, 1995.

== Areas ==
The resort is divided into five themed sections, each with two buildings:

- Calypso (Buildings 1 & 10), reflecting Caribbean and Latin music styles.
- Jazz Inn (Buildings 2 & 9), themed around jazz music.
- Rock Inn (Buildings 3 & 4), focused on rock n’ roll.
- Country Fair (Buildings 5 & 6), inspired by country music.
- Broadway Hotel (Buildings 7 & 8), modeled after Broadway theater.

== Dining and shopping ==
The resort offers several dining and shopping options:

- Intermission Food Court: A food court with multiple stations offering items like pizza, pasta, burgers, and salads.
- Singing Spirits Pool Bar: A bar near the main pool serving drinks and light snacks.
- Maestro Mickey's: A shop selling Disney merchandise, snacks, and resort-specific items.
- Note’able Arcade: An arcade with video games and activities for guests.

== Recreation ==
The resort includes two pools: the Calypso Pool, shaped like a guitar with a Three Caballeros fountain, and the Piano Pool, designed to resemble a grand piano. Additional activities include a playground, jogging trail, and nightly outdoor movie screenings under the stars.

== Transportation ==
Guests can access Walt Disney World theme parks, water parks, and Disney Springs via bus service. Buses run regularly to all major destinations within the resort complex.
