= The Amazing Race: All-Stars =

The Amazing Race: All-Stars may refer on these titles:

- The Amazing Race 11, the first All-Star version of the eleventh season of The Amazing Race
- The Amazing Race 24, the second All-Star version of the twenty-fourth season of The Amazing Race
