= Disney's All-Star Movies Resort =

Hotel at Walt Disney World

Coordinates: 28.335950°N 81.572210°W

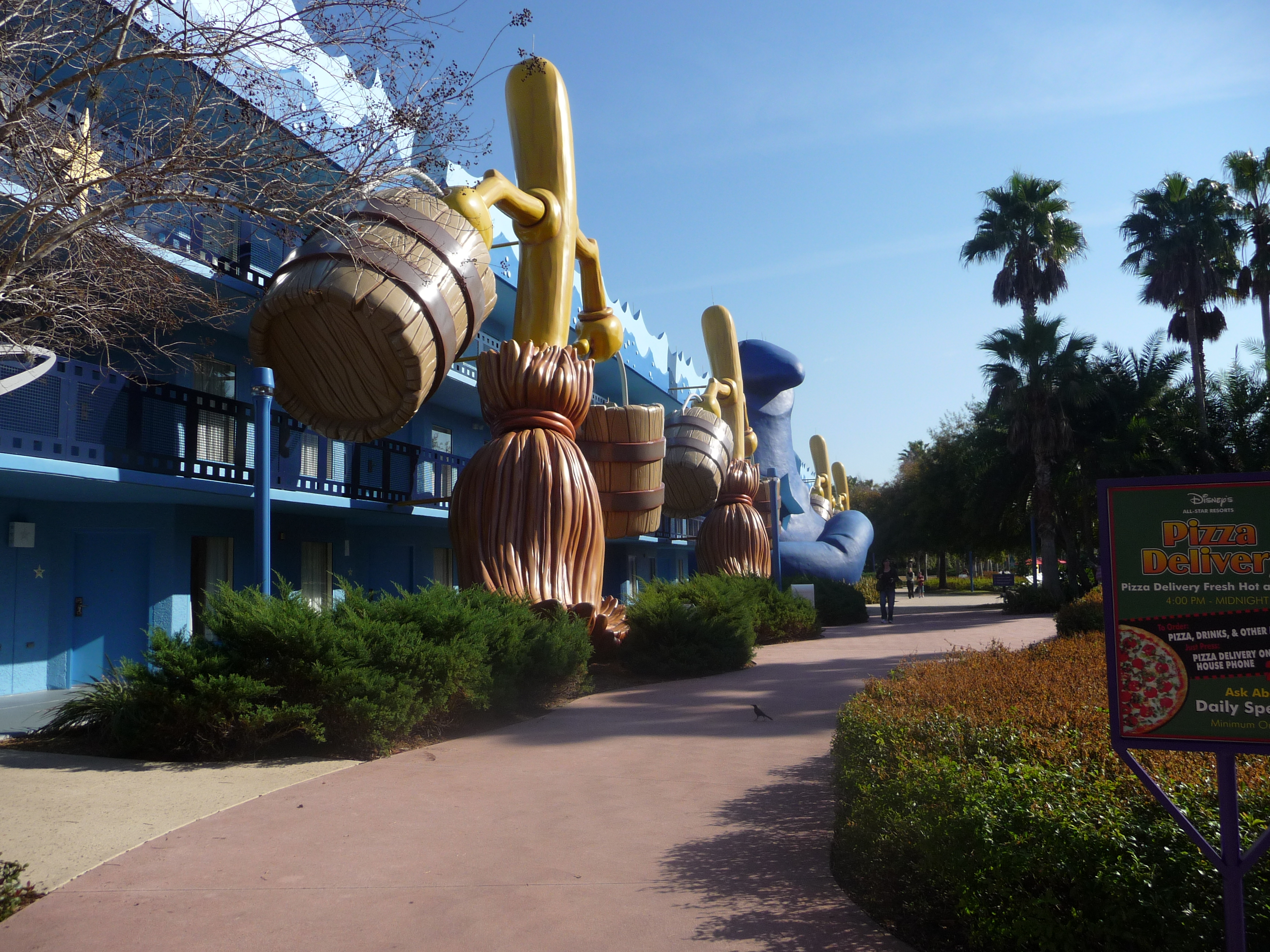
- Fantasia-themed room building
- Interactive map of the Disney's All-Star Movies Resort area

General information
- Type: Resort
- Location: Animal Kingdom Resort Area
- Opened: January 15, 1999

Other information
- Number of rooms: 1,920

Website
- Official website

Disney's All-Star Movies Resort is a hotel within the Walt Disney World Resort in Osceola County, Florida. It is one of five resorts in the Value category, alongside Disney's All-Star Sports Resort, Disney's All-Star Music Resort, Disney's Pop Century Resort, and Disney's Art of Animation Resort. Located in the southern portion of the Walt Disney World property near Disney's Animal Kingdom, the resort features a Disney movie theme with 1,920 rooms. The property is decorated with oversized icons from Disney films, including the Fantasia Pool, a Mighty Ducks-themed Duck Pond Pool, Herbie from The Love Bug, puppies from One Hundred and One Dalmatians, and characters from Pixar’s Toy Story. Like other Value resorts, it includes a large food court and a poolside bar.

Most rooms have two queen beds, with a limited number featuring king-size beds. Accessible rooms for guests with disabilities are available. Each room includes irons, ironing boards, mini-refrigerators, hair dryers, and in-room safes.

Construction for the All-Star Resort complex began in November 1992, with Arquitectonica of Miami as the architect. Disney's All-Star Movies Resort, the third in the All-Star series, opened on January 15, 1999, following Disney's All-Star Sports Resort and Disney's All-Star Music Resort. The 101 Dalmatians and Mighty Ducks sections opened first on January 15, 1999, followed by Fantasia and The Love Bug in March 1999, and Toy Story in April 1999.

== Areas ==
The resort is divided into five themed sections, each with two buildings:

- 101 Dalmatians (Buildings 1 & 4), themed around the animated film.
- Mighty Ducks (Buildings 2 & 3), inspired by the hockey-themed film series.
- Fantasia (Buildings 5 & 8), based on the animated musical film.
- The Love Bug (Buildings 6 & 7), featuring Herbie the Volkswagen Beetle.
- Toy Story (Buildings 9 & 10), centered on Pixar's animated characters.

== Dining and Shopping ==
The resort offers several dining and shopping options:

- World Premiere Food Court: A food court with multiple stations serving items like pizza, pasta, burgers, and salads.
- Silver Screen Spirits Bar: A poolside bar offering drinks and light snacks.
- Donald's Double Feature: A shop selling Disney merchandise, snacks, and resort-specific items.
- Reel Fun Arcade: An arcade with video games and activities for guests.

== Recreation ==
The resort features two pools: the Fantasia Pool, inspired by the film's imagery, and the Duck Pond Pool, themed after The Mighty Ducks. Additional amenities include a playground, jogging trail, and nightly outdoor movie screenings under the stars.

== Disney Transportation ==
Guests can access Walt Disney World theme parks, water parks, and Disney Springs via bus service. Buses run regularly to all major destinations within the resort complex.
