= Disney's All-Star Sports Resort =

Hotel at Walt Disney World

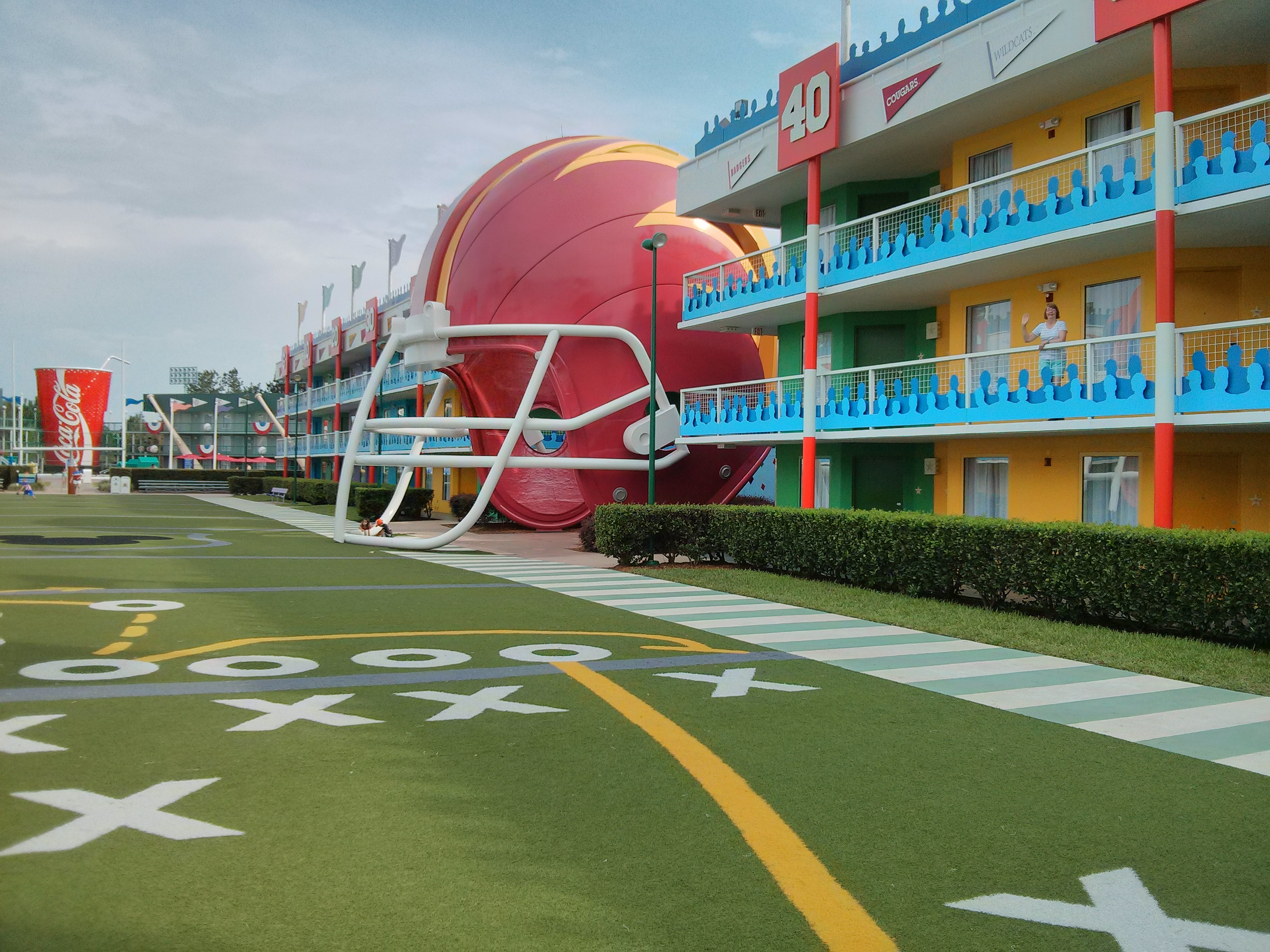
- A Touchdown! building at Disney's All-Star Sports Resort
- Interactive map of the Disney's All-Star Sports Resort area

General information
- Type: Resort
- Location: Animal Kingdom Resort Area
- Opened: April 29, 1994
- Operator: Disney Experiences

Other information
- Number of rooms: 1,920

Website
- Official website

Disney's All-Star Sports Resort is a sports-themed resort that is part of the Walt Disney World Resort in Osceola County, Florida. It is one of five Resorts in the Value Resort category, along with Disney's All-Star Music Resort, Disney's All-Star Movies Resort, Disney's Pop Century Resort, and Disney's Art of Animation Resort. All three All-Star Resorts are located on the southern portion of the Walt Disney World property (the only portion that is located in Osceola County; the rest of Walt Disney World is located in Orange County). As is characteristic of all Disney Value resorts, the property is decorated with giant novelty items, such as SurfBoard Bay, the baseball-themed Grand Slam Pool and a football field, and a giant football helmet. As with the other All-Star Resorts, the Miami company Arquitectonica designed the resort.

The resort has an additional building, Celebrity Hall, located in the very back of the parking lot of All-Star Sports, near All Star Music. It is used by large groups staying at the resort as a centrally located meeting spot.

== Areas ==
- Surfs Up! (Bldgs. 1 & 6), themed with giant surfboards and shark fins
- Hoops Hotel (Bldgs. 2 & 3), a basketball section
- Center Court (Bldgs. 4 & 5), a tennis-themed area
- Touchdown! (Bldgs. 7 & 10), themed to American football
- Homerun Hotel (Bldgs. 8 & 9), featuring a baseball theme

== Dining and shopping ==
- End Zone Food Court
- Grandstand Spirits Pool Bar
- Sport Goofy Gifts and Sundries
- Game Point Arcade

== Disney transportation ==
Disney's All-Star Resorts are connected via Disney Transport buses to the theme parks and Disney Springs. Seasonal bus transportation is also provided directly to Disney's Blizzard Beach when the water park is in operation.
