= Disney's Pop Century Resort =

Hotel at Walt Disney World

Coordinates: 28.350328°N 81.543027°W

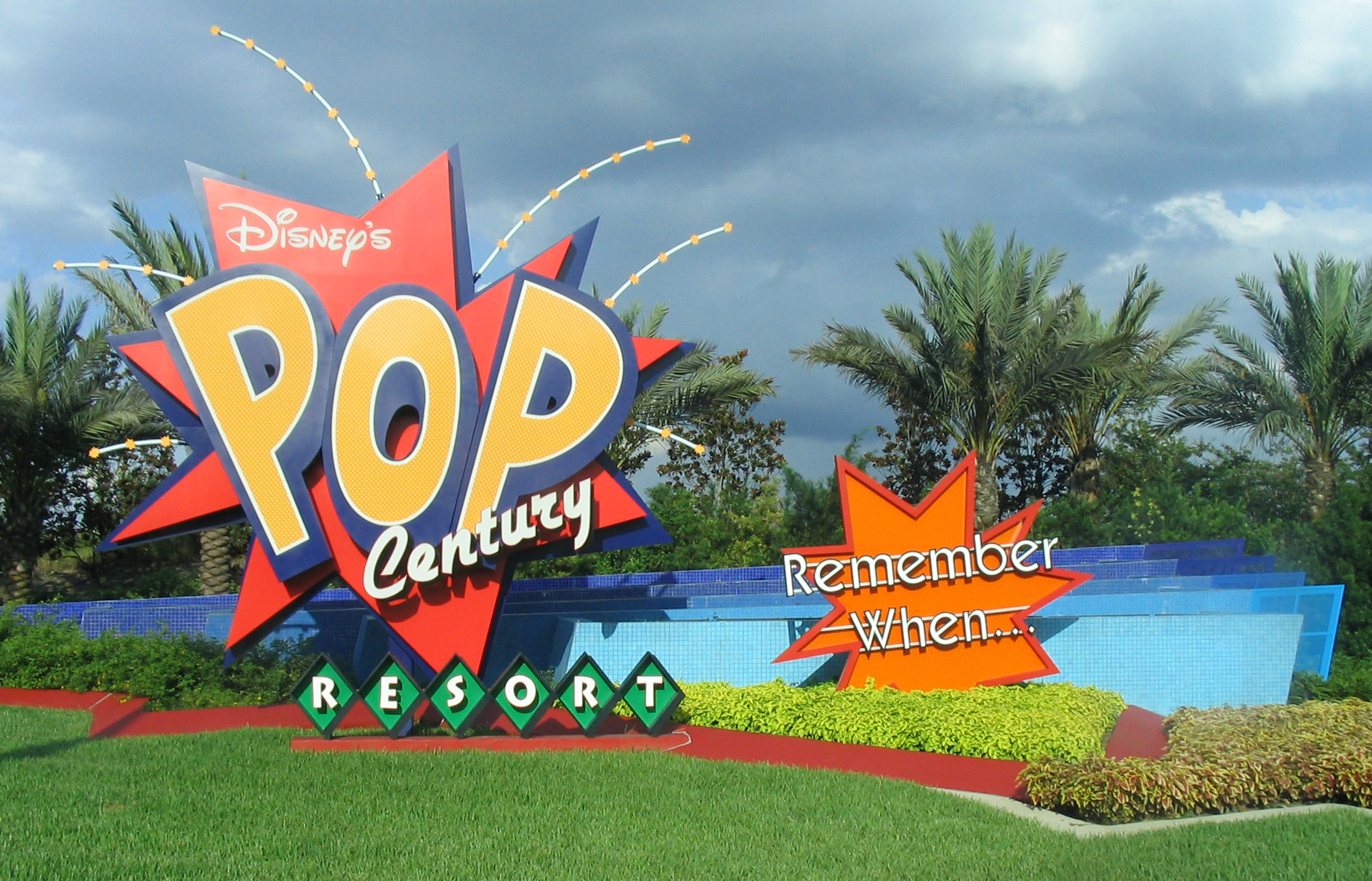
- Main entrance to Disney's Pop Century Resort
- Interactive map of the Disney's Pop Century Resort area

General information
- Type: Resort
- Location: ESPN Wide World of Sports Resort Area
- Opened: December 14, 2003
- Operator: Disney Experiences

Other information
- Number of rooms: 2,880

Website
- Official website

Disney's Pop Century Resort is a resort located at the Walt Disney World Resort in Bay Lake, Florida, opened on December 14, 2003. It is the fourth value-priced resort in the complex, following Disney's All-Star Movies, All-Star Music, and All-Star Sports Resorts in the 1990s. The resort is themed around 20th century American pop culture.

Original plans anticipated the creation of both the "Legendary Years" and the "Classic Years" to divide the property by the first and second halves of the century, respectively. However, the former section was not finished after reduced tourism in the aftermath of the September 11 attacks and redeveloped as a fifth value-priced resort, Disney's Art of Animation Resort, in 2012.

== Background ==
After achieving international success with existing accommodations, Walt Disney Parks and Resorts began construction of the first value-priced resorts at the Walt Disney World Resort in Lake Buena Vista, Florida. The three-resort complex opened during the 1990s, consisting of Disney's All-Star Movies, All-Star Music, and All-Star Sports Resorts. The properties proved themselves as successful investments, leading to the development of a fourth value-priced resort in 1999. The resort was originally planned to open in December 2001, though the opening was eventually delayed to March 2002. It was delayed once more before accepting reservations on April 22, 2003, and opening on December 14, 2003.

The original plans for the resort included a second phase of units themed to the Legendary Years, which would have included 1900 – 1940s themed buildings. These rooms would have resided across a lake from the Classic Years section, and would be connected by the 'Generation Gap' bridge to that section. Construction for both phases were started at the same time, but after the September 11 attacks, Disney scaled back the hotel due to the reduction in tourism.

The Classic Years section opened in 2003, while the Legendary Years lobby building (to be called "Legendary Hall") plus several of its buildings were left uncompleted. Initially, the completed resort was to have an additional 2,880 rooms on the Legendary side, configured identically to the Classic side. The parking lot for the expansion was completed during the earlier phase of construction, and occasionally was used as overflow parking for the ESPN Wide World of Sports Complex.

On May 12, 2010, Disney Parks announced plans to complete the remaining section of the resort as a separate, value-priced resort known as Disney's Art of Animation Resort. It is based on four of Disney and Pixar's most popular films: The Little Mermaid, The Lion King, Finding Nemo, and Cars. However, to distinguish it from Pop Century, the hotel has 1,120 suites, designed for up to six people. The remaining 864 rooms are standard value-resort size. The addition of suites was based on positive guest responses after a number of hotel rooms at Disney's All-Star Music Resort were combined to form larger accommodations. Construction resumed in the summer of 2010, and the resort opened in May 2012.

In 2017, Disney's Pop Century Resort began a massive refurbishment which included the addition of queen-sized beds (one of which is a Murphy-style bed), hard surface floors, and a small refrigerator. That process was complete in the summer of 2018.

== Property ==
Each themed area features motel-style buildings adorned with larger-than-life phrases and iconography of the decade being represented. The resort has 2,880 rooms in ten separate buildings, three pool areas, and one central building, named "Classic Hall", that houses the front desk, gift shop, arcade, and food court. The buildings are four-story versions of the three-story All Star Resort buildings.

When the "Legendary Years" buildings were first being built, a bridge named the Generation Gap Bridge was constructed to connect both parts of Pop Century and made them accessible to each other. The bridge today connects Pop Century to the Finding Nemo section of the Art of Animation Resort. This bridge contains a terminal for the Disney Skyliner aerial gondola system.

== Theming ==
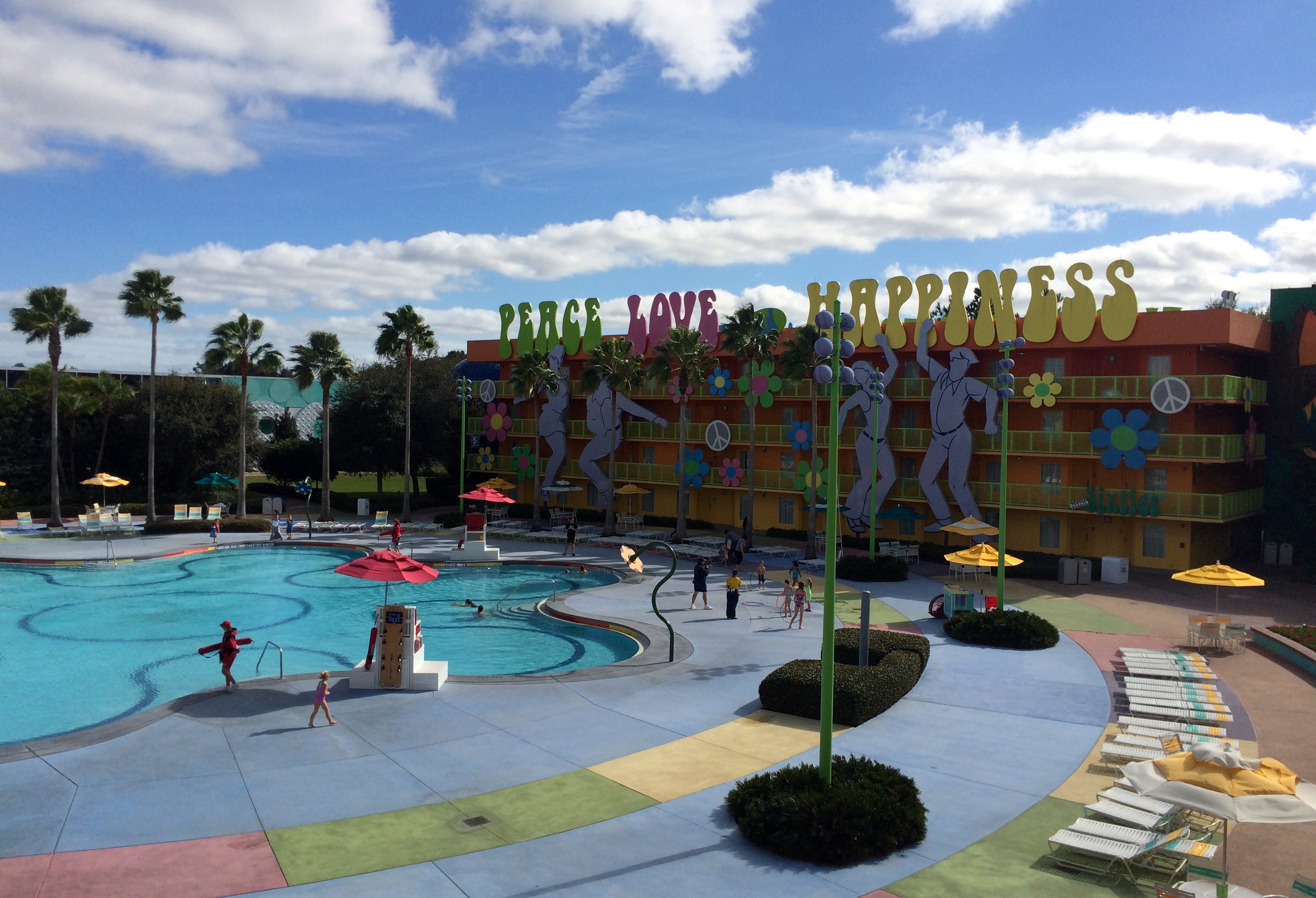
An example of the 1960s theming, including the "Hippie Dippy Pool".

In the Classic Years section of the resort, each area is themed with a specific decade and giant items related to that decade. This was originally one of two planned construction phases for the resort, but has become the only completed area of the resort due to a scaling-back of the project.

1950s

- Bowling pin staircases
- Lady and the Tramp statue
- 45rpm records
- Transistor radio
- Jukebox
- Bowling Pin Pool

1960s

- Yo-yo staircases
- Hippie flowers (including the flower-shaped "Hippie Dippy Pool")
- Peace symbol
- Baloo statue with Mowgli
- Play-Doh
- Goofy with surfboard statue in front of a red 1964 Chevrolet Corvette Sting Ray Coupe (previously part of a water playground)

1970s

- 8-track tape staircases
- Disco Dancing
- Foosball setup
- Four-story tall Big Wheel
- Mickey Mouse phone
- Mood ring
- Two Twister play areas

1980s

- Rubik's Cube staircases
- Roger Rabbit statue
- A giant Walkman
- Mr. Potato Head
- Michael Jackson
- Pac-Man
- Computer Pool (shared with '90s)

1990s

- Cell phone staircases
- A giant laptop
- Giant floppy disks and a computer keyboard
- Rollerblades
- Hip-hop dance
- Computer Pool (shared with '80s)

Disney Transport buses provide scheduled service between the resort hotel and the theme parks, water parks, and Disney Springs. The Disney Skyliner can also be used to travel between Pop Century Resort and both EPCOT and Disney's Hollywood Studios. The resort has laundry facilities and babysitting options available. As of April 2012, refrigerators and internet access are now complimentary.

The hotel has several shopping and dining locations, including the following:

- Everything POP Shopping and Dining is both the food court and the gift shop for the resort. The gift shop has products based on the 1950s–1990s as well as Disney merchandise. The food court has different specialty shops; Mom's Kitchen, Grill Shop, Pizza Shop, and the Sandwiches, Soups and Salads Shop. This is the only resort in Walt Disney World that serves 'Tie Dyed' cheesecake, a Pop Century favorite. The Disney Dining Plan can be used to purchase Quick Service meals.
- Grab-N-Go Market is located in the back of Everything Pop and offers foods that can be carried into the theme parks, such as water, muffins, and sandwiches.
- Petals Pool Bar is a bar located near the Hippy-Dippy Pool in the 1960s themed area, near the "Classic Hall" lobby. Alcoholic beverages such as beer, sangria and cocktails may be purchased at the bar.

== Gallery ==
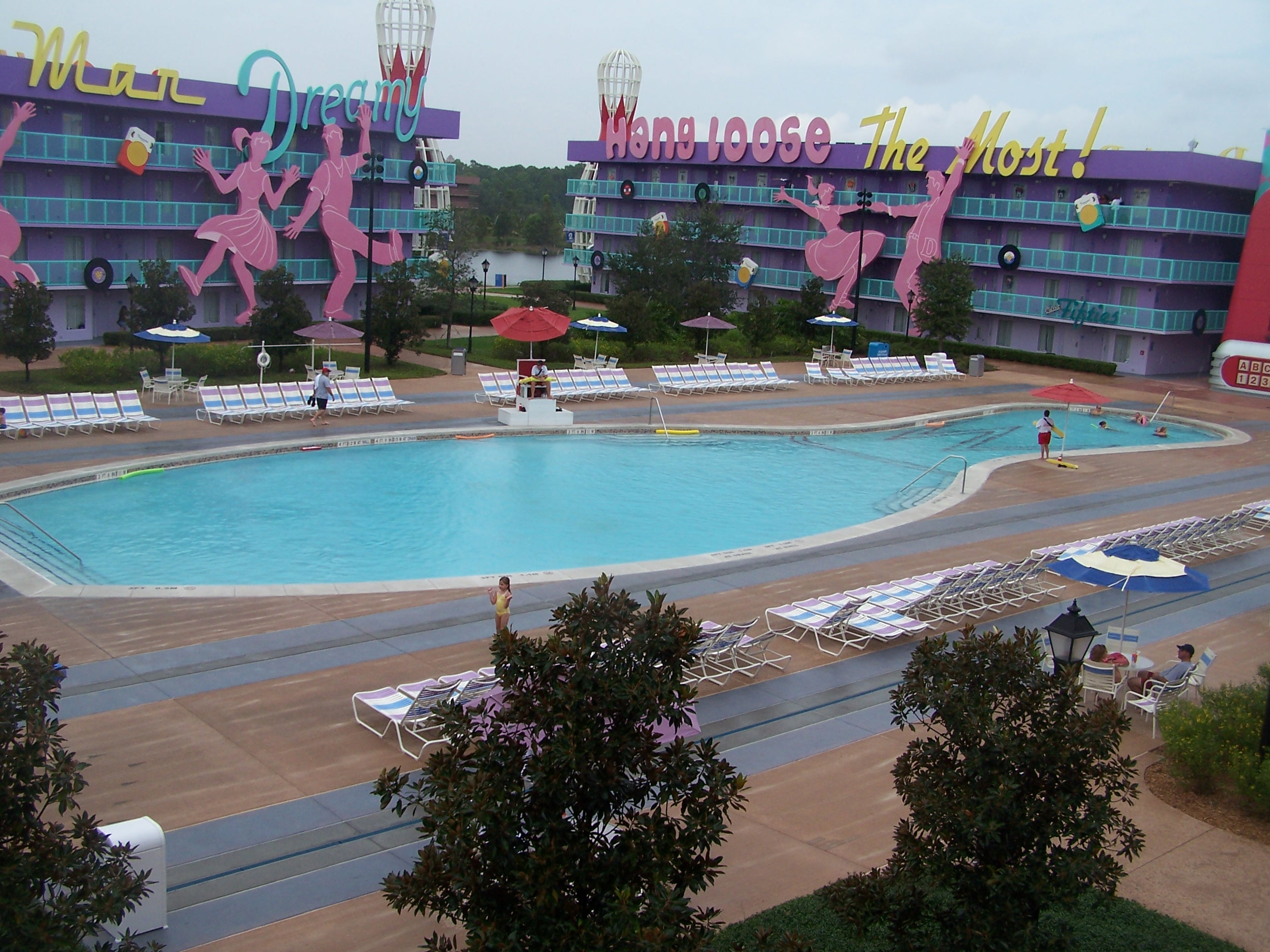
1950s rooms overlooking the Bowling pin shaped pool.

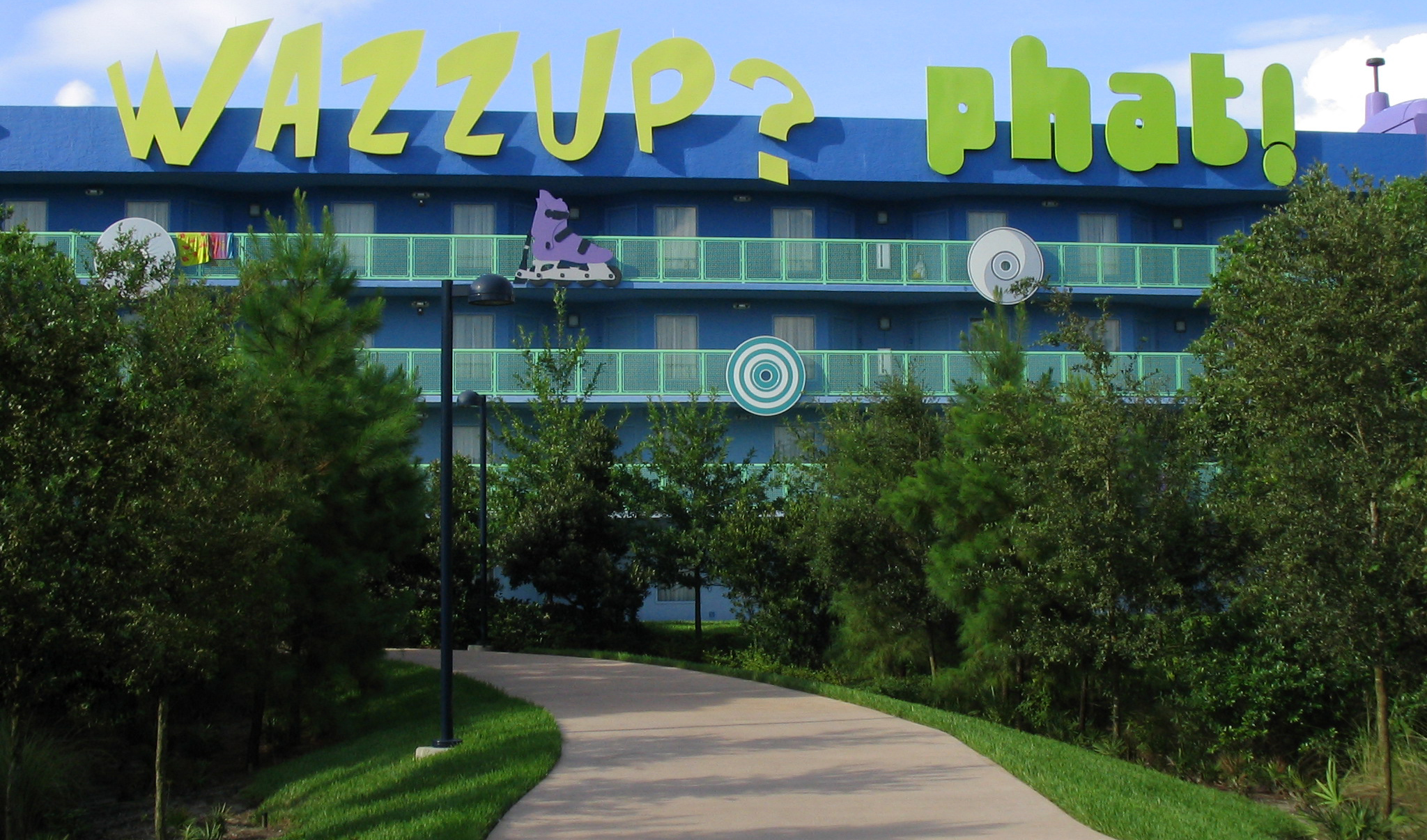
1990s rooms.

Entrance to Everything Pop.

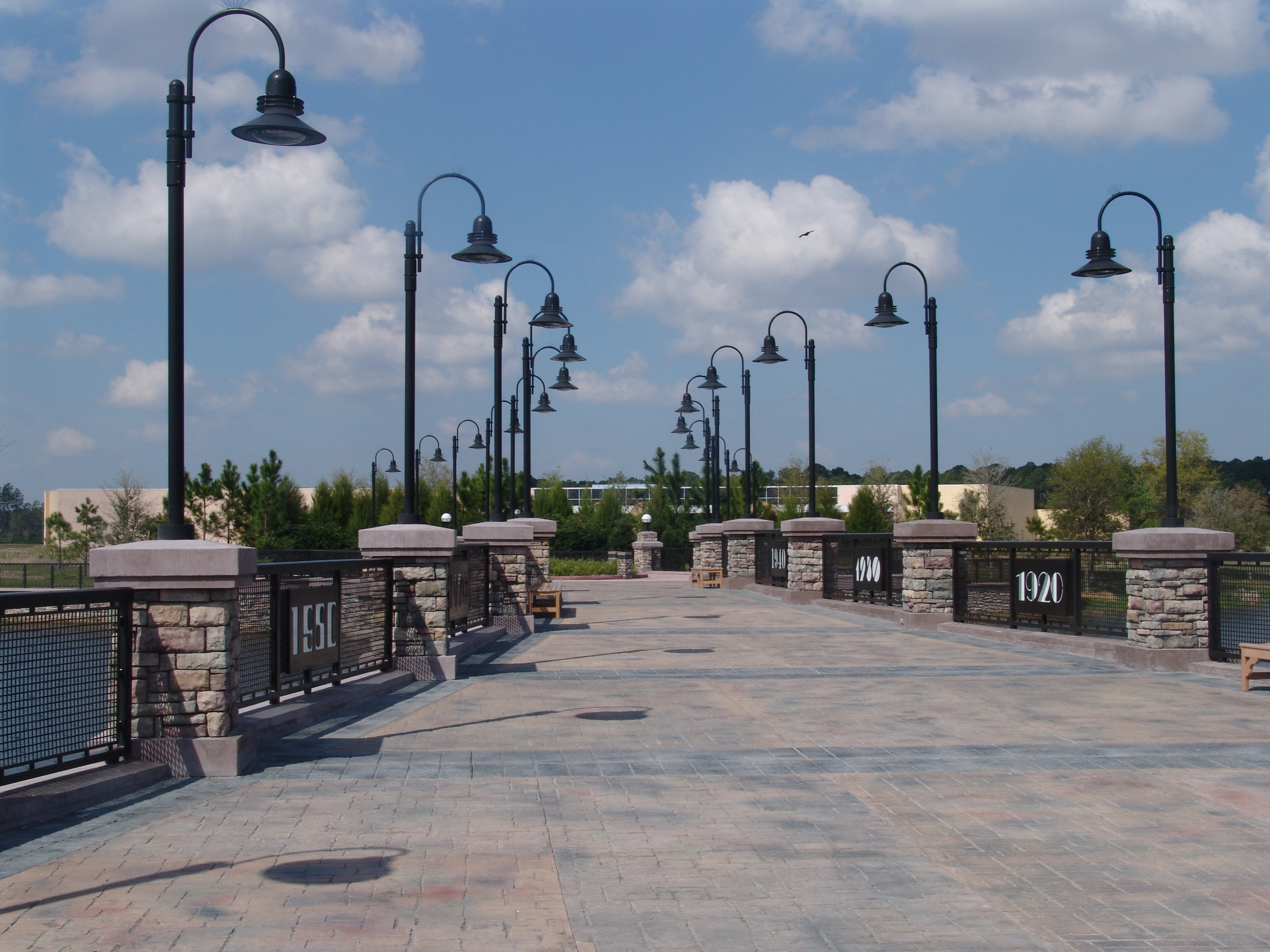
Generation Gap bridge, prior to Disney's Art of Animation Resort and Disney Skyliner, taken in 2004.
