= Disney's Art of Animation Resort =

Hotel at Walt Disney World

Coordinates: 28°21′0.98″N 81°32′54.59″W

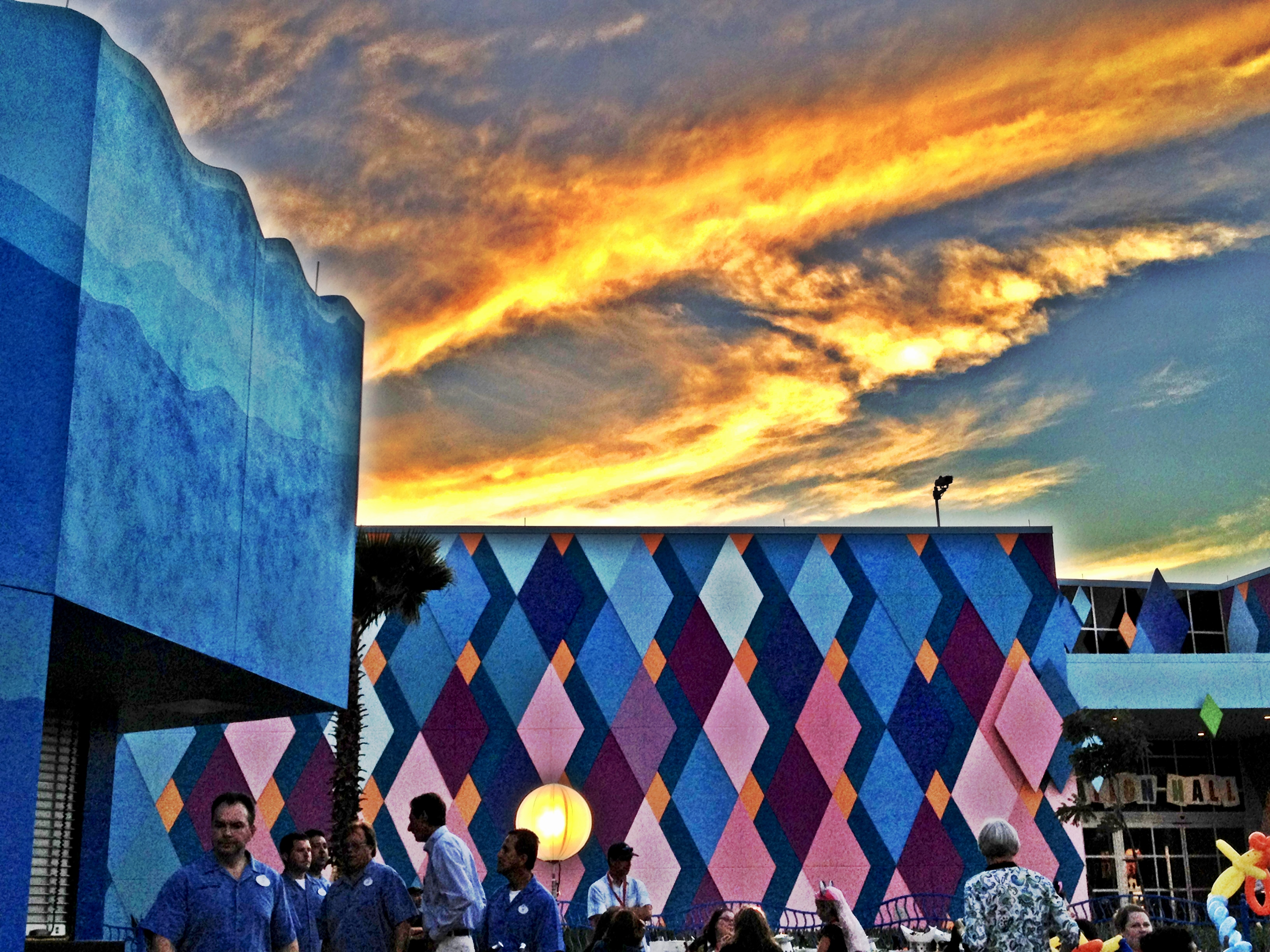
- Animation Hall, the main building at Disney's Art of Animation Resort

General information
- Type: Resort
- Location: Wide World of Sports Resort Area
- Opened: May 31, 2012
- Operator: Disney Experiences

Other information
- Number of rooms: 984
- Number of suites: 1,120

Website
- Official website

Disney's Art of Animation Resort is a resort within Walt Disney World Resort in Bay Lake, Florida. It is located where construction on the unfinished half of Disney's Pop Century Resort was started but later abandoned after the September 11 attacks. It is considered a value resort.

The resort was the first to be built in the complex in over seven years and the fifth in the value-priced category, along with the three All-Star Resorts and the Pop Century Resort. Family suites opened on May 31, 2012, and standard rooms opened on September 15, 2012.

== Overview ==
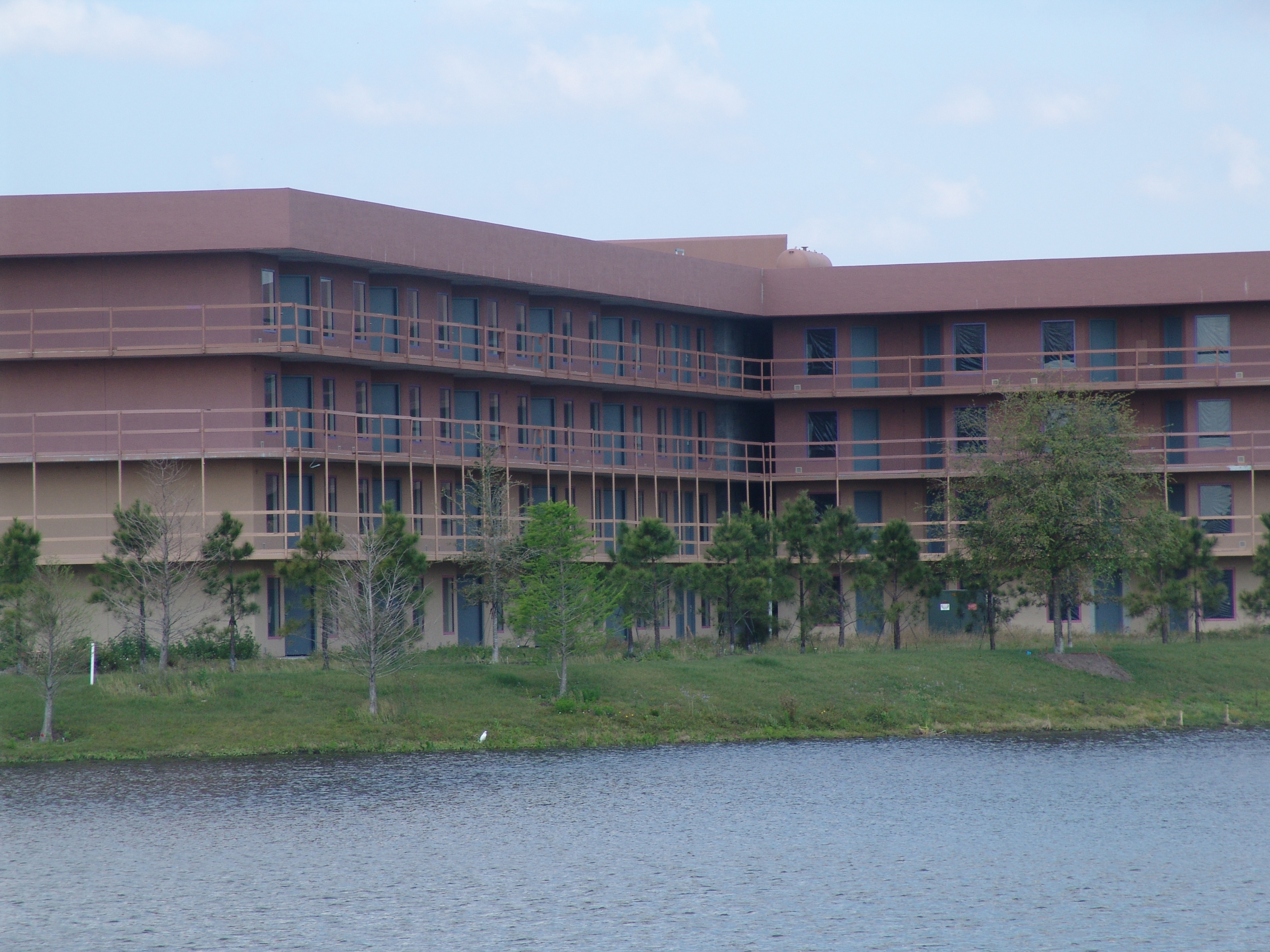
Unfinished building in 2004

The land the Art of Animation Resort occupies was formerly home to the Epcot Center Ultralight Flightpark and was planned to be the second phase of Disney's Pop Century Resort. As originally designed, the resort would have two sections, the "Legendary Years" section with theming from the decades 1900 through 1940 and the "Classic Years" section with theming from the decades 1950 through 1990. In the middle of the two sections would be Hourglass Lake, with a connection across the narrow, center part of the lake called the Generation Gap Bridge. Each section would have one main hall building and ten guest room buildings, with 2,880 rooms, giving the resort a grand total of 5,760 rooms.

Construction on both phases started in 1999, and by 2002, construction had been started on the second phase, the "Legendary Years," with three buildings (the main hall, along with guest room buildings 7 and 8) at least partially completed. However, tourism suffered after the September 11 attacks, and Disney decided to halt further construction of the second phase. The first phase, the "Classic Years" section, was completed and opened in 2003. At that time, Disney said that they would defer the completion of the second phase until 2007. However, the three buildings stood abandoned for nearly a decade.

Disney experimented in October 2005 with converting some of the rooms at the All-Star Music Resort into two-room suites, giving families a lower-cost option to stay in the same room. Reports at the time indicated that if the test was successful, Disney would develop the second phase of Pop Century as an all-suite resort.

In January 2010, Disney began preparing the site, and in May 2010, it announced that it would be developed as the Art of Animation resort. The plans called for seven buildings to be developed with a focus on family suites, reached by hotel-style interior hallways. However, the two buildings that were already built as motel-style individual rooms would remain and be joined by a third building in the same style, creating The Little Mermaid area. Construction began in the summer of 2010. The Art of Animation began its phased opening on May 31, 2012, and continued through September 15, 2012.

A station for the Disney Skyliner, a gondola lift system, was built on the Generation Gap Bridge between the Art of Animation and Pop Century resorts and opened on September 29, 2019. The Skyliner offers hotel guests access to the Epcot and Hollywood Studios theme parks and the BoardWalk shopping district via the Caribbean Beach Resort.

In May 2026, it was announced that The Little Mermaid rooms will undergo an extensive overhaul, set to open in the summer of 2027.

== Theming ==
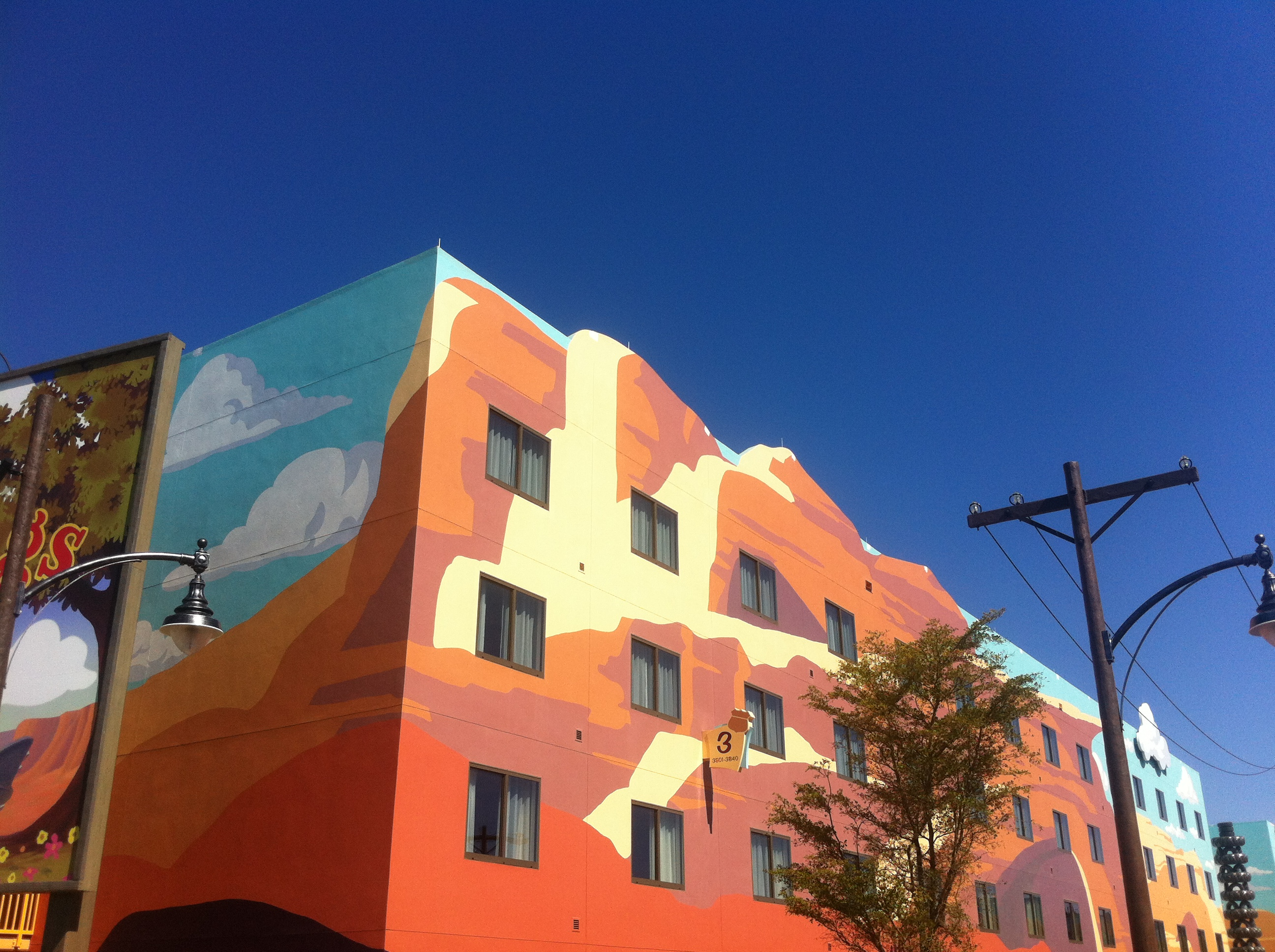
Cars themed hotel building

The resort is designed "with families in mind." It features four of Disney's popular character themes: Cars, Finding Nemo, The Lion King, and The Little Mermaid. Much like the other Disney Value Resorts, giant versions of various items are built around the hotel on each of the ten wings, such as a 35-foot (11 m) model of King Triton. In total, there are 1,984 rooms, of which 1,120 are family suites capable of housing up to six people, featuring living rooms and bedrooms. The remaining 864 sport the standard value layout. The resort has a total of ten buildings, as well as three themed pools. "The Big Blue Pool", with an area of 11,859 square feet (1,101.7 m^{2}), is currently the largest swimming pool at Walt Disney World Resort.

- Finding Nemo: This is the first area of the resort, which opened on May 31, 2012. It is themed with the ocean setting featured in the film, with underwater plant and animal decorations throughout the buildings.
- Cars: The second section of the resort, which opened on June 18, 2012. It is themed like the Cozy Cone Motel featured in the film. Resort buildings are themed with the movie's characters.
- The Lion King: The third section of the resort, which opened on August 10, 2012. It is themed with a "natural" setting, similar to that found in the savannah.
- The Little Mermaid: The fourth and final section of the resort, which opened on September 15, 2012. Themed with 600 cutout objects on resort balconies. This section of the resort has exterior walkways, where the other sections have enclosed interior walkways between the rooms.

== Dining and shopping ==
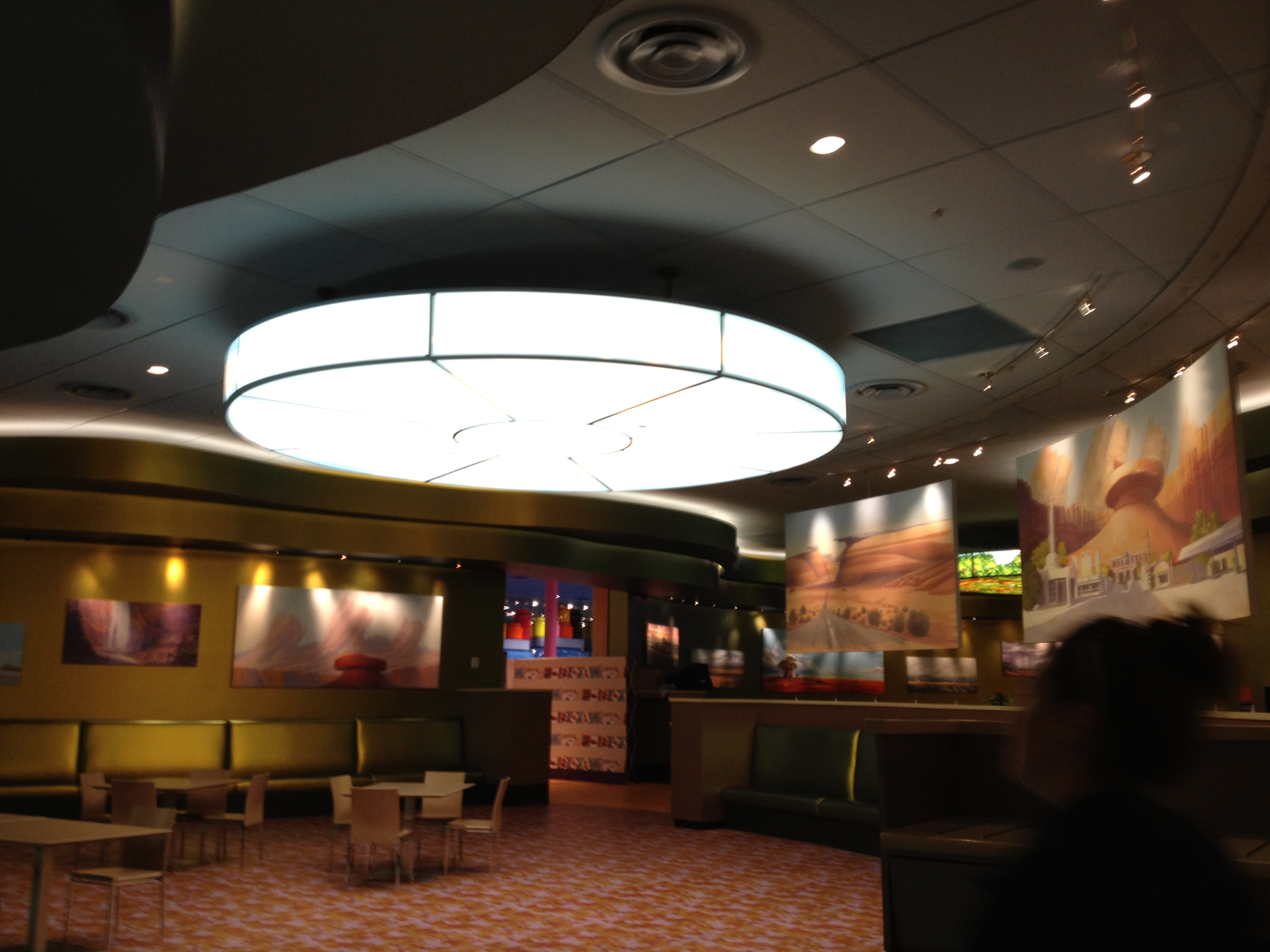
Inside Landscape of Flavors food court

- Landscape of Flavors: A food court selling American cuisine and deli-style market items. It is open for breakfast, lunch, and dinner and seats 606 people.
- The Drop Off Pool Bar: A quick serve kiosk serving alcoholic drinks and snacks. Open mid-day to late evening.
- Pizza Delivery: Pizza, sandwiches, salad, dessert, and beverages are available in the evening for delivery to guest rooms.
- Ink & Paint Shop: A gift shop that offers a range of items, from souvenirs to Art of Animation-themed clothing. The store also has a grocery section that sells snacks, liquor, drinks, and sundries.

== Gallery ==
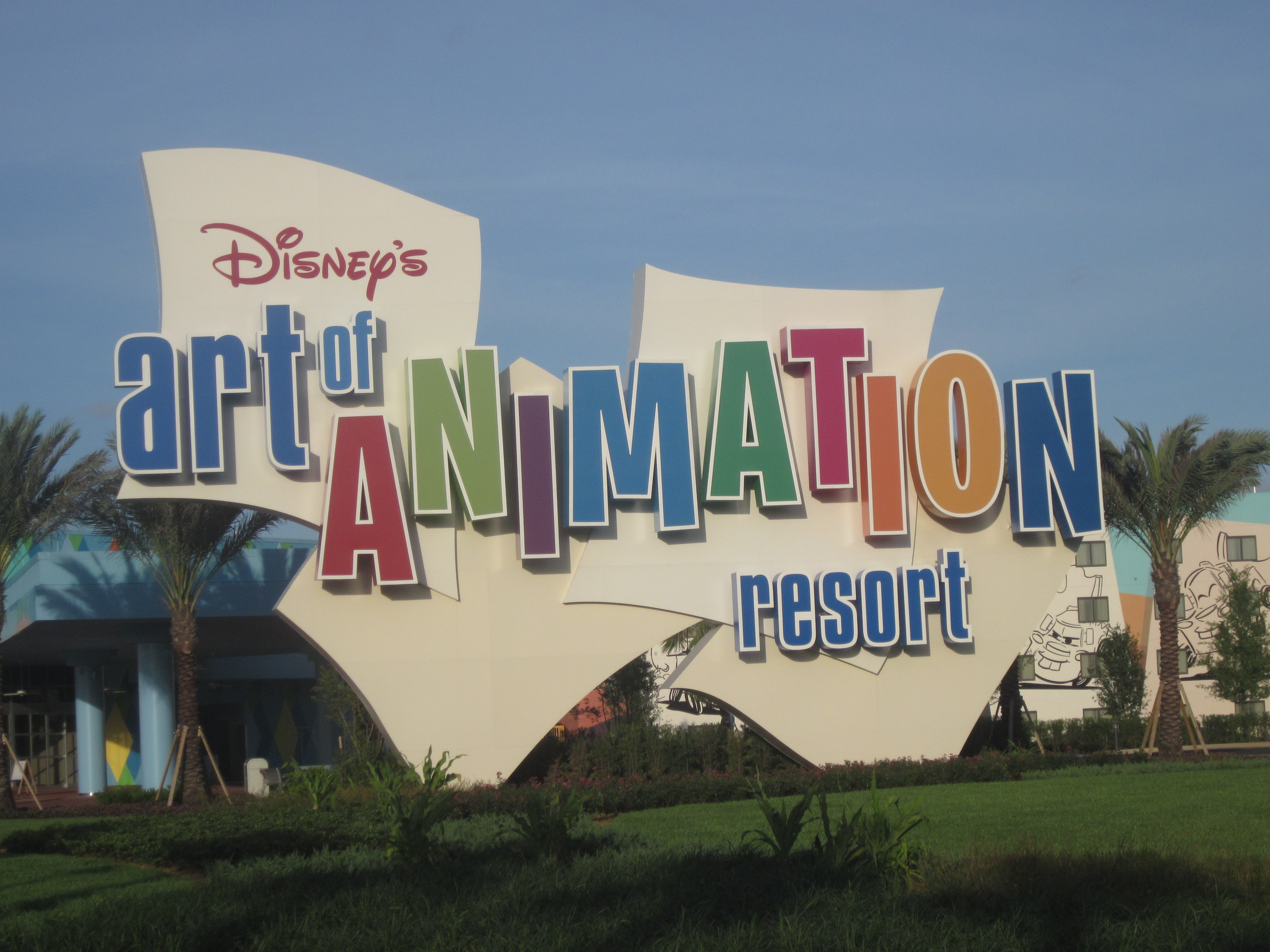
Exterior of Animation Hall, central hall of the resort

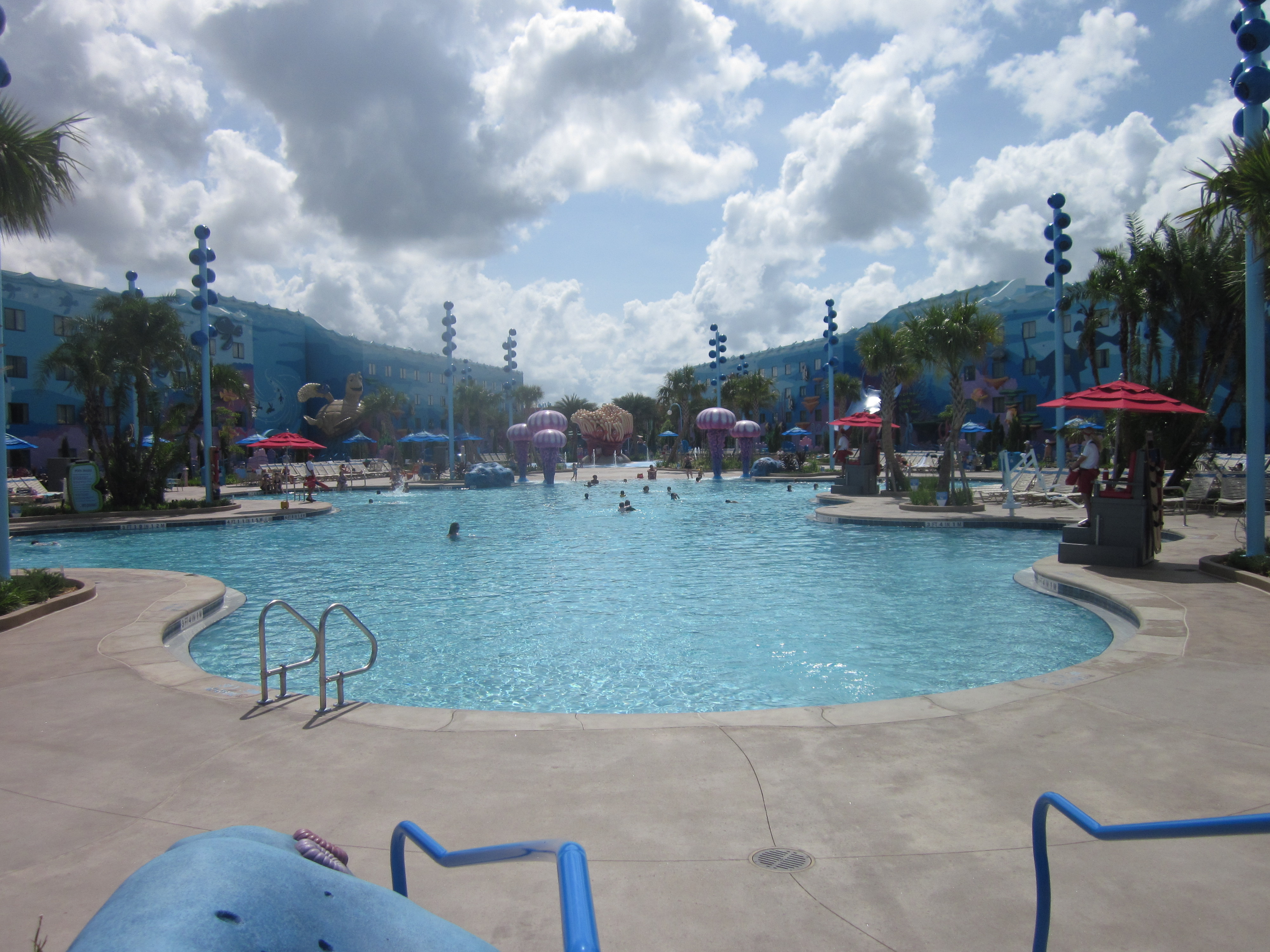
Swimming pool in the Finding Nemo section, the largest pool at a hotel in Disney World

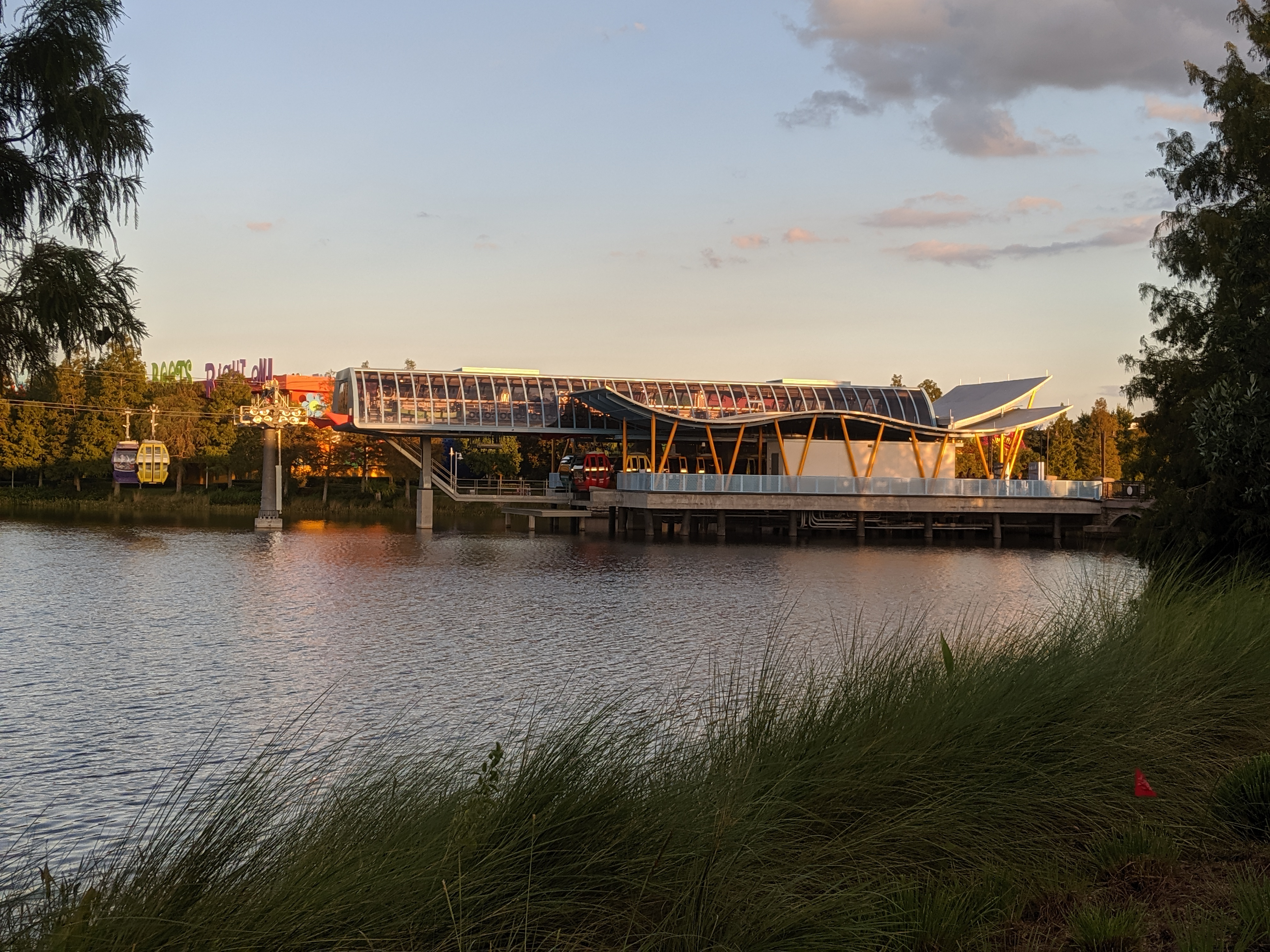
Skyliner station in the middle of Hourglass Lake as seen from resort

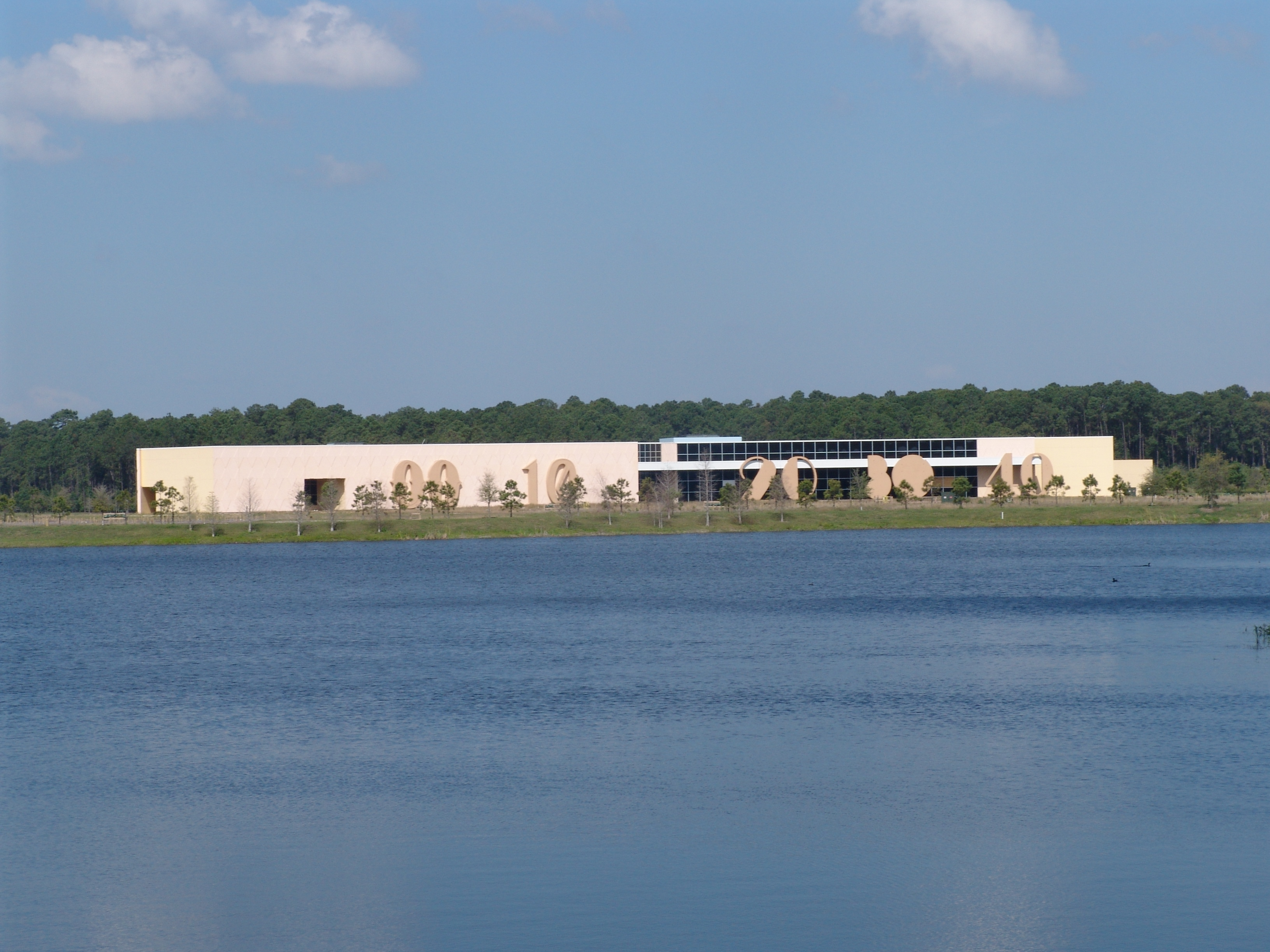
Unfinished "Legendary Hall" in 2004, later renamed Animation Hall

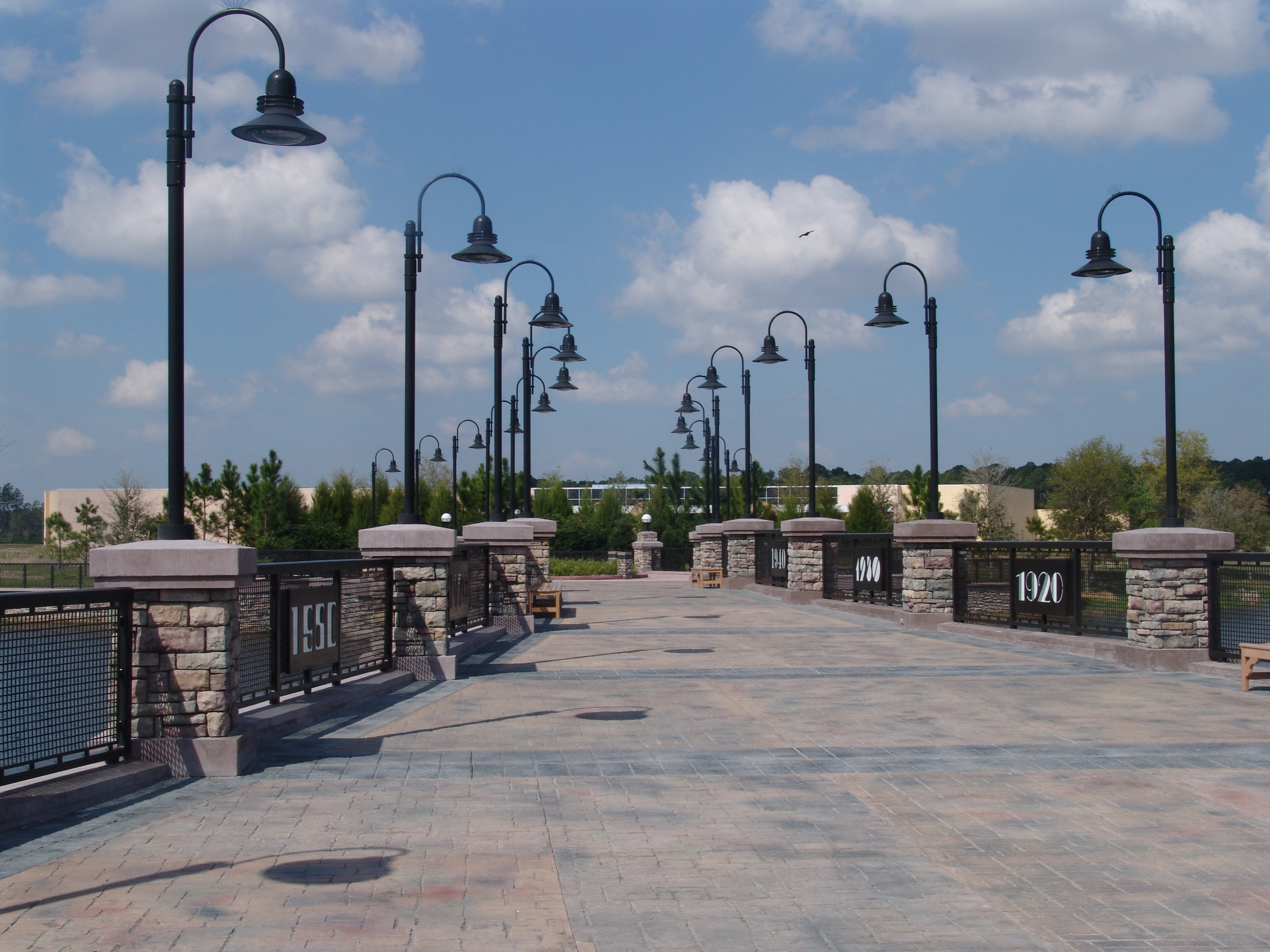
Generation Gap bridge showing Legendary Years theming, 2004

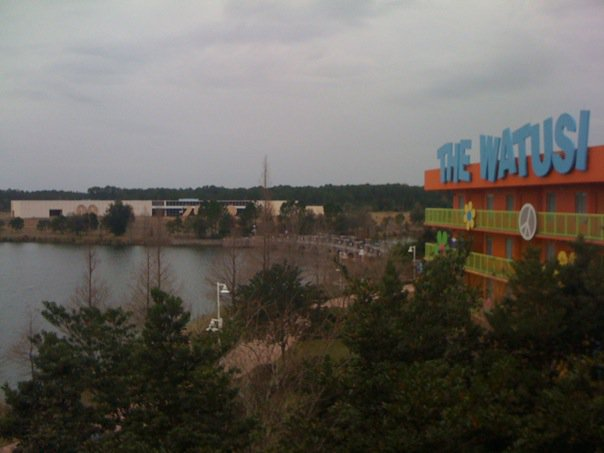
An incomplete building seen from across Hourglass Lake, 2010

== Incidents ==
- On July 14, 2015, a three-year-old boy was found at the bottom of a resort pool after becoming separated from his parents. Officials with the Orange County Sheriff's Office reported the child was later pronounced dead at an area hospital.
